= Sean Reycraft =

Canadian playwright and screenwriter

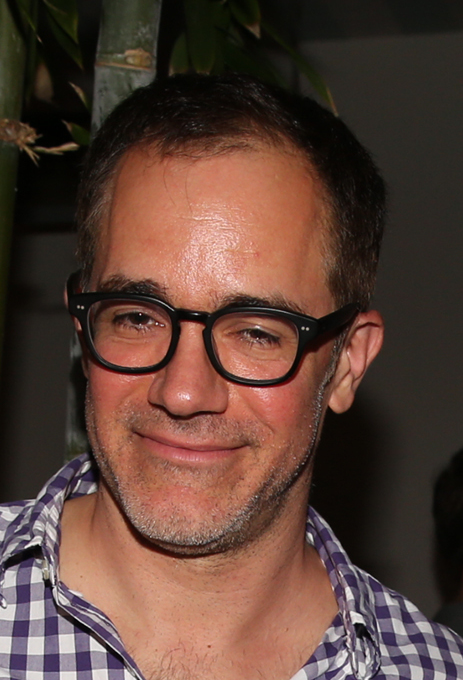
- Reycraft in 2015.
- Occupations: television producer and playwright

Sean Reycraft is a Canadian screenwriter, television producer and playwright. He is most noted for his theatrical play Pop Song, which won the Floyd S. Chalmers Canadian Play Award in the Youth Theatre division in 2001, and as the screenwriter of Laurie Lynd's 2007 film Breakfast with Scot.

The son of former Ontario MPP Doug Reycraft, he was born and raised in Glencoe. He was an actor in the early 1990s before premiering his first play, Einstein Dreams at Buddies in Bad Times in 1996. His later plays included Reconstruction, The End of Dancing, Roundabout, Strange Things Happen, and One Good Marriage.

He studied film and television writing at the Canadian Film Centre, and has since been a writer and producer on television series such as Braceface, The Eleventh Hour, Degrassi: The Next Generation, Instant Star, Slings & Arrows, The Best Years, 90210, Being Erica, The Vampire Diaries, Switched at Birth, Finding Carter and Killjoys.

He is out as gay.
