= RSVP (1991 film) =

- Directed by: Laurie Lynd
- Written by: Laurie Lynd
- Starring: Daniel MacIvor
- Release date: 1991 (TIFF)
- Running time: 23 minutes
- Country: Canada
- Language: English

RSVP is a Canadian short film, directed by Laurie Lynd and released in 1991. It was one of the films singled out by film critic B. Ruby Rich in her influential 1992 essay on the emergence of New Queer Cinema.

== Plot ==
The film, mostly musical with very little spoken dialogue, stars Daniel MacIvor as Sid, a man returning home for the first time since his partner Andrew's death of AIDS. He turns on CBC Stereo's classical music program RSVP just as the announcer is reading a request, submitted by Andrew himself shortly before his death, to play Jessye Norman's recording of "Le Spectre de la rose" from Hector Berlioz's Les nuits d'été. As the music begins, Sid reminisces about the relationship; after it ends, he calls Andrew's sister in Winnipeg to advise her to listen to the program when it airs in her time zone. His sister, in turn, notifies other family members and each relives their own memories of Andrew as they listen to the song, creating an extended community of people united in their grief as the shared experience of the music metaphorically collapses their geographic distance from each other.

== Cast ==
- Stewart Arnott as Sid's Friend (voice)
- Ferne Downey as Andrew's sister
- Gordon Jocelyn as Andrew's father
- London Juno as (unnamed)
- Daniel MacIvor as Sid
- Ross Manson as Andrew
- Judith Orban as Andrew's mother

== Reception ==
The film premiered at the 1991 Toronto International Film Festival. Lynd sent the completed film to Jessye Norman in advance of its theatrical premiere, seeking her approval. Norman was so moved by it that she flew to Toronto to attend the screening, at which she held Lynd's hand throughout the entire film.

It aired on television later in 1991 as a special, and garnered two Gemini Award nominations, for Short Dramatic Program and Direction in a Dramatic Program or Mini-Series, at the 6th Gemini Awards in 1992. The film was subsequently re-broadcast on CBC Television's Canadian Reflections in 1993.

In 2007, Toronto's Inside Out Film and Video Festival screened both RSVP and Lynd's subsequent film The Fairy Who Didn't Want to Be a Fairy Anymore, along with an excerpt from his highly anticipated but not yet completed feature film Breakfast with Scot.
