= Michael Downing (writer) =

American novelist (1958–2021)

- Born: May 8, 1958; Pittsfield, Massachusetts, U.S.
- Died: February 9, 2021 (aged 62)
- Education: Harvard University
- Occupations: Writer and academic
- Spouse: Peter Bryant (m. 2013)
- Writing career
- Notable works: Breakfast with Scot; The Chapel; Spring Forward: The Annual Madness of Daylight Saving Time

Michael Downing (May 8, 1958 – February 9, 2021) was an American writer and academic. A longtime professor of creative writing at Tufts University, he was most noted for his 1999 novel Breakfast with Scot, which was a Stonewall Book Award nominee in 2001 and was adapted by Canadian film director Laurie Lynd into the 2007 film Breakfast with Scot.

== Career ==
A native of Pittsfield, Massachusetts, and a graduate of Harvard University, Downing wrote for various magazines before publishing his debut novel A Narrow Time in 1987. He followed up with Mother of God in 1990, and Perfect Agreement in 1997.

He joined Tufts University in 1998, after several years teaching at Wheelock College.

His later books included the novels The Chapel (2015) and Still in Love (2019), the non-fiction books Shoes Outside the Door: Desire, Devotion, and Excess at San Francisco Zen Center (2001) and Spring Forward: The Annual Madness of Daylight Saving Time (2005), and the personal memoir Life with Sudden Death: A Tale of Moral Hazard and Medical Misadventure (2009). The memoir addressed his experiences learning that he suffered from the same genetic heart defect that had caused the sudden deaths of his father and older brother, and his decision to mitigate the risk by having surgery to receive an implantable cardioverter-defibrillator.

== Personal life ==
Downing met his partner Peter Bryant in 1982. The couple legally married in 2013.
