= New queer cinema =

Movement in queer-themed independent filmmaking

"New queer cinema" (sometimes referred to as the "queer new wave") is a term coined by the UC Santa Cruz academic B. Ruby Rich in Sight & Sound magazine in 1992 to define and describe a movement in queer-themed independent filmmaking in the early 1990s.

== Definition ==
The term developed from use of the word queer in academic writing in the 1980s and 1990s as an inclusive way of describing gay, lesbian, bisexual and transgender identity and experience, and also defining a form of sexuality that was fluid and subversive of traditional understandings of sexuality. The major film studio to discuss these issues was aptly named New Line Cinema with its Fine Line Features division. Since 1992, the phenomenon has also been described by various other academics and has been used to describe several other films released since the 1990s. Films of the new queer cinema movement typically share certain themes, such as the rejection of heteronormativity and the lives of LGBTQ protagonists living on the fringe of society.

== History ==
=== Queer cinema ===
Susan Hayward states that queer cinema existed for decades before it was given its official label, such as the films of French creators Jean Cocteau (Le sang d'un poète in 1934) and Jean Genet (Un chant d'amour in 1950). Queer cinema is associated with avant-garde and underground films (e.g., Andy Warhol's 1960s films). In avant-garde film, there are lesbian filmmakers, who laid the heritage for queer cinema, notably Ulrike Ottinger, Chantal Akerman and Pratibha Parmar.

An important influence on the development of queer cinema was Rainer Werner Fassbinder's 1970s and 1980s European art films, which added a "gay and queer sensibility" to film (e.g., Querelle from 1982, based on Genet's novel). Rosa von Praunheim made more than 100 films on queer topics since the late 1960s, many of them have been shown and rated internationally; some of the director's films are considered milestones in queer cinema. Von Praunheim became an international icon of queer cinema. Another influence on queer cinema was the Brazilian filmmaker Héctor Babenco, whose film Kiss of the Spider Woman, from 1985, depicted a man in prison, who is seduced by his cellmate. His films also examined the relationship between sexual, social, and political oppression, which would go on to become key themes of new queer cinema.

The identification of queer cinema probably emerged in the mid-1980s through the influence of queer theory, which aims to "challenge and push further debates on gender and sexuality" as developed by feminist theory and "confuse binary essentialisms around gender and sexual identity, expose their limitations", and depict the blurring of these roles and identities. Queer cinema filmmakers sometimes made films in genres that were typically considered mainstream, then subverting conventions by depicting the "question of pleasure" and celebrating excess, or by re-adding homosexual themes or historical elements where they had been erased through straightwashing (e.g. in Derek Jarman's 1991 historical film Edward II).

Queer cinema filmmakers called for a "multiplicity of voices and sexualities" and equally had a "collection of different aesthetics" in their work. The issue of "lesbian invisibility" had been raised in queer cinema, since more funding went to gay male filmmakers than lesbian directors, as is the case with the heterosexual/mainstream film industry, and as such, much of queer cinema focused on the "construction of male desire".

=== Rich's articles ===
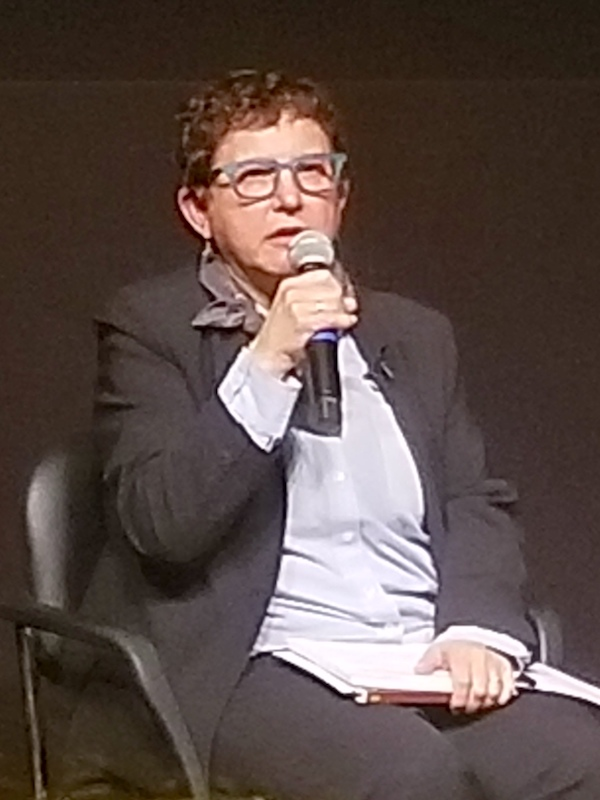
Film critic B. Ruby Rich coined the term "new queer cinema" in 1992.

In her 1992 article, Rich commented on the strong gay and lesbian presence on the previous year's film festival circuit and coined the phrase "new queer cinema" to describe a growing movement of similarly themed films being made by gay and lesbian independent filmmakers, chiefly in North America and the United Kingdom. Rich developed her theory in The Village Voice and Sight & Sound, describing films that were radical in form and aggressive in their presentation of sexual identities, which challenged both the status quo of heterosexual definition and resisted promoting "positive" images of lesbians and gay men that had been advocated by the gay liberation movement of the 1970s and 1980s. In the films of new queer cinema, the protagonists and narratives were predominantly LGBTQ, but were presented invariably as outsiders and renegades from the rules of conventional society, who embraced radical and unconventional gender roles and ways of life, frequently casting themselves as outlaws or fugitives.

Drawing on postmodernist and poststructuralist academic theories of the 1980s, the new queer cinema presented human identity and sexuality as socially constructed, and therefore fluid and changeable, rather than fixed. In the world of New Queer Cinema, sexuality is often a chaotic and subversive force, which is alienating to and often brutally repressed by dominant heterosexual power structures. Films in the new queer cinema movement frequently featured explicit and unapologetic depictions of same-sex sexual activity, and presented same-sex relationships that reconfigured traditional heterosexual notions of family and marriage. While not all identifying with a specific political movement, new queer cinema films were invariably radical, as they sought to challenge and subvert assumptions about identity, gender, class, family and society.

=== Generic developments ===
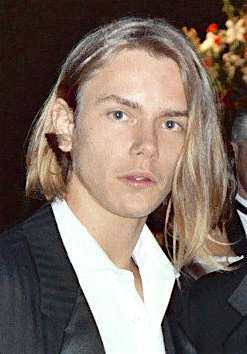
River Phoenix's critically acclaimed performance as gay hustler Mikey Waters in Gus Van Sant's 1991 film My Own Private Idaho helped bring queer cinema to a broader audience.

The 1990 documentary Paris Is Burning introduced audiences to yet another subcultural realm. Director Jennie Livingston captured the realities of New York's drag balls and houses, and of the people of color who occupied these spaces. This was an arguably underground world with which many Americans were unfamiliar. Aesthetic excellence and flamboyance were crucial in drag performances and competitions. Stylized vogue dancing was also exhibited as central to the drag experience, notably influencing the artistry of pop icon Madonna. New queer cinema figures like Livingston encouraged viewers to suspend their ignorance, and enjoy the diversity of humanity.

Not only did these films frequently reference the AIDS crisis of the 1980s, the film movement itself can be seen as a response to the crisis. The tone and energy of these movies reflected the assertive outrage of AIDS activist organizations of the past decade. AIDS activist videos, in particular, had a strong influence on the themes and imagery in new queer cinema as many of its notable figures were directly involved with AIDS activism. These films commented on the failure of the Ronald Reagan administration to respond to the AIDS epidemic and the social stigma experienced by the gay community. Given the relative invisibility of references to AIDS in mainstream Hollywood film-making, the work of new queer cinema was hailed by the gay community as a welcome correction to a history of under-representation and stereotyping of gay and lesbian people.

Among the films cited by Rich were Todd Haynes's Poison (1991), Laurie Lynd's RSVP (1991), Isaac Julien's Young Soul Rebels (1991), Derek Jarman's Edward II (1991), Tom Kalin's Swoon (1992), and Gregg Araki's The Living End (1992). All the films feature explicitly gay and lesbian protagonists and subjects; explicit and unapologetic depictions of or references to gay sex; and a confrontational and often antagonistic approach towards heterosexual culture.

These directors were making their films at a time when the gay community was facing new challenges from the AIDS crisis in the 1980s and the conservative political wave brought on by the presidency of Ronald Reagan in the United States and the government of Margaret Thatcher in the United Kingdom. Jarman was diagnosed with AIDS in 1986, and died in 1994 at the age of 52. Jarman's public promotion of gay rights and equality have established him as an influential activist within the LGBTQ community. Queer theory and politics were emerging topics in academic circles, with proponents arguing that gender and sexual categories, such as homosexual and heterosexual, were historical social constructs, subject to change with cultural attitudes. Rich noted that many films were beginning to represent sexualities that were unashamedly neither fixed nor conventional, and coined the phrase "new queer cinema".

Other important examples of new queer cinema include the first feature film by a black lesbian, Cheryl Dunye's The Watermelon Woman (1996), and Hong Kong director Wong Kar-wai's Happy Together (1997). Go Fish (1994), directed by Rose Troche and co-written by Guinevere Turner, was acclaimed for its authentic and nuanced portrayal of lesbian relationships. The film premiered at the Sundance Film Festival, where it became the first title in the 1994 lineup to be acquired by a distributor. In 2024, Go Fish was digitally restored to commemorate its 30th anniversary.

== In the 21st century ==
Beginning in the 2010s, a number of LGBT filmmakers, including Rose Troche and Travis Mathews, identified a newer trend in LGBT filmmaking, in which the influence of new queer cinema was evolving toward more universal audience appeal.

Rich, the originator of the phrase "new queer cinema", has identified the emergence in the late 2000s of LGBT-themed mainstream films such as Brokeback Mountain, Milk, and The Kids Are All Right as a key moment in the evolution of the genre. Both Troche and Mathews singled out Stacie Passon's 2013 Concussion, a film about marital infidelity in which the central characters' lesbianism is a relatively minor aspect of a story and the primary theme is how a long-term relationship can become troubled and unfulfilling regardless of its gender configuration, as a prominent example of the trend. The French film Blue Is the Warmest Colour, which won the Palme d'Or at the 2013 Cannes Film Festival, has also been singled out as a notable example. Released in 2018, Love, Simon was the first major studio film to center a gay teenage romance. More recently, Academy Award for Best Picture winners Moonlight and Everything Everywhere All at Once have been notable for prominently depicting queer characters.

== See also ==
- List of lesbian, gay, bisexual or transgender-related films
- History of homosexuality in American film
- New York Lesbian, Gay, Bisexual, & Transgender Film Festival
- New Maricón Cinema

== Sources ==
- B. Ruby Rich. "New Queer Cinema": Sight & Sound, Volume 2, Issue 5 (September 1992)
- B. Ruby Rich. "Queer and present danger": Sight & Sound, Volume 10, Issue 3 (March 2000)
- B. Ruby Rich, New Queer Cinema: The Director's Cut, Duke University Press, 2013.
- Pier Maria Bocchi, Mondo Queer. Cinema e militanza gay, Lindau, Torino, 2005, ISBN 88-71-80-548-8.
- Joseph Bristow: Sexuality (1997), ISBN 0-415-08494-6
- Cante, Richard C. (March 2009). Gay Men and the Forms of Contemporary US Culture. London: Ashgate Publishing. ISBN 978-0-7546-7230-2.
- Derek Jarman: Queer Edward II (1991), ISBN 0-85170-316-X
- Martin Frey. Derek Jarman - Bewegte Bilder eines Malers. BoD, 2008, ISBN 978-3-8370-1217-0
- Nick Rees-Roberts: French Queer Cinema, Edinburgh University Press, 2008
- Mark Simpson (ed.): Anti-Gay (1996), ISBN 0-304-33144-9
- Tamsin Spargo: Foucault and Queer theory (1999), ISBN 1-84046-092-X
- Colin Spencer: Homosexuality: A History (1995) ISBN 1-85702-447-8
- Pamela Demory, Christopher Pullen (ed.), Queer Love in Film and Television: Critical Essays, Palgrave Macmillan, 2013.
- Robin Griffiths, Queer Cinema in Europe, Intellect Books, 2008.
- Richard Dyer: The Culture of Queers (2002). ISBN 0-415-22376-8
- Axel Schock / Manuela Kay: Out im Kino. Das lesbisch-schwule Filmlexikon (2004). ISBN 978-3-89656-090-2
- Doan, Laura L. The Lesbian Postmodern. New York: Columbia University Press, 1994.
- Aaron, Michele. New Queer Cinema: A Critical Reader. New Jersey: Rutgers University Press, 2004.
