= Hans Meyer (actor) =

South African actor (1925–2020)

- Born: July 21, 1925; Paulpietersburg, Natal, Union of South Africa (present-day KwaZulu-Natal, South Africa)
- Died: April 3, 2020 (aged 94); Neuilly-sur-Seine, Île-de-France, France
- Occupations: Actor, model
- Years active: 1961–2014
- Website: www.hansmeyer.info

Hans Meyer (21 July 1925 – 3 April 2020) was a South African-French actor and model. He was well-known for his role as Hauptmann Franz Ulmann on the British television series Colditz.

== Early life and education ==
Meyer was born to German parents in Paulpietersburg, Natal Province, South Africa in July 1925. Both of his parents were farmers, and Meyer initially followed in their footsteps, before deciding to move to Europe and pursue his own fortune.

He worked initially as a model where he posed for book covers until a friend in Germany working for an advertising agency lined up his first work as an actor, a television advert for Puschkin Vodka. The brand became Germany's best-selling vodka and Meyer became known as "Frank S. Thorn, the Puschkin Man". He also inspired the appearance of British comic strip hero Jeff Hawke.

== Career ==
Meyer was hired by Anatole Litvak as an extra for his film The Night of the Generals (1967). He went on the play supporting roles in French films alongside French cinema stars such as Lino Ventura, Alain Delon and Jean-Paul Belmondo. In 1966, he was engaged for La grande vadrouille, where he embodied an angry SS representative. In 1968 he played in the action thriller The Devil's Garden by Yves Boisset. In 1969, he took on the role of Sheriff Blade in the thriller Les Étrangers, shot in Spain.

In the 1970s, Meyer acted in the Western Cannon for Cordoba (1970), in the role of the Swedish major Svedborg, the leader of a private mercenary army. He played a continuous series role in the British television series Colditz (1972–1974). In 1975 he had a small role in Stanley Kubrick's film adaptation of Barry Lyndon. In 1978, he appeared in the miniseries Holocaust: The History of the Weiss Family, in which played the SS official Ernst Kaltenbrunner.

In the 1980s, Meyer's roles included an assassin, whom Yves Rénier and title heroine Claude Jade ultimately put to the test in the television movie The Girlfriend from Childhood (L'amie d'enfance, 1981), from the Commissaire Moulin series. Meyer portrayed Red Sonja's father in Red Sonja (1985) opposite Brigitte Nielsen.

In the 1990s, he appeared on The Case-Book of Sherlock Holmes as Hebworth/Veitch in "The Master Blackmailer" (1992), and in a small part as a German Officer in Steven Spielberg's and George Lucas's The Young Indiana Jones Chronicles (1992).

In the 2000s, Meyer's roles included Marquis d'Apcher in the French cult movie Brotherhood of the Wolf (2001), Konrad Adenauer in the television movie How Much We Hated Each Other (2007), and Luis Aramchek in the Hitler in Hollywood (2010). His final screen appearance was in the thriller Cruel (2014).

== Death ==
Meyer died in Neuilly-sur-Seine, France on 3 April 2020 at the age of 94.

== Filmography ==
=== Film ===
- 1965: Pierrot le Fou - Gangster (uncredited)
- 1966: Culpable para un delito - Martín Baumer
- 1966: La Grande Vadrouille - Obergruppenführer S.S. Otto Weber
- 1966: Little Girls - Mike
- 1967: The Night of the Generals - Wehrmacht Adjutant (uncredited)
- 1967: The Last Adventure - Le mercenaire
- 1967: Salut les copines - Mike
- 1967: Réseau secret - Hermann Glöckel
- 1967: Un épais manteau de sang - Sorenson
- 1967: Le Crime de David Levinstein - Schrank
- 1968: Coplan Saves His Skin - Hugo
- 1969: Erotic Trap - Varen
- 1969: Les Étrangers - Blade
- 1970: Cannon for Cordoba - Svedborg
- 1970: Comme il est court le temps d'aimer - Marc
- 1970: Les enfants de Caïn
- 1971: Perched on a Tree - Colonel Muller
- 1971: Valparaiso, Valparaiso - Helmut
- 1972: Pic et pic et colegram - Jeroboam
- 1973: Le Magnifique - Colonel Collins
- 1975: Barry Lyndon - Prussian Officer
- 1976: Blondie - Inspector
- 1977: Le mille-pattes fait des claquettes - Général Von Richter
- 1979: La nuit claire - Pluton
- 1979: The Riddle of the Sands - Grimm
- 1979: La Gueule de l'autre - Richard Krauss
- 1980: Strangulation Blues (short)
- 1984: Boy Meets Girl - Le cosmonaute
- 1984: Tueur maison (Short)
- 1985: Ça n'arrive qu'à moi - Le responsible de la station Malabar
- 1985: Red Sonja - Red Sonja's Father
- 1986: The Night Is Young - Hans
- 1988: Ville étrangère - L'ambassadeur
- 1989: Céleri remoulade (Short)
- 1989: Roselyne and the Lions - Rainer
- 1989: La Révolution française - Le Duc de Brunswick
- 1989: Bunker Palace Hôtel - Le président
- 1989: L'Orchestre rouge - Nazi General
- 1992: John (Short) - John / Tarzan
- 1992: Une cuillerée pour papa (Short)
- 1993: Artcore oder Der Neger
- 1994: Le Terminus de Rita
- 1995: L'entretien (Short)
- 1997: Double Team - British Man
- 1997: K - Gûter
- 1997: Entre les vagues (Short)
- 2000: Le birdwatcher - Mitch Glassborough
- 2001: Le pacte des loups - Marquis d'Apcher
- 2002: Morteterre (Short) - Compt Klaus de Rexel
- 2003: The Dope - Rudolf Maier
- 2003: Baptiste (Short)
- 2003: Ripoux 3 - Van der Brook
- 2004: Albert est méchant - James Lord Cooke
- 2005: Sauf le respect que je vous dois - Lunel
- 2006: Final Sentence (Short) - The Inquisitor - The priest
- 2007: La piscine de maman (Short)
- 2010: Hitler à Hollywood - Luis Aramchek
- 2014: Cruel - Le libraire (final film role)

=== Television ===
Hans Meyer television credits
Year	Title	Role	Notes
1968	Koenigsmark	Le grand Duc	TV movie
1969	The Troubleshooters	Joachim Schmitt-Klever	1 episode
1969	S.O.S. fréquence 17	Joseph Kieffer	1 episode
1969	Department S	Lucky Le Beau	1 episode
1970	Codename	General Hovaths	1 episode
1971	Paul Temple	Brad	1 episode
1971	Kate	Frohl Svenson	1 episode
1971	Jason King	Angelo	1 episode
1972–74	Colditz	Hauptmann Franz Ulmann	23 episodes
1973	La folie Almayer	Le capitaine Linguard	TV movie
1974	Thriller	Karl Vorster	'The Next Scream You Hear', episode
1974	Heidi	Grandfather	TV miniseries
1975	Quiller	Major Hardtmann	1 episode
1976	Les Monte-en-l'air	Briefer	TV movie
1976	The Howerd Confessions	Lieutenant Gruber	epidode 2
1977	Fachoda, la mission Marchand	L'agent des trafiquants	TV miniseries
1978	Holocaust	Ernst Kaltenbrunner	TV miniseries
1978	Les grandes conjurations: Le connétable de Bourbon	Frunsberg	TV movie
1979	Quest of Eagles	Sandor	2 episodes
1979, 1985	Minder	Kurt Wengler / Maurice Bonnet	2 episodes
1980	Opération Trafics	Hans	1 episode
1981	BBC2 Playhouse	Janos Almasy	1 episode
1981	Commissaire Moulin	L'assassin au grenade	Episode: "L'Amie d'enfance"
1981	Sans famille	Driscoll	TV movie
1982	Les Amours des années grises	Von Postel	1 episode
1982	Inside the Third Reich	Ernst Kaltenbrunner	TV movie
1983	Les poneys sauvages	Unknown	TV miniseries
1983, 1992	Les Cinq Dernières Minutes	Haltman / Hafner	2 episodes
1987, 1989	William Tell	Tyroll / Tyrrol	2 episodes
1988	M'as-tu-vu ?	Unknown	1 episode
1990	Counterstrike	Kurtz	Episode: "The Lady of the Rhine"
1990	Cantara	Unknown	TV miniseries
1991	Navarro	Sauveur	1 episode
1991	Un privé au soleil	Unknown	1 episode
1991	Renseignements généraux	Baltar	1 episode
1992	The Case-Book of Sherlock Holmes	Hebworth (Alias Veitch)	1 episode
1992	The Young Indiana Jones Chronicles	German Officer #2	1 episode
1992	Sniper 2: L'affaire Petracci	Bababoum	TV movie
1992	Lycée alpin	Unknown	Unknown
1992	The New Statesman	Herr Wessel	1 episode
1993	La grande collection: Senso	Le général Hautmann	TV movie
1993	Le JAP, juge d'application des peines	Pol Van Hesse	1 episode
1995	Machinations	Unknown	TV movie
1995	La Rivière Espérance	Commandant du Duguay-Trouin	TV miniseries
1997	Inspecteur Moretti	Le Vieux	1 episode
2007	How Much We Hated Each Other	Konrad Adenauer	TV movie
2008	Collection Fred Vargas	Fulgence	2 episodes
