= Victor Ertmanis =

Canadian actor

Victor Ertmanis is a Canadian character actor known for his roles in television, film, and theatre. Ertmanis is a regular performer at the Stratford Festival.

== Filmography ==
=== Film ===
Year	Title	Role	Notes
1986	Overnight	Scott Lavel	
1987	Street Justice	Guard #1	
1988	Smokescreen	Sal	
1989	Physical Evidence	2nd Cop	
1989	The Dream Team	Man in Mets Jersey	
1989	Welcome Home	Willy	
1993	Change of Heart	Billy K	
1993	A Man in Uniform	Alley Cop	
1993	Paris, France	Michael	
1994	Brainscan	Martin	
1994	Back in Action	Cop	Uncredited
1994	Soft Deceit	Prison Guard	
1995	No Contest	Sergeant Zelinsky	
1995	Fools Die Fast	Vern	
1996	The Stupids	Garbageman #1	
1997	Murder at 1600	Cop Bartender	
1997	Reluctant Angel	Leo	
1998	Blind Faith	Henry Dolman	
2003	Rhinoceros Eyes	Sweets	

=== Television ===
Year	Title	Role	Notes
1985	The Ray Bradbury Theater	Paramedic	Episode: "The Crowd"
1985	Jimmy Valentine	Bates / Valentine	Television film
1985, 1987	Night Heat	Hoover	2 episodes
1986	American Playhouse	Bates / Valentine	Episode: "Valentine's Revenge"
1986	The Edison Twins	Ray	3 episodes
1987	Captain Power and the Soldiers of the Future	Interrogator	Episode: "The Abyss"
1987	Haunted by Her Past	Rowdie #2	Television film
1987–1989	Friday the 13th: The Series	(various)	3 episodes
1987–1992	Street Legal	(various)	4 episodes
1988	The Child Saver	Blue Collar Man	Television film
1988	My Secret Identity	Frank Matthews	Episode: "The Track Star"
1988	Emergency Room	Dan O'Brian	Episode #1.5
1989	Sorry, Wrong Number	Dispatcher	Television film
1989	Final Notice	Lester	Television film
1989	E.N.G.	Mr. Johnson	Episode: "Special Segment"
1989, 1997	The Hitchhiker	Mark Wallengreen / Charlie	2 episodes
1991	Counterstrike	Craver	Episode: "Verathion" (S1.E20)
1991	Counterstrike	Union Boss	Episode: "Going Home" (S2.E8)
1991–1993	Top Cops	Various roles	4 episodes
1992	Teamster Boss: The Jackie Presser Story	Danny Greene	Television film
1992	Beyond Reality	Becky's Father	Episode: "Demon in the Flame"
1992	The Good Fight	Ned Tabor	Television film
1992–1993	By Way of the Stars	Sam	6 episodes
1992–1993	Catwalk	Eddie Camden	4 episodes
1993	Gross Misconduct: The Life of Brian Spencer	RCMP Officer	Television film
1993	The Hidden Room	Kenneth	Episode: "While She Was Out"
1993	Kung Fu: The Legend Continues	Barker	Episode: "Redemption: Part 2"
1994	Getting Gotti	James McBratney	Television film
1994–1995	Due South	Staff Sgt. Meers	3 episodes
1995	Bloodknot	Boater	Television film
1995	Net Worth	Jimmy Skinner	Television film
1996	Side Effects	Det. Washnevski	Episode: "Sex, Death and Rock 'N' Roll"
1996	Radiant City	Nat	Television film
1996	Undue Influence	Colin Demming	Television film
1996	Dangerous Offender: The Marlene Moore Story	Police Officer	Television film
1997	While My Pretty One Sleeps	Big Charley	Television film
1997	Ed McBain's 87th Precinct: Heatwave	Repairman	Television film
1997	Breach of Faith: A Family of Cops II	Toni Pietrov	Television film
1997	Bad to the Bone	Motel Manager	Television film
1998	The Last Don II	Prison Guard	Episode #1.1
1999	Storm of the Century	Alex Haber	2 episodes
1999	Vendetta	John Duare	Television film
1999	Earth: Final Conflict	Dale Anders	Episode: "Crackdown"
1999	Dear America: So Far from Home	Mr. Fowler	Television film
2001	Chasing Cain	Foster	Television film
2001	Final Jeopardy	Doorman	Television film
2002	Street Time	Lawyer	Episode: "Lesser Evils"
2003	Word of Honor	Travis Beltran	Television film
2005	The Eleventh Hour	Ahmed Safir's Boss	Episode: "Bumpy Cover"
2016	Halcyon	Gavin Spencer	2 episodes
2019	Murdoch Mysteries	Daniel Nelson	Episode: "Sins of the Father"
2020	The Hardy Boys	Captain (Fishing Vessel)	Episode: "Welcome to Your Life"
