= Counterstrike (1990 TV series) =

Canadian and French series

- Counterstrike title screen
- Also known as: Force de frappe
- Genre: Action-adventure
- Starring: Simon MacCorkindale; Christopher Plummer; Tom Kneebone; James Purcell
- Countries of origin: Canada; France
- Original language: English
- No. of seasons: 3
- No. of episodes: 66

Production
- Executive producers: Denis Heroux; Robert Lantos; Larry Jacobson; Sonny Grosso; Steven DeNure
- Producer: Julian Marks
- Production locations: Toronto, Ontario; Paris, France
- Running time: 60 minutes
- Production companies: Alliance Communications Corporation; Grosso-Jacobson Productions; Atlantique Productions

Original release
- Network: CTV; TF1; USA Network
- Release: July 1, 1990 – May 9, 1993

Related
- List of Counterstrike episodes

Counterstrike is a Canadian-French crime-fighting, espionage, action-adventure television series. The series premiered in Canada on CTV, in France on TF1, and in the United States on the USA Network, on July 1, 1990. It ran for three seasons, airing 66 hour-long episodes in total.

== Synopsis ==
After his wife is kidnapped by terrorists, international industrialist Alexander Addington assembles a clandestine "Counterstrike Team" of troubleshooters to help combat terrorism around the world, vowing, "We must fight evil, no matter where, no matter when, and no matter what the cost."

Addington recruits Peter Sinclair from Scotland Yard to lead the team. They set up a French con artist and art/jewelry thief named Nicole "Nikki" Beaumont and blackmail her into joining because of her valuable criminal connections. The third team member is Luke Brenner, an American mercenary whom they rescue from a Mexican jail. Alexander's daughter Suzanne Addington designed and operates the team's computer systems. Other characters include Bennett and J.J. (aka Captain Johnson), Alexander's valet and pilot, respectively.

In the second episode of season two, Peter and Alexander encounter a French reporter named Gabrielle Germont whom they recruit into the team to prevent her from publishing a story about them. In the season's third episode Peter and Gabrielle rescue Hector Stone, an American CIA-operative and former Navy SEAL whose cover has been blown, and invite him to join the team.

Suzanne Addington was written out of the series at the beginning of the second season. Suzanne appears in one third season episode, although played by a different actress. In her stead Alexander employs a secretary named Hélène Previn who becomes his confidante.

== Cast ==
=== Main ===
- Christopher Plummer as Alexander Addington (1990–1993), a Toronto billionaire tycoon with headquarters in Paris. He was shot during his wife's kidnapping, after which he swore, "eternal hostility against every form of tyranny over the mind of man."
- Simon MacCorkindale as Peter Sinclair (1990–1993), a former Scotland Yard Inspector who quit the force five years ago.
- Cyrielle Clair as Nicole "Nikki" Beaumont (1990–1991), a French con-artist in the first season, who marries in season two.
- Stephen Shellen as Luke Brenner (1990–1991), the team's "strong-man," he was with the Army during action in Panama and Grenada. He is later killed during a mission in season two.
- Laurence Ashley-Taboulet as Suzanne Addington (1990–1991), Alexander's daughter in season one.
- Sophie Michaud as Gabrielle Germont (1991–1993), a magazine writer in season two and three.
- James Purcell as Hector Stone (1991–1993), an ex-Marine and Navy SEAL in season two and three.
- Patricia Cartier as Hélène Previn (1991–1993), Alexander's secretary in season two and three.
- Andre Mayers as J.J. (1990–1993), Alexander's pilot.
- Tom Kneebone as Bennett (1990–1993), Alexander's butler.

=== Recurring ===
- Susan Hogan as Bridgette (2 episodes), Suzanne's godmother and environmentalist introduced in "A Little Purity" and last seen in season three, "Bosnian Connection."
- Ron White as Detective Larry Larwin (4 episodes).
- Michel Voletti as Philippe Evran (7 episodes), a French Sûreté Police Inspector who was suspended after unfounded allegations of bribery. He is introduced running a bar in the season one episode, "Thanos." As his friend, Peter gives Phillippe information to help overcome the suspension. In season three "Till Death Do Us Part," Voletti is simply credited as "The Inspector." In "Bastille Day Terror," Voletti does not receive a screen credit at all, but is named Philippe in dialog while issuing an all-points bulletin.
- Vlasta Vrána as Detective Lt. Samuelson (2 episodes), a Toronto policeman who was first to respond to the kidnapping of Alexander Addington's wife Chantal in season one, "The Beginning" prior to the arrival of Sinclair. He reappears in season two, "Breaking Point" questioning Stone, who is suspected of murder.
- Janet-Laine Green as Claire (2 episodes), Peter's jealous ex-wife, she is introduced at the end of season one in "The Dilemma" and last seen in season two, "It's All in the Game."
- Rachel Palmieri as Suzanne Addington (2 episodes).

=== Notable guests ===
- Ernest Abuba
- Philip Akin
- Denis Akiyama
- Hrant Alianak
- Réal Andrews
- Jean-Pierre Aumont
- Teri Austin
- Val Avery
- Jank Azman
- Bob Bainborough
- Bernard Behrens
- Yves Beneyton
- Nigel Bennett
- Jean-Pierre Bernard
- Roberta Bizeau
- Robert Bockstael
- Walker Boone
- Geoffrey Bowes
- Laura Bruneau
- Tom Butler
- Nicholas Campbell
- Wanda Cannon
- Philippe Caroit
- Alex Carter
- Maxwell Caulfield
- Richard Chevolleau
- Milan Cheylov
- Juan Chioran
- George Chuvalo
- Eugene Clark
- Kim Coates
- Bradley Cole
- John Colicos
- Henry Czerny
- Jennifer Dale
- Lawrence Dane
- Damon D'Oliveira
- Ellen Dubin
- Deborah Duchêne
- Richard Eden
- David Eisner
- Christian Erickson
- Victor Ertmanis
- Nadia Farès
- Barry Flatman
- Page Fletcher
- Denis Forest
- Colin Fox
- David Fox
- Patricia Gage
- David Gardner
- Susan George
- Eugene Robert Glazer
- Anais Granofsky
- Mackenzie Gray
- Deborah Grover
- Brett Halsey
- David Hemblen
- Jill Hennessy
- Jacques Herlin
- Torri Higginson
- Michael Hogan
- Lisa Howard
- Kim Huffman
- Scott Hylands
- Robert Ito
- Latoya Jackson
- Shawne Jackson
- Clark Johnson
- Nahanni Johnstone
- Marc de Jonge
- John Kapelos
- Daniel Kash
- Mimi Kuzyk
- Heath Lamberts
- Christian Laurin
- Barbara Law
- Ron Lea
- Kate Lynch
- Catriona MacColl
- Daniel MacIvor
- Sean McCann
- Dean McDermott
- Stephen McHattie
- Billy Merasty
- Annie Mercier
- Belinda Metz
- Hans Meyer
- Charles Millot
- Richard Monette
- Frank Moore
- Louis Negin
- Brigitte Nielsen
- Frank Joseph Pellegrino
- Ross Petty
- Gordon Pinsent
- Chris Potter
- Jeremy Ratchford
- Michael J. Reynolds
- Julian Richings
- Laura M. Robinson
- Sebastian Roché
- Carlo Rota
- Andrea Roth
- Julie-Anne Roth
- Mary Beth Rubens
- James Saito
- Jacqueline Samuda
- Michael Sarrazin
- Booth Savage
- Alan Scarfe
- August Schellenberg
- Chuck Shamata
- Anthony Sherwood
- Cedric Smith
- Sonja Smits
- Elke Sommer
- Leslie Kay Sterling
- Robyn Stevan
- Guylaine St-Onge
- Marc Strange
- Karen Strassman
- Michel Subor
- Shawn Thompson
- Cali Timmins
- Corinne Touzet
- Raoul Trujillo
- Alexandra Vandernoot
- Sugith Varughese
- Chris Wiggins
- Tonya Lee Williams
- Jeff Wincott
- Joel Wyner
- Stephen Young
- Dominic Zamprogna
- Morton Downey Jr.
- Vanity

== Episodes ==
| Season | Episodes | Originally released | |
| Season | Episodes | First released | Last released |
|---|---|---|---|
| 1 | 22 | July 1, 1990 | February 2, 1991 |
| 2 | 22 | September 21, 1991 | May 9, 1992 |
| 3 | 22 | September 26, 1992 | May 9, 1993 |

== Awards and nominations ==
Counterstrike awards and nominations
| Year | Award | Category | Nominee(s) | Result | Ref. |
|---|---|---|---|---|---|
| 1992 | 6th Gemini | Best Performance by an Actor in a Continuing Leading Dramatic Role | Simon MacCorkindale | Nominated | |
| 1992 | 6th Gemini | Best Performance by an Actor in a Continuing Leading Dramatic Role | Christopher Plummer | Nominated | |
| 1994 | 8th Gemini | Best Performance by an Actress in a Continuing Leading Dramatic Role | Sophie Michaud in "Behind Bars" | Nominated | |
| 1994 | 8th Gemini | Best Performance by an Actor in a Continuing Leading Dramatic Role | James Purcell in "Going Home" | Won | |

== Broadcast ==
Counterstrike premiered in Canada on CTV and in France (as Force de frappe) on TF1 on July 1, 1990. It premiered in the United States on the USA Network on July 1, 1990.

Reruns aired in Canada on Showcase and TVtropolis.
