= List of Counterstrike (1990 TV series) episodes =

The following is an episode list of the 1990s Canadian crime-fighting, espionage, action-adventure television series Counterstrike.

The series premiered on July 1, 1990, airing on CTV in Canada, USA Network in the United States, and TF1 in France (as Force de Frappe). Sixty-six episodes were aired in three seasons from 1990 to 1993.

Each episode presents a self-contained mission, with occasional multi-episode story arcs exploring backstories and alliances of the principal characters involved in a covert international "Counterstrike Team" assembled and financed by wealthy industrialist Alexander Addington (played by Christopher Plummer). The team travels around the world, employing surveillance and undercover operations to address threats that lie beyond conventional law enforcement capabilities, such as terrorism, international crime syndicates, corporate espionage, and political corruption. Led by former Scotland Yard Inspector, Peter Sinclair (played by Simon MacCorkindale), the first season includes French con-artist and art thief Nicole "Nikki" Beaumont (played by Cyrielle Clair) and ex-Army mercenary Luke Brenner (played by Stephen Shellen). Season two introduces new team members after the characters Nikki and Luke are written out.

== Series overview ==
Season	Episodes	Originally released	
Season	Episodes	First released	Last released
1	22	July 1, 1990	February 2, 1991
2	22	September 21, 1991	May 9, 1992
3	22	September 26, 1992	May 9, 1993

== Episodes ==
=== Season 1 (1990–91) ===
No. overall	No. in season	Title	Directed by	Written by	Original release date
1	1	"Dealbreaker"	Mario Azzopardi	Richard Oleksiak	July 1, 1990
In Montreal, Annette Morley (Note: Susan George as Annette Morley) asks her husband Eric (Note: Chuck Shamata as Eric Morley) "What have you gotten yourself into?" He lies, and she is kidnapped, all because he is a dealbreaker. At the United Nations Plaza, a friend phones Alexander Addington at his Paris headquarters with a tip to ask Eric Morley what he knows about "sleeper" bomb detonators. Alexander tells his daughter Suzanne to ready the plane and contact Peter Sinclair, who is Annette's former lover. Eric's former CIA handler John Howard Cantrell (Note: Cedric Smith as Cantrell) tells him, the kidnapping can not lead back to the "company." Peter asks his former Scotland Yard boss, Inspector Dantley (Note: Lawrence Dane as Inspector Dantley) for Eric's file, while Luke Brenner gets a lead from Lex (Note: Jill Hennessy as Lex) to a Soviet Colonel named Kirkoff. (Note: Nigel Bennett as Kirkoff) J.J. flies the team to Chicago where Nicole "Nikki" Beaumont arranges an "accidental" meeting with Kirkoff, who, for a price, gives them the code name "Deacon." Bennett brings tea as Alexander informs the team that "Deacon" is actually Cantrell. After a run-in with Inspector Dantley, Peter confronts Eric and the Counterstrike team assembles to intercept the delivery of the detonators to terrorists.
2	2	"Dead in the Air"	Jorge Montesi	Tim Dunphy	July 8, 1990
At The Temple nightclub in D.C., Sarah warns Paco Rojo (Note: Raoul Trujillo as Rojo) to leave her younger sister Natalie alone, or she will expose his narco-import business; she is strangled to death in her car. A Justice Department contact tells Alexander that Rojo is planning to stop the American team in Colombia from indicting drug Baron Flores. In Vienna, Luke interrupts Peter's date at a Tchaikovsky ballet to respond to the threat. Alexander briefs his team that Rojo uses women as drug mules. Peter enlists Nicole as one of Rojo's new girls, to prevent the murder of the U.S. Prosecutor. Peter discovers Jackson, (Note: Anthony Sherwood as Jackson) a cop investigating for the DEA, tailing Rojo from the club. Someone informs Rojo he's under surveillance; a bomb nearly kills Luke and Peter. Luke suspects Jackson. Peter confronts Jackson and says he needs to talk to his partner, DaSilvia, an agent in the Colombian Secret Service; Jackson is gunned down. So, Peter tells DaSilvia that Rojo is an informant, to test if DaSilvia is corrupt. As Nikki and Natalie are about to board a flight to Bogotá, Peter and Luke rush to prevent a suitcase bomb from killing the U.S. Prosecutor and everyone else aboard.
3	3	"Now and at the Hour of Our Death"	Mario Azzopardi	Tony DiFranco	July 15, 1990
In San Pedro, (Note: San Pedro is a fictional nation in South America.) South America, Miguel meets Father Raphael Vera in the confessional to tell him, he's on the President's hit-list. Miguel hands Raphael intelligence to turn over to the U.N. committee to testify on human rights abuses. Vincenzo in Rome asks Alexander to help Vera, who is now in Boston with Father Milady, (Note: Michael Hogan as Father Milady) pastor of the Church of the Holy Angels, to arrive safely to New York City. Marco's (Note: Canadian actor Frank Pellegrino (born 1957) as Marco) death squad abducts Julio to obtain Vera's location. Luke and Nikki head to the church, and narrowly escape Marco. Posing as a business man, Peter meets the San Pedro Consul, Colonel Cortez. (Note: August Schellenberg as Cortez) To learn more about Cortez's business dealings, Peter also woos Cortez's assistant, Salomé La Roja. (Note: Jennifer Dale as Salomé) The team learns that Marco kidnapped Father Vera's mother as leverage, and a showdown ensues on Cortez's yacht, the Stella Borealis.
4	4	"Art for Art's Sake"	Jorge Montesi	Jim Henshaw	July 22, 1990
At the London Sutcliffe Museum, Lord Sutcliffe (Note: Colin Fox as Lord Sutcliffe) presents an iconic triptych to Milos Janzan (Note: David Hemblen as Milos Janzan) for repatriation to his Eastern bloc nation to serve as a symbol of the struggle for freedom against totalitarian communism. As Mr. McQueen unlocks the case, masked gunmen steal the icon. Suzanne briefs the team that it is worth thirteen-million pounds. Nikki and Luke investigate the art community, including the art forger Rettie, (Note: Julian Richings as Rettie) while Peter investigates the museum posing as a reporter. McQueen is shot outside Rettie's shop, hinting at an inside job. Luke talks to Roberto Mendez at a Soho club, and eventually gets a lead to a ship docked on the Thames. Peter talks to Scotland Yard Sgt. Luther (Note: Chris Wiggins as Sgt. Luther) and begins to suspect Lord Sutcliffe never wanted to release such a valuable artifact. While the museum guide (Note: Teri Austin as The Guide) leads a tour group, Luke poses as an art aficionado to case security measures. After anonymous tips, Luther catches Janzan with the triptych. On the docked boat, the team finds evidence that the triptych Janzan recovered might be a forgery. Sergeant Luther won't agree to a search warrant against Lord Sutcliffe, so the team must break into the museum to gather evidence.
5	5	"Power Play"	Mario Azzopardi	Angelo Stea, Peter Lauterman	July 29, 1990
At a Chicago hotel, after the reception for President Fauai (Note: Harvey Chao as Fauai) of Mahal, (Note: Mahal is a fictional nation in Southeast Asia.) someone drugs his wine and sets him up with a prostitute; Fauai wakes next to her slain body. Hardliner General Loctuck (Note: James Saito as General Loctuck) tells conference attendees that "Mahal is not for sale at any price," in a power play that reverses Fauai's position on signing a draft agreement for an American Naval Base in Mahal. Mr. Gottfried, concerned, calls Alexander and the team responds. Peter, posing as a banker, plants a bug in Fauai's room, learning that Fauai is being blackmailed with photos of the dead prostitute to warn him not to sign the agreement. Loctuck informs Fauai's financial consultant Nicholas Westic (Note: Nicholas Campbell as Westic) of the bug, which Westic disables. Nikki, posing as a maid, breaks into Westic's desk so the team can run a con to discover who is behind the blackmail, and thereby nullify the threat.
6	6	"A Little Purity"	George Mendeluk	David Rotenberg	August 5, 1990
In Toronto, Bridgette conducts environmental protests to shut down the chemical companies "permanently." Meanwhile, someone breaks into Chadway Chemicals, spray paints "EARTH NOW" and sets off a bomb that kills a guard. Bridgette, Suzanne's godmother, calls Alexander and denies involvement. Since Luke's army unit was exposed to enemy poison during action, Peter has him join Bridgette's group at City University. He befriends Bridgette's protégé Amy Fleming (Note: Laura Bruneau as Amy) and her brother Carter, (Note: Denis Forest as Carter) who was exposed to dioxin. Detective Larry Larwin tells Peter he interviewed Bridgette's people already. Peter poses as an insurance adjuster to Dean Banks (Note: Ross Petty as Dean Banks) to provide Nikki access to the Dean's office files. While Bridgette and her group protest outside Grafton Chemicals, someone slips inside with another bomb. Detective Larwin arrests Bridgette. Alexander's source at the Pentagon believes Grafton contracted the university to develop Sano Green, which "makes Agent Orange look like baby powder." Nikki cons Roger Clayton at the research wing for his badge number to investigate the lab. Earth Now protests against the university's research funding from Grafton, while the bomber slips inside to kill the Dean and Grafton executives. The team must stop the attack before any more lives are destroyed.
7	7	"Son with a Gun"	Paolo Barzman	Christian Watton	August 19, 1990
In Rome, Count Arturo Biondino chastises his son Enrico for hanging out with the criminal Donato. Two men make a drug deal and are gunned down by two others on a motorcycle belonging to Enrico. Biondino calls Alexander for help as Enrico has been charged with murder. Biondino then talks to Judge Cardono (Note: Jacques Herlin as Judge) about it, since Biondino is a candidate for Minister of Justice. The team discovers Enrico is also seeing a woman named Carlotta, who has ties to Donato. Secretly, Carlotta has been keeping Enrico drugged by injection. Nikki poses as Enrico's former girlfriend, a photographer named Claire, in order to infiltrate Donato's Inferno club and discover their plans. The motorcyclists strike again, stealing Enrico's prized rifle, but Biondino refuses to believe his son is a thief. Nikki's cover is blown, so Donato has Angelo take her away, while they go through with their plan to frame Enrico for the Judge's murder. Peter and Luke devise a plan to save the Judge, Nikki, and Enrico.
8	8	"The Lady of the Rhine"	Paolo Barzman	Eric Watton	August 26, 1990
In Rotterdam, Helmut stakes out suspicious activity at a warehouse and calls his editor, Lorraine Sydberg, (Note: Catriona MacColl as Lorraine) who is busy, so he leaves a message. He is murdered before he can report the full story of the Tulips on the Rhine. At International Focus Magazine in Los Angeles, Lorraine receives Helmut's photos. Alexander gets involved when Helmut's three-part story is late to publication. Peter meets Dr. Myerhoff to subtly ask whether he's seen Helmut. Luke and Nikki case Helmut's hotel room and instead find Lorraine; Nikki palms her answering machine cassette tape. At Mayerhoff Ltd., Kurtz (Note: Hans Meyer as Kurtz) warns Dr. Myerhoff to keep quiet until the deal with the oil cartel is completed. Peter hears a nautical bell on Lorraine's tape, and Luke "woos" Lorraine in order to plant a tracker, which leads them all to the scene of the murder and the warehouse. The team also learns that radioactive waste is involved, so Peter confronts Myerhoff, but they are both caught by Kurtz. Luke and Nikki must rescue Peter and stop Kurtz from escaping.
9	9	"Knights of Aram"	Jean-Pierre Prévost	Richard Oleksiak	September 9, 1990
In Paris, Pokov hands Admiral Westgate the detonator circuit, but $50,000 isn't enough. Instead of a bonus, Pokov gets a bullet. Career diplomat, Count Antonio Debroca calls Alexander about "hostages taken in the Middle East..." and "...the fate of your wife." But Debroca is hung from a bridge, an apparent suicide. Alexander gets an anonymous call in code. "The Master was not lost. He was murdered. The Flaming Star is on the ascendancy...our brother fought against it. We know that you hold the Pentacle of Lightning. Use it." At the crematorium, Brother Paulo Augustine gives Westgate the Master's ashes. After Paulo tries to kill Peter, Alexander reveals he and Debroca were with The Knights of Aram. He provides two names, Kempler and Griffen, and worries that something "catastrophic was imminent," perhaps a neutron bomb. Peter tracks down Griffen, while Luke and Nikki find Kempler. Kempler calls Alexander to say, "The New Temple is in sight," making Kempler the new Master. Peter goes undercover as a neophyte knight and the team learns Kempler wants to level Beirut where he intends to build their new temple. Peter is discovered, so Luke and Nikki must rescue him and stop Kempler.
10	10	"Extreme Measures"	Michael Shock	Michael Zettler, Shelly Altman	September 16, 1990
Peter gets wine at Grenier's Cave Selections when Jean-Paul Grenier is shot. Seven other murders relate to his former revolutionary group, Alpha Titan. The team investigates four remaining members to find the killer, while faking their deaths to take them off the list. Peter flies to Marseille to "kill" smuggler Pierre Yamam; Luke goes to Gandar (Note: Gandar is a fictional nation in West Africa.) as a spice buyer to meet Jutai, who is now head of the Secret Police; Niki stays in London posing as a reporter for Think Magazine to meet "King of Rap" Nigel. Nikki learns Lady Forrester had a daughter by Otto Berger, Titan's treasurer and a thief before he became ill and died in 1967. So Luke heads to Hronigsburg (Note: Hronigsburg is a fictional township in Austria.) to talk to Otto's brother Joseph. On a hunch from a clue, Luke digs up Otto's grave and finds money. The team hunts through his files, finding a lead to Salzburg where Otto may still be alive and running for office under the alias, Kurt Schmidt. Meanwhile, Grenier has escaped protective custody. Joseph goes after Grenier with a gun, forcing the team to kill Joseph. They find Otto, and Nikki poses as his daughter to blackmail him, thus tipping his hand.
11	11	"Thanos"	Doug Jackson	Christian Watton	October 7, 1990
"When can I expect delivery?" Amman asks Bouchareb, referring to NATO's top-secret Thanos missile targeting system. As they discuss business, Bouchareb's wife Jeanne tries to flee with their two daughters to meet Nikki, but they are stopped. Amman takes the children to ensure delivery. Bouchareb tells Jeanne she can be the wife, or the late wife, of the new Prime Minister of Souadieh (Note: Souadieh is a fictional Arab nation.) after the coup. Nikki poses as a saleswoman to contact Jeanne, not realizing the house is bugged; Amman sends men to gun her down. Peter visits his friend Philippe Evran, a French Police Inspector who was suspended after unfounded allegations of bribery, and now runs a bar whose waitress Marie (Note: Julie-Anne Roth (Julie-Anne Rauth) as Marie) hits on Peter. With his connections within the department, Philippe, Peter and Nikki narrow down the inside man to three suspects, of which Henri Duvall is the most likely. Wearing masks, Nikki and Luke "kidnap" Jeanne to free her from her husband, and find out who has her children. Peter enlists Andre to copy the device. The team uses Duvall's gambling addiction to isolate him to deny Thanos to Bouchareb, and recover the children from Amman.
12	12	"Siege"	Bernard Dumont	Peter Mohan	October 14, 1990
At Chateau de Coeur, masked men infiltrate the building. Alexander prepares to address Prime Minister Mohammed Haddad's symposium for industrialist education in third-world nations. Their conversation is interrupted with demands by the terrorist group October Justice, who have captured the wives of world leaders at the chateau. Haddad, a reformer who values women's rights, is Akmed's target. Peter has Luke infiltrate the building, while Nikki poses as Sophie, one of the wives. The terrorists place Mohammed's wife on a pressure plate attached to a bomb demanding they turn over Mohammed within four hours. The team goes up against seven machine-gun wielding terrorists, as the bomb timer counts down to zero.
13	13	"Escape Route"	Paolo Barzman	Chantal Renaud	October 28, 1990
The alarm sounds, police arrive, and one of the bank robbers is shot while the other two escape. Veronique (Note: Corinne Touzet as Veronique) wants to leave Paris, but Rene Verlaine says not until his brother Georges is free from prison. To give police someone else to chase, Veronique suggests posing as the Social Liberation Front to give the city an ultimatum: assassinate rich industrialists one-by-one until Georges' release, and Alexander Addington is on the hit-list! Newly reinstated Inspector Philippe Evran receives the call after the first murder, and tells Peter that Georges is a safe-cracker who worked with his brother Rene. Luke goes to prison to watch Georges, Peter poses as Luke's lawyer, and Nicole infiltrates the SLF. Peter learns from Philippe that they communicate with Georges through the classifieds. Rene tests Nikki by tasking her to slay the American honeymooners Mike (Note: Sebastian Roché as Mike) and Sandy (Note: Karen Strassman as Sandy) whose houseboat they've occupied. Nikki convinces them that killing innocent civilians is not what the SLF stands for; instead she picks Alexander as the target so she can fake the assassination. As Rene tries to help Georges escape, the team closes in on the killers.
14	14	"The Beginning"	Allan Eastman	Landen Parker	November 10, 1990
From their Toronto home, Alexander and Chantal Addington (Note: Barbara Law as Chantal) drive to an Ambassadorial function. Terrorists kidnap Chantal and shoot Alexander in the knee. Lt. Samuelson supervises, but Alexander had the Home Secretary send hostage expert, Peter Sinclair. Baader-Meinhof mercenary Hans Kruger demands guns, missiles, Katyushas, and semtex to be parachuted into Angola. Peter finds the car. Suzanne tracks phone calls. Samuelson storms the house, killing terrorists; Chantal wasn't there. Without leads, the taskforce disbands. Alexander tells Peter "I can untie your hands...." Peter has contacts who "both have connections with Kruger." After 17 years of "by-the-book" Scotland Yard work, Peter insists on "drawing the lines." In Paris, Countess Rosamond (aka Nicole) sells Alexander a Picasso forgery. Now possessing two-million counterfeit francs, Peter blackmails her into joining. Nikki, posing as Luke's wife, arranges his Mexican jailbreak. They setup Paris headquarters. Suzanne quits Sorbonne University to design their computers. Kruger calls with instructions, Suzanne traces it, and Captain Johnson flies to Brandenburg. As Kruger's ex-lover, Nikki knows the location. Arrested, Kruger says Chantal is "in the bottom of Lake Ontario." Alexander believes Kruger lied. Susan says oil magnate Chisolm was jailed in Sumatra for high treason. Alexander yells, "Bennet! Get me Peter Sinclair..."
15	15	"Cry of the Children"	Mario Azzopardi	Tony DiFranco	November 17, 1990
Zoe secures the baby in the car and tells Manny (Note: John Kapelos as Manny) to get the last box. She drives away without him. Zoe tells her ex-boyfriend Luke she's in trouble, and claims baby Gabby is his daughter. Manny assures Mr. Laurence he'll get Gabby back. Laurence says Zoe "knows too much." In New York, while Luke goes for diapers, Manny shoots Zoe and takes Gabby. Detective Larry Larwin arrests Luke for attempted murder. Alexander tells Peter and Nikki that Mrs. Jackson has bailed Zoe out in the past. Peter goes to bail out Luke, while Nike learns that Mrs. Jackson is Zoe's mother, and that Zoe cannot conceive after an abortion five years prior. In Toronto, Laurence sends Andrea (Note: Laura M. Robinson as Andrea) to finish what Manny couldn't, but Nikki and Peter are waiting at the hospital for another attempt on Zoe's life. Andrea's airline ticket leads them to Laurence's law firm and his illegal adoption ring. Peter and Nikki pose as adoptive parents to trap Laurence.
16	16	"Masks"	Donald Shebib	Christian Watton	November 24, 1990
"There! The limp...that wound obviously still pains him." (Note: Alexander was shot in the knee during his wife's kidnapping, as portrayed in "The Beginning.") The Double replies, "I got it," lifting a cigarette. Amanda, (Note: Patricia Gage as Amanda) that's a "habit you'll have to lose...now. The conference is only three weeks away." Double, "I'm ready." Doctor, "There may be...involuntary twitching of the facial muscles." Amanda, "one thing more..." The double shoots the doctor. Alexander briefs the team about the assassination of Greek Parliament member George Stenopolis, involved in the ban of chemical weapons, and a key member of the Alliance of International Chemical Producers. There was a witness; 12 year-old American Gypsy, Gregory. In New York, Alexander greets his former executive assistant, Amanda. The team poses as tourists to attract pick pockets. As the tour guide (Note: Ellen Dubin as Tour Guide) talks, Luke catches a boy who knows Gregory. A Gypsy woman leads Nikki to Gregory. The double-switch is made in the limo. They plan to kill Alexander after the reversing his anti-chemical speech. In Paris, Susanne and Bennett watch the televised conference, and become concerned at "Alexander's" behavior. They advise the team. Peter becomes alarmed when Amanda resumes her role as Addington's assistant. Luke plants a tracker on Gregory that leads him to Alexander. They rush to the conference to give Alexander's speech.
17	17	"Mindbender"	Allan Eastman	Richard Oleksiak	December 1, 1990
Boris (Note: Milan Cheylov as Boris) presents Major Zukova (Note: Heidi von Palleske as Major Zukova) the candidates; Brenner, Luke. Born 1960, Fair Lake, Minnesota. American Army 1978-80, Action; Nicaragua, Namibia, Middle East. Zukova, "Get me complete dossier." At the bar, Luke chats up Annette Weston...who spikes his drink. Late for the flight, Peter and Nikki begin to worry. Dr. Bruegei briefs Zukova on the Mindbender process. J.J. tells Peter where Luke might've gone. Programming complete after a test fire, Luke returns to the team, but Nikki senses something is off. Suzanne says there were storms in The Bahamas where Luke claimed to have vacationed. She also traces a call Luke makes to a restricted line for the Russian Delegation of the United Nations. As Peter and Nikki talk to Dr. W. Burns (Note: Bernard Behrens as Dr. Burns) at the State Street Clinic, Luke eavesdrops; fearing psychiatric commitment, Luke flees the clinic. Suzanne learns the call was made to GRU Major Zukova of Russian Military Intelligence. Boris gets Luke to a phone where he is triggered and kills someone to escape the hospital. Nikki poses as a Russian lesbian to plant a bug on Zukova. Peter listens to their plans; the assassination of President Mikhail Gorbachev, (Note: David Lloyd Austin as Mikhail Gorbachev) which the team must now prevent.
18	18	"Regal Connection"	William Fruet	Tony DiFranco	December 15, 1990
After Suzanne and Professor Robert Williams (Note: Anthony Sherwood as Robert) debug a computer, Robert is kidnapped. His wife Yvonne (Note: Shawne Jackson as Yvonne) calls Suzanne to report him missing. Peter investigates. Baganda explains they are from a Burkina Faso tribe whose King Mabundi is near death, and Robert has a regal connection; he is heir to the throne. Their daughter Lisa saw the abduction and provides Nikki clues. Van Gelder (Note: Maxwell Caulfield as Van Gelder) and two other military men, interested in the tribal lands' gold and mineral wealth, kidnap Luke and torture him for Robert's location. Luke calls Peter, ostensibly to arrange an exchange, but really to alert him to the greater threat. J.J. doubles for Robert, while Nikki sets a surprise for Van Gelder's men. They get Luke back, and eventually Peter and Suzanne narrow down Robert's location to the docks. Baganda's and Van Gelder's men battle each other on the docks and aboard the ship. The team joins the fray, unaware that one of Baganda's aides has betrayed him.
19	19	"Cinema Verite"	René Bonnière	Eric Watton	December 22, 1990
In his Niagra on the Lake home, Executive Producer Michael Marlowe (Note: Cedric Smith as Marlowe) and Diane Wilson toast to "buckets of Hollywood money, and to literature, and to..." Murder! Drowned in the bathtub and dumped in the lake to look like a fishing boat accident, but as a fan of Marlowe's intrigue novels, Alexander isn't buying it. Suzanne confirms, Marlowe was a U.S. Olympic swimmer. Peter finds absolutely zero fingerprints in the bathroom; not even Marlowe's. Nikki poses as a Weekly Review reporter and talks to Michael's agent, Scott Wagner (Note: Eugene Robert Glazer as Scott) and Wagner's assistant Diane. Scott and Marlowe's widow Samantha Marlowe née Sims argue. Someone tries to kill Samantha too. Luke recognizes an Army buddy, Sandy (Note: Réal Andrews as Sandy) who is now a stuntman for Buffalo Blues, a film from a screenplay credited to Marlowe, but largely written by Wagner. Luke, Sandy and Nikki talk to an actress portraying a cop (Note: Kim Huffman as Cop) who witnessed Michael and Scott arguing. Meanwhile, Scott asks Vince why Samantha isn't dead yet. The team's investigation eventually lead to a cargo ship ordered for the production; Vince and his men are using it to smuggle drugs. Nikki is captured onboard. Peter, Luke, and J.J. must stop the drugs and rescue Nikki.
20	20	"Verathion"	Donald Shebib	Chantal Renaud	January 12, 1991
At Amnoxo Pharmaceuticals, Research Division, Tom stealthily prints a report. At the Hilton, Suzanne chats with Alexander...and Tom, who says "meet me at Union Station." Tom is shot while giving her a briefcase. Suzanne runs, hides the briefcase in a locker, calls her father, and gives the key to a transient named Clara, but Craver (Note: Victor Ertmanis as Craver) captures Suzanne. In Chicago, Peter is...occupied, so Alexander calls Nikki. Craver tells Wylie what happened. Clara eventually finds the locker, but the briefcase is locked. Detective Larwin tells Peter that Tom is dead. Susanne tells Craver that Peter Sinclair is her uncle and he has the report. Cynthia, in personnel at the Addington Group, calls Peter relaying the information, and Peter gives her his hotel room number. Hit-man Nick Samuels arrives to coerce the report from Peter, but he is saved by Luke posing as room service. Nikki poses as a reporter to interview Wylie about drug fraud, while Luke tracks down Clara and the briefcase. Peter goes directly to Wylie to negotiate the exchange, but Craver realizes he can get more money ransoming Alexander's daughter, so he shoots Wylie. The team must rescue Suzanne and stop Craver before anyone else dies.
21	21	"The Millerton Papers"	George Mendeluk	Eric Watton	January 19, 1991
In Cleveland, Jason (Note: Page Fletcher as Jason) sneaks into Nikki's room, surprising her. Nikki, "What do you want?" Jason, "What I've always wanted." Nikki, "Money!" Jason, "No. You...and Money." But that was "another life." Jason shows her $500,000 in loot he stole from Bernard Millerton. She clears a leave of absence with Alexander to handle it. Peter, worried, investigates. After a drive-by, she insists on returning it to Millerton! Peter plants a tracker on the bag, and poses as a detective to Millerton. A manufacturer of toy aircraft models, he pretends he wasn't robbed. But J.J. suggests he's getting inside information based on an advanced stealth design that isn't yet on the market. Peter and Alexander begin to suspect industrial espionage. Peter confronts Millerton. By mistake, he received the full plans for the Alpha 9 ballistic missile, which was amongst his safe contents. Millerton is shot by a sniper. Jason takes only the jewels, ditching the bag...and plans. Nikki and Jason are captured. Peter calls Nikki, sets a meeting with Porzan, and Jemal (Note: Hrant Alianak as Jemal) escorts Nikki at gunpoint. The exchange is made, Nikki for the bag...which still has the tracker. The team follows them to rescue Jason.
22	22	"The Dilemma"	Jean-Pierre Prévost	Richard Oleksiak	February 2, 1991
Peter wakes sweating after nightmarish flashbacks of six years of violence. Bank robberies in East Berlin pit them against arms suppliers. Peter tells Alexander, doubts are "playing havoc with my conscience." C-4 was used, so Luke tries selling through Pascal DiMarco to discover the source; Irishman, Adrian Crisp. Nikki confirms, East Germany gave sanctuary to The IRA. Peter investigates further. He's abducted, beaten, and warned off. Robert Walters in London says it was British Intelligence officer, Colonel Nathan (Note: Scott Hylands as Colonel Nathan) who also tracks IRA chief, O'Brian. Peter calls the job off, telling Alexander the risk is too great, and they don't have the manpower. Alexander is livid; Crisp was involved with Kruger, who kidnapped his wife Chantal. (Note: As portrayed in "The Beginning.") In Windsor, Peter takes solace with his wife Claire Sinclair. Nikki tells Peter that Alexander ordered the operation forward, and Luke is doing the deal. Suspicious, Crisp shoots Luke. Nathan and his Sergeant (Note: Bob Bainborough as Sergeant) prepare to strike against Crisp and O'Brian. Nikki, about go after Luke, is stopped by Peter who carries Luke out, and they leave as Nathan's raid begins. They take Luke to the hospital, in critical condition. Alexander asks, "What went wrong...?" Peter, "I think we lost our center." Alexander apologizes.

=== Season 2 (1991–92) ===
No. overall	No. in season	Title	Directed by	Written by	Original release date
23	1	"Tie a Yellow Ribbon"	Allan Eastman	Richard Oleksiak	September 21, 1991
Luke relives being shot, waking in the hospital. Luke and Peter argue. The IRA gives hitman Mallick (Note: Ron Lea as Mallick) pictures of Peter and Luke (payback for events in "The Dilemma"). Alexander gets the news, Nichole is getting married. In Detroit, Mallick kills Pascal DiMarco for being "careless." The son of Vietnam veteran Ernie (Note: Géza Kovács as Ernie) just died. He flips out and draws a knife. Luke, recognizing PTSD, orders Ernie out of the hospital like a C.O. would. Mallick is not far behind. Robert Harley Went tells Alexander there's a contract on Peter and Luke. Mallick, as a cop, questions Ernie's ex-wife Maureen. (Note: Kate Lynch as Maureen) J.J. joins Peter in the search for Luke. Susanne helps Alexander find a new executive assistant and tells her father she's starting work in Baltimore. Bennett displays Ernie Brand's files to Alexander. In Chester, Michigan, Luke buys supplies with his credit card, giving Peter his location. Ernie leads Luke deep into the boonies. Both Peter and Mallick try to find them. Someone leads Peter into a pit trap. Díez and Recon link up with Ernie and Luke; it's "Time to Rock & Roll!" They capture Mallick. Wounded, Mallick draws Luke in and purposefully sets off a Claymore mine, killing them both.
24	2	"Hidden Assets"	René Bonnière	Tony DiFranco	September 28, 1991
Sheldon Blake (Note: Heath Lamberts as Sheldon Blake) asks Alexander to protect Saul while he writes his next explosive exposé book. Hélène Previn interviews as Alexander's next executive assistant and eventually lands it. A motorcyclist in black trails Peter. Peter has his contact find safe houses, and "pros" currently in town. He asks Sam to "babysit" ...dressed in "full gear," and asks Jeremy (Note: Jeremy Ratchford as Jeremy) to guard Saul. Peter finds someone is in his apartment...in his bathtub...naked. It's Gabrielle Germont, the journalist, there to interview him, or else. When he refuses, she previews Sheldon's "Hidden Assets" memorandum. Peter realizes she's already been tracking a "vigilante group" for some time...a whole year, as it turns out. She publishes the story: "Ex-Scotland Yard Whiz Kid Protecting Best-Selling Author." The two hitmen prepare; one for Sinclair, one for Germont. While moving to another safe house, the gunmen attack. They mow down Saul, critically wounding both Sam and Jeremy. Germont continues photographing, but she's in tears when the newswoman reveals Saul's death. Peter confronts her...not every story should be told. She turns over all her research to Alexander, who asks if she wants a job, just as a surprise guest arrives.
25	3	"Fall From Grace"	Allan Eastman	Richard Oleksiak	October 5, 1991
In D.C., Alexander meets Senator Fisk (Note: David Gardner as Fisk) who says there's new information about Noriega, and Hector Stone will need help. In Panama City, Hector roughs up Carlos to send a message to Colonel Reaz...Hector wants those papers. Reaz cleans his safe to retire to a ranch in Virginia after selling the papers. Victoria Condrade (Note: Jacqueline Samuda as Vickie) tells her lover Hector that Reaz plans to kill him. Peter and Gabrielle search for Hector, with help from Wes. Carlos makes a side-deal with the "Agency." Stone confronts Carlos, but Peter must rescue him from gunfire; they leave for D.C.. Agents arrest Reaz in America; Vickie escapes. When Stone isn't at the contact phone, she finds the files herself. Stone bribes Panamanian Secretary Lopez (Note: Hrant Alianak as Lopez) to locate Reaz, but he's already dead. So Stone pays instead for Vikie's whereabouts...after disabling comms to slip the team and rendezvous with Vickie. Expecting Hector, Vickie instead finds Carlos at the door. The team is too late to save her. Agents take the files and Carlos is "killed while escaping." Alexander is angry with Fisk, who never intended to disclose the papers. To Fisk's dismay, Vickie made copies before she died.
26	4	"It's All in the Game"	Gilbert M. Shilton	Michael Leo Donovan	October 12, 1991
In Toronto, Professor Kistler (Note: Chris Wiggins as Kistler) ignores the skipping of a Mozart LP to finish his formula, as Andrea (Note: Jennifer Dale as Andrea) interrupts. Alexander calls. Kistler has done it! Cold fusion! "Pizza?" With extra chloroform...Kistler, and his research, is taken. Dean Cartwright tells Addington that Kistler's missing. In London, Peter and Claire Sinclair make out, "It's amazing what a divorce can do!" J.J. flies Peter and the team out. Addington's competitor, Conrad Strand (Note: Michael Sarrazin as Strand) has Kurt make Kistler comfortable for an "extended" stay. Kistler won't cooperate. Strand suggests Andrea might. Gabrielle and Hector question Andrea...who goes "missing" as well, back to her lover, Conrad. Peter orders a check on the Andrea's Iranian Research Institute which leads to a parent corporation. Strand interferes with the plane remotely, forcing J.J. and Peter to land manually. Angry that Addington wouldn't fund his R&D, Strand forces the team into "The game of a lifetime," a deadly maze that he devised. Strand shows Addington video of the team's progress. Hélène finds the electric company, and Addington has power to the building cut off. J.J. regains control of the plane and the team escapes, but so do Strand and Andrea. Kistler missed a decimal point, sending him back to chalk board.
27	5	"Hide and Seek"	George Mendeluk	Richard Oleksiak	October 19, 1991
Mike and Mariam wonder when can stop looking over their back. As a cop, Mike is close to having enough evidence on psychopath Rik Allen (Note: Jeff Wincott as Rik Allen) for a bust. But Allen plants a car bomb that kills them both along with their daughter and son Terry. (Note: Dominic Zamprogna as Terry) Detective Larwin tells Peter the bad news, explaining, Allen fled to Brazil where there is no extradition treaty with America. Addington tells Peter to contact Vice Consul Trudy Grey in Rio de Janeiro. As Stone surveils him at an art gallery, Allen tells Costas he wants that visa, and how much? Peter and Larry squeeze Allen on both sides by convince Allen that the IRS froze his accounts. Gabrielle poses as a courier to delivery $20K of emergency funds. Grey is willing to help, but unofficially. Costas wants even more money for the visa. Allen gives him a down payment but it's not enough. He sends three guys after Allen, while he's on a "date" with Gabrielle. Hector doubts Gabrielle's professionalism when she expresses sympathy for Rik. They fake a fight to run a con on Allen involving counterfeit money as a means to arrest him on American "soil" ...in Brazil.
28	6	"Native Warriors"	Alan Simmonds	Ann MacNaughton	October 26, 1991
At Kahnekahtake, (Note: Kahnekahtake is the name of a fictional First Nations reserve.) underground filmmaker Ron Smith (Note: Nicholas Campbell as Ron Smith) interviews Hawk (Note: Billy Merasty as Hawk) about twenty years of toxic waste dumping, which is akin to murder. "My people where warriors before and we shall be warriors again." U.S. Senator David Willis (Note: Brett Halsey as Senator) investigates, but Hawk, voting no confidence, has armed native warriors take him hostage intending to try Willis for murder. Addington's friend St. John (Note: August Schellenberg as St. John) acts as liaison at Hawk's request. The reserve straddles U.S. and Canadian borders, so Alexander's Counterstrike team try to defuse the volatile standoff to prevent a massacre. Stone helps Gabrielle infiltrate, while Smith's background is checked. Gabrielle interviews Elsie, the wife of the former Chief who died of cancer from pollution. Peter arrives with St. John to negotiate. Addington reasons with the President and the Canadian Minister of Indian Affairs to withdraw troops. A sergeant heckles Elsie and calls her "squaw." Elsie doesn't back down; unarmed, she walks forward and the sergeant takes aim. Secretly, Smith fires a handgun. In response, the sergeant shoots Elsie, and the two forces exchange rifle fire. Stone spies Smith returning by boat after sabotaging the dam. Hawk decides to negotiate, Smith dissuades him. Stone tries to disable the bomb it before it's too late.
29	7	"Breaking Point"	George Mendeluk	Stephen Alix	November 2, 1991
At Universal Consultants Ltd., a CIA front company, Frank Percy says "We've never put nuclear weapons into the hands of fanatics." Arms-dealer Kirk Gagosian replies, he and Jake Levy already had an agreement, and he's no fanatic, "just a businessman." Hector gets a message and tells Peter that Frank is a friend in trouble. Hector finds Frank dead, and Detective Samuelson questions him. At the wake, Frank's widow Kathleen (Note: Wanda Cannon as Kate) tells Jake he's not welcomed. Oliver Bell tells Alexander it's a CIA matter and to stay out of it. Gabrielle tails Kirk, while Peter trails Jake, but Jake, spotting him, calls local police to arrest Peter for grand theft auto. Stone plants a bug and Gabrielle poses as a hooker to learn where Kirk might be shipping contraband. Frank's son Sam tells Hector what he knows, while Samuelson tells Sinclair about 35 tons of stolen maraging 350 steel, appropriate to making missile casings and uranium enrichment centrifuges. Peter deduces it's for the Pakistan nuclear program. As a material that is closely monitored by international authorities, the team must stop the steel shipment before it leaves the country, and get justice for Frank's family.
30	8	"Going Home"	Jorge Montesi	Richard Oleksiak	November 9, 1991
The Philadelphia Examiner reads, "NOVA to End Decay and Corruption," but mob boss Luca (Note: American actor Frank Joseph Pellegrino (born 1944) as Luca) rhetorically asks Nicky, (Note: Stephen McHattie as Nick) "you want NOVA to redevelop for you?" and "Norman, (Note: Richard Monette as Norman) maybe you?" They mean to sabotage Addington's city trade center project. The union boss (Note: Victor Ertmanis as an unnamed Union Boss) sneers, "the contract stinks" and chases off Addington's foreman, Pynn. He tells Peter, locals won't "play ball" without "customary graft, kickbacks, favors, commissions." Going home to Philly, Stone shows his Local 663 union card for a job...undercover. Union thugs assault him, but Nick arrives...Hector's old friend. Peter and Gabrielle reconstruct Pynn's files. The union boss terrorizes Pynn with a submachine gun; Pynn quits. Nick advises, ask Al for work, as Hector reconnects with nightclub singer Angie. (Note: Belinda Metz as Angie) Hector becomes conflicted with the operation. Peter confronts Norman about city hall reneging their contract. The boss nearly runs Peter down. Luca tells Hector, "Sony" means "Soon to Own New York." He won't let the Japanese own Philly. Luca and his union boss conspire to dynamite the construction trailer...and Peter, with Hector pushing the button. When Hector won't comply, he's taken to Luca for torture...and Angie too. Peter and Gabrielle pressure Nick for Hector's location before it's too late.
31	9	"Survival Instinct"	Mario Azzopardi	Karen Janigan	November 16, 1991
"Monkeys" "ladies" and "Rambo" have their survival instincts tested with a live fire exercise that kills Rialto. Clark Reynolds tells Addington, "Training accidents don't happen to men like Rialto...we need a replacement." In his New England training camp for international mercenaries and terrorists, Colonel Elmo Eustace Grant, who was court-martialed for executing civilians, tells Lance (Note: Kim Coates as Lance) to take the new Addington "recruits" ...and their cell phones. Lance hacks the team's files. Stone's Navy SEALs experience stands out. Grant tells Lance, no "more personnel mistakes." Hélène informs Alexander of the computer breach. "Perfect!" Peter and Gabrielle test data/phone lines looking for computer access. Stone explores the camp, but Lance finds him. Stone tells Grant he wants in on the action. Gabrielle hacks Grant's mainframe, granting Hélène access. Lance pits Stone against Sinclair, and Hector knocks out Peter. Grant, impressed, briefs Stone on "Operation Payback" in London, beginning with a heavy ordinance heist at PIC Munitions. Lance grabs the security guard, "Good evening, Andy." Andy asks, "Where's my money?" They load C-4. Gabrielle is caught hacking. The FBI commences their sting operation. Stone must collect enough evidence to incriminate Lance and Grant, and save Gabrielle and Peter from execution.
32	10	"Night of the Black Moon"	Miklós Lente	Tony DiFranco	November 23, 1991
The Addington Electronics anti-missile technology deal is signed with Chinese-Canadian defense contractor Charles Hope, (Note: Robert Ito as Charles Hope) and Canadian Minister of National Defense Raymond Cromwell. Ang insists, "It's time to leave now, Ms. Hope." May protests, "Not so soon, Ang!" The code-phrase is spoken, "The Moon is Black." Shopping is over, as Chinatown thugs kidnap May. "Uncle" Lok (Note: Denis Akiyama as Lok) calls May's father. Charles asks, "What do you want?" Lok wants, "The dragon's share." With May hostage, Charles reneges on the signing. Concerned, Alexander sends Stone to investigate, while Peter trains Gabrielle on machine pistols. Charles asks, "How much does Lok want?" Chaing (Note: Ernest Abuba as Chaing) replies, "Mr. Lok doesn't want money," merely to be "included in your new military contract." Stone intervenes in the ensuing fight. Restaurateur Mr. Fung interjects, "We don't need Kung Fu heroes here." Stone later identifies Chaing, and Gabrielle's research reveals Mr. Fung was a triad boss, and Chaing a Korean arms smuggler. They bug Charles' phone, learning May was taken. Chaing kills Ang and takes Charles to Lok. Fung explains the blood brotherhood symbol, "Black Moon with Blood." Peter convinces Fung to supply an address. Peter and Gabrielle try to rescue May, while Stone must battle Hapkido master, Chaing.
33	11	"Fire in the Streets"	Allan Eastman	Tony DiFranco	November 30, 1991
Deputy Mayor Joseph Falcon brags about PR for the upcoming ribbon cutting. Alexander quips, "Quite a coup for you," but it's "a housing project for the poor, not a new financial center." An activist for the homeless, Alan Clayton (Note: Eugene Clark as Clayton) yells, "Tell the press what you're really doing!" Falcon dismisses him as a rabble-rouser. During the photo shoot on-site at the Addington Engineering NOVA project, the photographer knocks a kid away from his equipment, eliciting a violent response. Alexander is surprised when Clayton tells him there are still people living in the condemned buildings. Clayton invites him inside for a tour. Meanwhile, the photographer phones police about his busted $8,000 camera. Alexander, appalled at conditions, offers medical assistance to a new mother and child. In another apartment, drug-pusher Nicky (Note: Canadian actor Frank Pellegrino (born 1957) as Nicky) draws a gun, sending Falcon into a heart attack. Police arrive followed by press. Captain Murphy, (Note: Sean McCann as Captain Murphy) assuming a hostage situation, orders Clayton to release them. Hélène calls the team. Clayton, not trusting police, negotiates with Sinclair to get his people medical care. While Stone infiltrates secretly, Gabrielle goes in with a phone, but she's intercepted by Nicky at gunpoint. Alexander switches places with her, and must make a life-or-death decision.
34	12	"In the Blood"	René Bonnière	Michael Leo Donovan	December 7, 1991
Yugoslavian Cultural Attaché Stash Janic (Note: Nigel Bennett as Stash) updates Alexander on his teen goddaughter Carmilla's progress at her tennis match. The Terminator kills Coach Trevin. Alexander wonders why Stash wasn't targeted. Stash sends Camilla to Long Island to train with family friend, Vladislav Adamski. Alexander appoints Gabrielle her chaperone. Vlad, who no longer competes due to porphyria, hypnotizes Carmilla, "Think only of your game...say you'll trust and obey me." Carmilla, "I do. I will." Gabrielle quips, "Sounds more like a cult than an athletic program." In Belgrade, Hector checks Stash's mail; "Old-fashioned views require old-fashioned remedies." Stash, "Very cryptic." Hector triggers a pressure bomb. Gabrielle worries about Vlad's "people." Peter, "Have you been reading Stephen King again?" Peter helps Hector disarm the bomb. Wondering about Vlad's "ailment" and behavior, Gabrielle suspects he killed Trevin to get to Carmilla. Peter scoffs, "Vlad had garlic with his pasta." Hector jokes, "nice veins on your neck." Gabrielle dreams of vampires. Finding blood bags, she takes a sample. Hélène finds Vlad's protégé Jimmy Talbot (Note: Daniel MacIvor as Talbot) in Boston, who tells Peter, "Vlad is a blood doper," breaking ITF rules. Worse, Jimmy contracted porphyria through unscreened transfusions. Analysis reveals the sample is HIV-positive. They rush to prevent Carmilla's transfusion. Note: The episode ends with a USA Network sports reporter, introduced by Peter Sinclair as Linda Pence (uncredited), who interviews Alexander Addington about Carmilla's US Open tennis match.
35	13	"Village of the Damned"	Allan Eastman	Ian Sutherland	December 14, 1991
In Coboconk, Ontario, biologist Dr. Joseph Severn, (Note: Bernard Behrens as Dr. Severn) head of Gaia Research experimental organic farming for the World Food Organization, radios Toronto asking who sent Parathion broad-spectrum liquid pesticide. A crop duster sprays him, causing paranoiac delusions. J.J. lands at Sanders Falls, seventy miles from the farm. Pete hits a roadblock; they walk the rest of the way. A paramilitary goon radios, "We have visitors!" Hélène discovers Severn's assistant Dr. Karl Luttke (Note: Daniel Kash as Luttke) ordered the pesticides. The team finds a murder-suicide. A frightened boy runs. J.J. asks MacIntosh who rigged his Tiger Moth to dust crops. MacIntosh says Luttke flew supplies to the farm. Hélène learns Luttke died two years prior. Hector is captured. A Latina tells Gabrielle, a plane dusted the workers, who ran, screaming, fighting, killing. Armed men hold their children hostage. Military Intelligence Colonel Jacks tells Alexander, Luttke is an imposter who helped Saddam Hussein develop nerve gas, and bonded synthetic hallucinogens to pesticides, causing homicidal madness. The boy gives his BB rifle to Hector, who uses it to escape with Severn and free the hostages. Gabrielle takes them to safety, while Peter, Hector and J.J. go after Luttke and his men.
36	14	"Prize Package"	Jorge Montesi	Richard Oleksiak, Tony DiFranco	January 4, 1992
News from Iraq, tear gas from the ceiling...they shoot Halloway (Note: Barry Flatman as Halloway) and abduct Ashti. U.S. State Department agent Clark Reynolds calls Alexander, "We've lost a package." Peter Alden provides details. Traditional Sunni Iraqi, Ashti Tabis was abducted. Her husband, mastermind of Saddam's nuclear weapons program, was killed for refusing to launch a Scud dirty bomb on Tel Aviv. Ashti memorized his enrichment and launch sites. Peter meets Halloway, who shot a kidnapper; Palestinian terrorist from Black September. Bennett discovers his travel plan. Peter and Hector find Iraqi Republican Guard colonel Omar Latif holding Ashti at gunpoint. In the standoff, Latif kills Halloway, throws Ashti aside, and flees. Gabrielle preps Ashti for General Powell's press conference near Camp David. Another terrorist (Note: Sugith Varughese as Terrorist) hands a diplomatic pouch to Latif, "Today our hatred will be realized." Ashti triggers Reynolds' metal detector. She claims her broken arm has a steel rod. J.J. receives an Interpol fax for Peter. Ashti breaks her cast and removes a needle. Peter phones Gabrielle; Ashti is an imposter...who activates a sub-dermal homing beacon. J.J. drives the team to Latif, who deploys a guided missile launcher. Gabrielle must isolate the imposter. Peter and Hector must capture Latif and stop the countdown.
37	15	"The Three Tramps"	William Fruet	Richard Oleksiak, Tony DiFranco	January 11, 1992
In Wilkes-Barre, Pennsylvania, Lenny (Note: Frank Moore as Lenny) mails his parcel. Billy, (Note: Chris Potter as Billy) "Everything OK?" Carol assures her cop boyfriend, "Last customer." Billy is called away. Lenny's receipt is taken...before he can eat it... Adam Haight presents his thesis. "Detailed, but inaccurate," Hélène observes. Gabrielle shows Lenny's parcel to Alexander...headline, "Three Tramps Apprehended." Suspects in the Kennedy assassination include Buddy Lightstone, (Note: Walker Boone as Buddy) imprisoned at Attica. Al Sostre, (Note: Clark Johnson as Sostre) "how much information is in this package?" Caller, "Too much." Sostre marks the photo...only one tramp left... Gabrielle interrupts men tossing her flat for Lenny's package. Hector and Peter rescue her. An inmate tells Buddy, "check page 53" of Target: JFK. "Lenny's Dead. Call Immediately." Buddy reminds Sostre, "We got a deal. I keep my mouth shut, you keep me alive...You're the fixer!" The team investigates, but every lead is a dead-end; Coroner, Warden, Buddy's daughter Jenny, and the third tramp killed before the Warren Commission results. Promising a story, Sostre lures Gabrielle away. Buddy denies involvement. Peter and Hector locate Gabrielle. Sostre shoots Buddy while escaping, flashing his badge at them. Gabrielle says she's not giving up on the truth. "Wish you luck," Sostre replies. Addington concludes "some events in history...are meant to haunt us forever."
38	16	"Behind Bars"	Bruno Gantillon	Elizabeth Baxter	March 14, 1992
In Izmir Turkey archaeologist Dr. Hans Klein "finally found the eighth wonder of the world..." a belly dancer, Gabrielle observes with her friend Helga. Returning home, customs finds rare gold coins in Gabrielle's purse. She's placed behind bars in a Turkish prison for smuggling. The prison guard (Note: Nadia Vasil as the Prison Guard) prohibits Gabrielle's phone calls. Sirma (Note: Annie Mercier as Sirma) says she'll "have to earn the right...learn how to please me." To Peter, Foreign Minister Liaison Guchlo (Note: Waguih Takla as Guchlo) suggests Gabrielle smuggled for Alexander. French Consul Maurice Bizet estimates two months before a bail hearing. Hector "bumps into" Sait (Note: Patrick Serraf as Sait) to probe prison security. Asked if Helga planted the coins, Gabrielle can't believe it, but Peter receives Helga's Interpol rap-sheet. In Munich, Alexander poses as a customer to obtain demareteions from Helga, who calls Mr. Mu'adi...with Peter and Officer Frida (Note: Alexandra Ehrlich as Frida) listening in. Sait, "Only 6 women have escaped...." Hector, "How?" But Peter is adamant about legal release. They arrest Mu'adi; Stone poses in his place to catch Helga. Alexander pushes for Gabrielle's release, but Guchlo cites bureaucracy. They leverage Guchlo at a massage parlor and hatch a scheme. Gabrielle, apparently, O.D.'s on pills she bought from Sirma. Guchlo pronounces Gabrielle dead; Hector and Peter must now get her passed Sait.
39	17	"Cherchez la Femme"	Jean-Pierre Prévost	Jean-Vincent Fournier	March 21, 1992
Peter gets acquainted with the beautiful but dangerous Noelle (Note: Alexandra Vandernoot as Noelle) after a swim. In London, Scotland Yard Inspector Coleridge calls Winston Dexter a "cheap bounty hunter in an even cheaper suit." Dexter says Paris is where he'll find the woman. Klaus in Geneva suspects money laundering at Alexander's bank. After the BCCI scandal, he insists everything be "above board." The team investigates. Noelle is alarmed when she learns Peter is a cop. He wakes to find her gone, and the flat owner disputes, her name isn't Noelle Bonnier, but rather Claudette Laurence. Peter checks Noelle's wine glass for prints. Coleridge is alerted; they match Mrs. Anna Hargrove-Grade, wanted for murdering her husband. Gabrielle insists on helping Peter; Anna "married three times, to men a lot richer and older and they're dead now." Also wanted for jewel theft, £3,000,000, Coleridge says; insurance investigator is "a man called Dexter." Peter has Hector tap Dexter's phone. Anna meets a jeweler to sell them...but he calls Dexter. Peter finds the jeweler dead, and Dexter there...looking for Anna. Peter finds Anna who claims the murder happened after she left. Dexter arrives with a gun. Hector and Gabrielle follow Peter's locator to prevent their murders.
40	18	"Dead Heat"	Jean-Pierre Prévost	Marc Eisenchteter	April 4, 1992
Alexander worries over Muhammad Aziz and Howard Golding "shaking up the Middle East" ...and his fundraiser event. At the airport, the assassin garrotes Saudi Arabian Jamal Nayyar, taking his ghutrah as a disguise, and his keycard for entry. For the event, Stone sees to security, while Gabrielle and Peter dress for the occasion. At Longchamps Racetrack, Gabrielle greets Aziz and Golding, introducing them to Madame Martin, founder and president of the Animal Rights Foundation. Meanwhile, the assassin changes garb again...donning pantyhose. Madame Martin and Gabrielle chat with journalist Pia Grazini, while Stone monitors video in the security booth. He gives Pierre a security test for Peter, then sends Peter to the front gate. Philippe Evran tells Peter about Nayyar's murdered at the airport; the M.O. points to a hit-man known only as The Fisherman. Just as Pierre discovers when the assassin changed disguise, the killer changes garb again, now disguised as a waiter. Hector and Peter find the waiter's body, and Gabrielle is alerted to keep an eye on Alexander in the dining room. She manages to prevent the hit, but the Fisherman flees. Hector and Peter give chase to catch the assassin.
41	19	"La Belle Dame Monique"	Dennis Berry	Martin Brossollet	April 11, 1992
Monique complains, "You're late Dumont." He explains, "I had to be sure I was not followed." The sniper shoots him. Monique returns fire and escapes with his briefcase. Dumont (Note: Charles Millot as Dumont) is captured as their "only lead." Monique and Hector examine new EEC currency, wondering if it's fake. With her informant Dumont compromised, Monique needs someone with integrity; Addington. Derek Wolf, aka The Grey Wolf, (Note: Yves Beneyton as the Thin Man) tortures Dumont uselessly; his henchman kills Dumont. "Stay at Dumont's place...I want to know who comes and goes...the girl has the sample." Gabrielle asks why Dumont is called "The Ink Well". Monique explains he could copy any ink, even its smell. Fearing devastation of the European economy, Addington agrees to lend Europol agent Monique his Counterstrike Team. In Brussels, Valerie takes Gabrielle and Peter to meet Mr. Andersen to acquire genuine bills. At Dumont's home, Monique and Hector exchange gunfire with Derek's men. Analyzing bills, Hélène discovers the difference. They must now find who leaked the originals. Stone recognizes Derek; Monique knows Derek employed forger Bosco Germain. In Liège, Belgium they pressure Bosco and tap his prison communications. Valerie tips Derek where Gabrielle and Andersen are; they're abducted. Hector, Peter and Monique rush to their rescue.
42	20	"Ripped from the Grave"	Bruno Gantillon	Elizabeth Baxter	April 18, 1992
Gabrielle meets her boyfriend Stefan Von Bridov at a reception for Romanian Ambassador Jerzy Arpad, celebrating freedom from Communism. Jerzy introduces his security chief, Colonel Nastig. After an evening together, Stefan is murdered. Police Inspector Philippe questions Gabrielle. He tells Peter, organs were surgically removed, placed in an arc around the body. Peter recognizes the MO; Jack the Ripper. Peter checks who accessed Scotland Yard's records; Hector checks with his biker contacts. Gabrielle questions Jerzy about Stefan, while Peter heads to Prague on an Interpol lead from Ms. Sokova. Nastig tails Gabrielle, but she evades him...then investigates his background. Jerzy's assistant and lover Carla comments, "It's strange that Leon's in town so soon after Stefan's death." The team learns two men were murdered in Berlin similarly to the man in Prague, four total. The Ripper stopped after six, only two left. The fifth is a woman this time, Carla. Hector convinces Philippe to work together. British Intelligence Colonel Jacks tells Alexander, they were all KGB agents tied to the Romanian embassy, including Carla Firenzi, and there's a seventh. Gabrielle phones Jerzy, "I know about the seven men." She sets a meeting...Nastig listens in...her trap is set, but for who?
43	21	"Trigger Finger"	Daniel Moosmann	Tony DiFranco, Richard Oleksiak	May 2, 1992
The prison bus transporting Xenoff Pechkoff is ambushed. Yuri (Note: Michel Subor as Yuri) tells Alexander that Pechkoff has first claim to the Moldavian throne, and he fears for the life of President Burballis. Alexander, fearing a coup will put tactical nuclear weapons into the wrong hands, tasks his team to thwart the plot. Major Franko intends to set up "Corporal" Pechkoff as a puppet king, and tasks Nikoff with preparing a televised announcement from Pechkoff to the people, and moving into position to commander Moldavia's nuclear arsenal. To infiltrate Franko's group, Stone talks to his contact Max who says, "His friends call him 'Roach'." Hector and Gabrielle surveil Roach, François and others at a pub, taking photos. Peter has Gabrielle protect Burballis while he monitors the group's movements via Stone's locator. Stone incapacitates Roach to take his place in Franco's cabal. Franco, planning to kill Stone after he assassinates President Burballis, gets him into position. Stone takes the shot, and then points the rifle at Franko. Gabrielle takes off her disguise and her bulletproof coat, while law enforcement close in to arrest Pechkoff and Nikoff.
44	22	"The Circus Ring"	Robin Davis	Fabrice Ziolkowski	May 9, 1992
A motorcycle policeman chases a reckless Apex van driver, who crashes, drowning himself and three teenagers who had been heavily sedated. James (Note: Ross Petty as James) asks Alexander, "Can you imagine hitchhiking through Europe at 17?" His daughter Catherine and her boyfriend were among the dead, along with another teenage girl, Francine. Antoine protests, "It's getting too risky!" Burroughs warns, "There's only one way out. Replace them...deliver the merchandise and we're off the hook." Burroughs kills the owner of Apex Van Rentals to cover his tracks. On the way to Marseille, Gabrielle discovers a pattern in the Apex routes. Meanwhile, Burroughs picks up another hitchhiking girl. Peter finds a torn ticket in Catherine's belongings. Antoine fails to lure Beatrice away; she runs, screaming for help. Helene finds a traveling circus, Cirque Diana Moreno & Gerard Bormann. Peter buys tickets...they match. Burroughs drugs the hitchhiker and goes hunting for more girls in the audience. Hector and Gabrielle infiltrate the circus as carnies to thwart the kidnapping ring. Peter gets a description of Antoine from Beatrice. In the middle of Gabrielle's disappearing act, Burroughs and Antoine lure two girls away from the big tent. Hector and Peter chase them to recover the girls.

=== Season 3 (1992–93) ===
No. overall	No. in season	Title	Directed by	Written by	Original release date
45	1	"I Remember It Well"	Robin Davis	Jean-Vincent Fournier	September 26, 1992
Monitoring, Jean-Jacques Truffaut (Note: Jean-Pierre Aumont as Jean-Jacques Truffaut) warns, "On your right...watch the stairs." The jewel thief fires the crossbow line. Inspector Matté suspects the Vronsky jewel thief is on Alexander's payroll. All clues implicate Nicole Beaumont. Alexander protests, the thief "Nikki" no longer exists; she's now La Comtesse Chevalier. Peter confirms, "She's rich, she's married, and she's reformed." Peter visits Nikki. Matté allowed 48 hours to prove her innocence; she gives Peter 48 seconds to leave. Gabrielle tails Nikki. Hector monitors her calls. Godard's goons, "We never thought they'd jump the gun." Goddard, "Tricked by an old man and a girl?" Goddard wants those jewels! Gabrielle follows Nikki to Nice. Hector discovers, "a local capo hired an old pro for the heist...but was double crossed." Nikki shakes Gabrielle, but she has an idea. Peter visits Mr. Chevalier, who is evasive. Gabrielle finds Nikki; so do Godard's goons...at gunpoint. Hector locates jewelers who forge duplicates. Gabrielle and Nikki break their bonds and escape. Nikki visits her jewel thief mentor...Papa! Truffaut admits, "It was irresistible." Goddard and goons arrive, threatening to kill Nikki if Truffaut doesn't hand over the jewels. Hector arrives and frees the women. Peter tracks Goddard and rescues Truffaut.
46	2	"The Sting"	René Bonnière	Richard Oleksiak	October 3, 1992
Spike and two punk thugs wreck the shop, threatening, "Di Marco wants his francs...and fast." At Suzanne Addington's (Note: Rachel Palmieri as Suzanne Addington) party, Alexander is the one surprised for his birthday by friend and restaurateur Henri. Luigi Di Marco (Note: Philippe Caroit as Di Marco) warns Spike, "Make the rest of the collection." Spike roughs up Henri. Alexander and Hélène witness as Spike leaves. The Police Commissioner tells Alexander the mafia hired the Purple Gang, led by Carlo Rosti (Note: Jean-Pierre Bernard as Rosti) to run their protection racket. As witness, Addington is now a target. Spike threatens Henri again...and his wife Marion...and his daughter, forcing him to call Alexander to the restaurant...in code.... Spike threatens Alexander. Peter and J.J. apprehend Spike. Disguised as punk rockers, Gabrielle and Hector con Di Marco...there's a new boss in town. Di Marco goes to intimidate Henri, but finds Sinclair instead. He threatens Sinclair, but Stone threatens back. Peter declares, "I already have protection. Tell that to your boss!" Rosti wants "to see the guy who thinks he can muscle" him. At the restaurant, Rosti is surprised to see Addington. Rosti's henchmen try to blow up the restaurant, but Stone and the team is ready for them.
47	3	"Till Death Do Us Part"	Bruno Gantillon	Michael Leo Donovan	October 10, 1992
Alexander receives a videotape of his kidnapped wife, Chantal, demanding a million-dollar ransom. At the meeting place, the inspector and the team observe. A woman tells Peter and Alexander to get in; they drive off. Gabrielle and Hector follow Alexander's locator and deal with a decoy car. Sinclair's old nemesis Trevor Winston shows Alexander his wife behind a glass cage, claiming she has amnesia after the shock of the kidnapping. Stone arrives, shoots the glass, but it's a hologram. Winston doubles the ransom. Corinne runs the woman's prints for Peter. Winston sets a second meet and gets the money. Gabrielle and Hector follow him to a farm house, and must split up to follow them both, but the woman's car is a ruse. Hector is trapped in the box truck, which Winston sends into the river. Gabrielle catches up to him, but cannot break the lock. The prints come back; a con-woman named Juliette Leclair. (Note: Barbara Law as Juliette) Stone manages to extricate himself through a trapdoor. The team tracks Trevor and Juliette to the train station. Gab catches Juliette aka "Chantal" with the money. Winston takes a hostage at gunpoint, forcing a stand-off with Sinclair.
48	4	"Bastille Day Terror"	Bruno Gantillon	Tony DiFranco	October 17, 1992
At Svetogorsk, sexy Monika Steile (Note: Brigitte Nielsen as Monika Steile) distracts border guards...who she shoots. Clark Reynolds from Washington interrupts Alexander's Bastille Day parade planning...a Russian SDR-16 half-megaton nuclear missile was stolen. Monika, "That missile's going to make us rich, Mikhail!" At Narcisse cabaret, Peter braves Jessica Toulin's burlesque-biker rehearsal, "Who's in the market for Soviet arms?" Grudgingly, she lists names. Monika and Jacques Baire (Note: Bradley Cole as Baire) get down to business. Owing Hector his life, Gorbachev's computer expert Anton hacks the Stroika Arsenal, finding inventory clerk Mikhail Gorki. Hector pressures the delivery guy, who names Baire. They arrive too late. Gabriella redraws clues to the meeting. Baire pays $750,000 and a flattering remark to Monika, angering Mikhail, who draws a gun. Monika shoots Mikhail, "I warned him to keep it in his pants." She kills Baire too, "I don't need no middle man." Finding bodies, Philippe Evran issues an APB. Monika phones, "Angel, we got the money and the missile!" Peter's "raven" tips him to the Blue Note; he's ambushed. In disguise, Gabriella enters Monika's flat, locating her boat. Hector's gal reveals Monika's girlfriend, "has a show called Jessica Rides Bare Metal." Both are ex-KGB "Ravens." Hector rescues Peter, but triggers the launch...30 seconds to ignition....
49	5	"No Honour Among Thieves"	Jean-Pierre Prévost	Martin Lager	October 24, 1992
At Orly Airport, Anita Duvalier (Note: Elke Sommer as Anita Duvalier) and half-brother Morey "the Brain" Lempke (Note: Val Avery as Morey Lempke) arrive. Press questions his Mafia connections, and Israel denying his residency. His bodyguard Jimmy Gato is murdered, with a pigeon shoved in his mouth. Anita asks her old flame Alexander for help. The Mafia heard a rumor; Lempke will testify to the U.S. Senate Committee on Organized Crime. Lempke, "It's a lie." Gabrielle researches known Mafiosi associates, including Salvatore Castigliano. Since Lempke worked against Castro, her Cuban exile contact names CIA Agent Parry Traherne. (Note: Christian Erickson as Traherne) The waiter delivers the meal...cold...it's a bomb! Stone manages to save them. They move Lempke to a safe-house. Traherne tells Peter, "you're barking up the wrong tree." Stone asks a favor from hooker Jeanette; (Note: Nadia Farès as Jeanette) an introduction to "Mr. C" in Nice. Sinclair convinces him, "You're being set up." Castigliano, "I'm listening." Alexander informs Lempke, the French denied him residency...you have to leave...now. Hector and Gabrielle fend off an attack on the safe-house. Peter confronts Traherne, "Sal's called off the hit...you started the rumor...Lempke is returning to the U.S. to testify...to the Congressional Committee on Covert Activities...Cuba, Dallas, Iran...you're personal involvement with the mob. It's a matter of honor."
50	6	"Skin Deep"	Robin Davis	Vincent Lambert	October 31, 1992
After the voodoo dance performance, Hélène's comments on Suzanne's new investment...fashions by Sandrine Carter. (Note: Latoya Jackson as Sandrine Carter) And star model Lucine? "She's finished." ...in a body bag. Serge Pasquier photographs Gabrielle and flirts, but she "prefers honesty, period." Inspector Evran tells Peter, "ablation of the heart...still alive when her heart was cut out...traces of nerve toxin," possibly Caribbean blowfish venom from Haiti. Serge shoots Tara at an auto-junkyard, abusively, but she loves it. Peter questions Sandrine about the murder. Evidently Tara hated Lucine. Sandrine sees Gabrielle's photo in Serge's darkroom, and rips it. Gabrielle interviews Sandrine; obsessed with youth and beauty, Sandrine runs computer projections of Gabrielle's appearance in 15 years...20...at 70 years-old. Tara is found murdered, same as Lucine. Stone learns Serge beats women, and has a beautiful older sister. Arrested, Serge appears to be under a spell. He jumps out a window to his death. Gabrielle confronts Sandrine with the truth. "Do you really want to know the truth, Ms. Germont?" Sandrine blows dust, paralyzing Gabrielle. Peter goes through Serge's photos, back to 1960; not a brother, but a son? Peter and Hector rush to rescue Gabrielle, before she becomes the next murdered beauty.
51	7	"The Curse of the Amber Chamber"	Jorge Montesi	Jean-Vincent Fournier	November 7, 1992
In the Black Forest, at Addington Mining & Mineral Research, Moscow Institute's archaeology professor, Natasha Keirov tells Hans, "I want results, not arguments." Addington assures President Yeltzin, "If the Amber Chamber is there, we'll help you get it out." Hélène explains, it was commissioned by King Frederick I of Prussia in 1701 for the Russian Royal Family, and stolen from Saint Petersburg by Germans in WWII. Deputy Mayor assistant Herr Hinkel (Note: Marc de Jonge as Herr Hinkel) warns Natasha, the caves are dangerous. Someone sabotages a truck, nearly hitting Peter and Natasha. A cave-in traps Gabrielle and Peter; he finds evidence of explosives. Hector calls Bennett for help, but Hinkel says "I'll be too late," aiming his Luger. Gabrielle spots a rat and follows it to better air...and a WWII German bunker with a diary. Hinkel reveals, his father hid the chamber from the Russian government. Gabrielle and Peter find the chamber and its treasure. Hinkel admits to the cave-in. Hector gets his gun, but Natasha shoots Hinkel, admitting to driving off the workers to take the treasure for herself. She grabs for treasure, setting off another cave-in. The team escapes; Natasha, Hans and Hinkel do not.
52	8	"Death SEAL"	Allan Eastman	Fabrice Ziolkowski	November 14, 1992
At Laurel Canyon, Peter's date Mary Jane wonders about his secretive life...Hector's date is an aerobics instructor on television. WNN anchor Clint Williams reports a Newfoundland 707 crash. Eight Navy SEALs from Squad 7 killed by Red Strike terrorists. Defense Department spokesman Colonel Jack Devon (Note: Gordon Pinsent as Jack Devon) adds, "They're off-shoots of Black November." Hector gathers his gear to investigate his buddies' deaths. In Washington, Hector comforts Brad's widow Cindy, (Note: Ellen Dubin as Cindy) and pressures Red Strike operations officer Silas Purell. The flight was from a top secret German nuclear base....a sniper kills Silas. A fiver reads, "Stone Keep out of this!" At the crash site, Peter and Gabrielle find decontamination units burying the radioactive plane. Stone confronts Devon, "Who blew up the plane and why?" Devon alerts MPs who shoot Stone, wounding his arm. SEAL buddy Bull (Note: Richard Eden as Bull) cautions, "You should've taken the hint...last warning." Bull helps him escape. Devon orders Bull, "Get to Stone before they do. Lieutenant Bellows is our Washington contact." Peter consults the police Lieutenant. Gabrielle interviews Devon, and point-blank asks about contamination. Devon, "I prefer not to speculate." Devon orders Bull to tail her. Gabrielle tries to help Hector. Bull, Stone and Devon have a showdown.
53	9	"Cyborg"	William Fruet	Richard Oleksiak	November 21, 1992
At Crestline Research, Connecticut, security guard Leonard admires pretty Moya (Note: Lisa Howard as Moya / Ari) in the lab, practicing at being a good housewife. Genetic scientist Dr. Arno (Note: David Fox as Arno) makes a house call, "They found Klaus...if that bastard talks we're ruined." Moya offers to help....the guards are killed...and Arno! Gabrielle visits Ari, who can sense her twin sister Moya. She wants the experimentation ended. Inspector Campbell (Note: Jank Azman as Inspector Campbell) tells Sinclair, the victims were pulverized. Moya learns from WNN anchor Clint Williams, that Senator Deacon will receive Klaus Reichmann's (Note: David Hemblen as Klaus Reichmann) congressional testimony, as head of East Germany's secret scientific research. Skip flirts with Moya. "Skip, do you have a car?" After a kiss, Moya tosses Skip like a rag-doll, and tries to take Ari away, insisting, "We have to kill Klaus." Ari tries dissuading Moya, suggesting Gabrielle can help. Stone presses Crestline administrator Noel Astridge (Note: Robert Bockstael as Astridge) that Arno worked for the KGB and the Stasi. Astridge admits, Arno genetically "augmented Moya's arousal with heightened aggression. She's the perfect killing machine." Gabrielle gets Ari to stop Moya, but Moya is posing as Ari. They meet Klaus at the airport. Ari arrives to stop Moya, but Moya pretends to be Ari. The team must determine who is who.
54	10	"D.O.A."	Allan Eastman	John Sheppard	December 5, 1992
In New York City, they rush Peter to the hospital...uncertain if he'll be D.O.A.. The team speculates whether Libyan terrorist Azwan Hassif (Note: Damon D'Oliveira as Hassif) was involved. Stone questions Traeger (Note: Tom Butler as Traeger) for more information. The news reporter updates the death toll at 215 passengers in the bombing of flight 109 over Scotland. Dorit (Note: Guylaine St-Onge as Dorit) tells Dr. Stanley Ladner, (Note: Hrant Alianak as Ladner) "They're all so predictable." Peter receives a recording, "Welcome to the last day of your life." The poison is fatal within 24 hours. She demands, "Your life for the traitor Aligendy, before he can testify against Hassif." Dr. Menges (Note: Geoffrey Bowes as Dr. Menges) explains the poison mutates too quickly...only its creator can counter it. Gabrielle interviews Hassif in prison, in vain. Peter finds a photo of the woman responsible. Ladner gives Dorit the antidote. Peter collapses and confronts his dark emotional subconscious. Hector and Gabrielle plead with a hospital clerk (Note: Anais Granofsky as Hospital Clerk) to see Dorit. Instead, they find, Ladner; an anti-war activist, hippie, radical professor, award-winning chemist, genius in his field...dead in the freezer. Dorit calls to set up the exchange. Stone takes Traeger at gunpoint to get Aligendy to trade for the antidote. Hector and Dorit vie for control in a life or death stand-off.
55	11	"Cat in the Cradle"	Alan Simmonds	Stephen Alix	December 11, 1992
At El Gato strip club, Philadelphia, Sam Percy asks John McGill (Note: Tony De Santis as John McGill) to pay his father Frank's IOU for $25,000. But McGill denies him. Sam, "My father kept records...on everything." McGill, "It's bad luck he got killed." Louis Galado (Note: Joel Wyner as Louis Galado) asks, "You got problems?" John, "Kid's just like his old man...accident prone." Lou sends Ronnie and Jack to kill him...Sam escapes on his enduro. He shows Hector his father's DEA reports...McGill was Frank's informant. They wait for Sam's mother; Hector drops Jack, but Ronnie threatens Kathleen at gunpoint. Sam triggers the alarm, scaring them away. Hector calls Peter for backup. Gabrielle's research reveals Galado has syndicate connections, and McGill imports cocaine. Lou, "What's he got on you?" McGill, "Frank found out what I was doing in Columbia." Gabrielle interviews at El Gato to supply girls, showing Lou a portfolio. J.J. chats with barmaid Marlene (Note: Mary Beth Rubens as Marlene) while keeping watch for Gabrielle. Sinclair offers to help DEA Agent Jacobson arrest the drug-smugglers. Columbian cocaine kingpin Salinas and heroin trader Gazeppi meet at El Gato. Peter gives the signal, and they move on them. Gabrielle reveals her portfolio bugged Lou's office, supplying sufficient evidence. Hector draws out Ronnie and Jack to be arrested in flagrante delicto.
56	12	"Bosnian Connection"	Alan Simmonds	Elizabeth Baxter	December 20, 1992
Under sniper fire, Brigitte Arnell tells Jovan, she needs to leave to discover why her Bosnian First Line Charities trucks aren't getting aid through. Addington is alarmed when Brigitte goes missing. Gabrielle investigates the New York branch, led by Mark Holtman. Pete meets with Joval, while Hector goes undercover as a dock worker. He notices the guard's arm-patch, which is painted onto a supply truck. Hélène discovers it represents VAS, a fascist Bosnian splinter-group. Gabrielle wants to verify Mr. Booker's sources to counter his news exposé from damaging First Line's reputation. Hector accompanies a shipment with a tracker; Peter follows. Joval and VAS soldiers abduct Peter, taking his phone and scanner. Booker tells Gabrielle, with Brigitte gone there's wide-scale skimming and profiteering; she breaks into the files. Hector finds Jovan, holding Peter and Brigitte captive. Gabrielle notices Mark noticing the VAS insignia, "Jovan came with the territory." Jovan tells Pavle that Peter can't be alone; they torture Peter to reveal who's helping him. Hector takes up arms and fights back to free Peter. Hélène warns Gabrielle, someone in America is profiting; she sees Mark outside watching her. Alone, Gabrielle must utilize her self-defense training against Mark.
57	13	"Betrayed"	René Bonnière	Tony DiFranco	January 9, 1993
Outside Bigliardi's, Toronto, publishing magnate Julia Devane (Note: Sonja Smits as Julia Devane) reaches for her glove, just as the sniper shoots. Alexander chides, "you were getting death threats?" Gabrielle calls her arrogant, manipulative, ruthless, "I don't like 'the lady', OK?" Hector, "Sour grapes?" Peter bolsters Julie's security, Stone gathers street intelligence, Gabrielle researches Devane's files. Barmaid Brenda (Note: Nahanni Johnstone as Barmaid) serves Eddie Grant beer, and coffee to the man with the cash...Eddie grabs the cash. The police detective shows Hector the crime scene. "A Dragunov? How'd he miss?" Stone suspects a setup. Cash-guy is revealed; Devane's lawyer Sam Leaver. Gun shop owner Chuckie gives Hector customer video. For access to Devane's files, Gabrielle pretends to have a story for Stan Moore. (Note: David Eisner as Stan Moore) Stan wants to cut parts alleging "Devane and the Securities Commission chairman were involved," and her "thugs terrorized corporate competition in Mexico." At her house, Peter and Julie get intimately acquainted. Hector shows Brenda a 7.62×54mmR. Add "attempted murder...to your rap sheet?" She admits buying for Eddie. Gabrielle discovers Devane is planning a hostile takeover of Addington Publishing. Alexander, "double-dealing shrew!" Hector and Peter find Eddie....dead. Peter confronts Julie, hinting Brenda talked about Eddie's "jobs". Sam, listening, goes after Brenda...Hector's ready for him.
58	14	"Clear Cut"	Donald Shebib	Jean-Vincent Fournier	February 7, 1993
In the logging town of Manlow, Maine, White Waters Conversationalists founder Ron Waters (Note: Alex Carter as Ron) finds an owl nailed to a tree with a sign: "Tell Addington if he wants to protect spotted owls, plant this one!" Governor Jim Donnely (Note: Michael J. Reynolds as Gov. Donnely) calls, unhappy that the Addington-brokered truce is broken. Newswoman Kathy interviews Waters about accusations. Peter and Hector meet Sheriff Jack Kimberley to investigate. For his mother, Johnny (Note: Dean McDermott as Johnny) needs an experimental breast cancer medicine from Clint Howser; "$600 a gram...got a job for you first." Gabrielle wants to interview Ron, but his girlfriend Susan Kimberley (Note: Torri Higginson as Susan) doesn't want him talking to Addington employees. Chain-sawing a spiked tree maims a logger's arm. Peter wonders why Waters would sabotage the treaty. Gabrielle photographs yew trees stripped of bark. Clint gives Mrs. Stratton the medicine, in exchange for Johnny hauling bark. Peter fields Kathy's questions; loggers protest, "Save jobs, not birds." Clint bombs the loggers' trailer. Peter questions Ron, who believes he's being set up. Hector finds Clint on Kathy's video. Clint abducts Gabrielle and plants the detonator in Ron's office. Ron investigates the yew stands, and tries to stop Johnny. Hector follows Gabrielle's locator, to stop Clint from killing her.
59	15	"Free to Kill"	Jean-Pierre Prévost	Tony DiFranco	February 14, 1993
In Detroit, Michigan the serial killer purposefully wakes Jack Morrison...to kill him. Mrs. Morrison spots him leaving. Psychiatrist Dr. Sharon Rayne (Note: Mimi Kuzyk as Dr. Sharon Rayne) calls Alexander, "I'm afraid you might be next." Alexander and Jack served on the same parole board three years prior. Hector tracks down eight ex-con suspects. Gabrielle talks to Mrs. Morrison. The detective (Note: Philip Akin as The Detective) runs Peter through the crime scene, finding a postcard; "The phoenix has risen." Sharon also received one, sent by Charles Renfrew. (Note: Shawn Thompson as Renfrew) But Hector reports Renfrew dead, the same day another board member died. The coroner points Hector to the dentist, "these aren't Renfrew's records." Sharon tells Peter about the missing girls Renfrew was suspected of killing. Cellmate Hank Holstrom tells Stone about Renfrew's "mystical new age pen-pal" Joanie Simpson, (Note: Robyn Stevan as Joanie) but Gabrielle doesn't get much from her. Joanie tells Charles about Gabrielle. Renfrew manipulates "Tiny" to kill about Holstrom for revealing Joanie. Addington, wearing a bulletproof vest, eulogizes Morrison to draw out Renfrew, but it's Joanie who has the gun. Gabrielle and Hector disarm her. Al doesn't spot Renfrew in Sharon's car...Renfrew takes her where he took the other girls. The team drill Joanie to locate Renfrew before he can kill Sharon.
60	16	"The Hit"	William Fruet	Jean-Vincent Fournier	February 28, 1993
At Lake Napawan, Peter and Yvonne Strait (Note: Cali Timmins as Yvonne) share a stormy night. Two men break in and beat Peter senseless. Alexander alerts the team he's missing, presumed drowned in a boating accident. Suspicious, Sheriff Ray Jenkins tells Yvonne, Peter's "pretty damn connected...Justice Department, FBI, Interpol..." They don't "believe in accidents." Yvonne insists he left on his own. Gabrielle and Hector talk to the Sheriff and to Yvonne. To meet their boss in Canada, Xavier and Vince (Note: Réal Andrews as Vince) say they'll kill the customs official (Note: Christian Laurin as Customs Official) if Peter can't talk them past the checkpoint. Hector finds Peter's prized watch and gets suspicious of Yvonne. They learn Yvonne's Atlantic City gambling debts were paid by Trevor Winston. Alexander calls Scotland Yard; he "thought that bastard was still in jail," (after events in "Till Death Do Us Part"). Winston has Yvonne abducted. Gabrielle and Hector try to follow her movements. Using Yvonne as leverage, Winston warns Peter he'll torture her if he doesn't divulge the whereabouts of Carlos Sarento; drug lords Salinas and Gazeppi want to silence Sarento's testimony. J.J. gets info on local flights. The team zeroes-in to rescue Peter and Yvonne.
61	17	"French Twist"	Jean-Pierre Prévost	Richard Oleksiak	March 21, 1993
Quinton Jones (Note: Nigel Bennett as Quinton) has a real story for Gabrielle, "full of crime, corruption and duplicity." Gallery 473 owner Eve Jeffries (Note: Roberta Bizeau as Eve) orders Gabrielle Champaign...drugged. Three shots and Gabrielle wakes...Detective Malecki (Note: Booth Savage as Malecki) wants her statement. The New York Times reads "Quinton Jones Dies in Fiery Crash," from a gas tank explosion. Stone recognizes a phosphorus accelerator in the wreckage. Gabrielle's toxicology results are inconclusive. Eve tells Nicky, (Note: Juan Chioran as Nicky) "business before pleasure." She wants his commission. Frenchie and his secretary (Note: Leslie Kay Sterling as Frenchie's secretary) count .357s and Berettas as Stone inquires after incendiary grenades. Eve tells Peter, Gabrielle was sick that night, and Quinton took her home. Gabrielle remembers gunfire. Peter, "Who was shooting?" Gabrielle, "I think I was." Hélène and Alexander suspect "scopolamine...soluble in alcohol." Gabrielle and Hector look for club Cyco-Deli. Malecki tells Sinclair, a Quinton painting was signed over to Gabrielle, and the gun that killed him found with her prints. Thugs assail Hector; Gabrielle goes missing. The art appraiser (Note: Louis Negin as Art Appraiser) concludes, "It's definitely not a Quinton Jones...very good fake." Malecki spots Eve. He and Peter tail her. While questioning Gabrielle, Eve shoots Nicky. Gabrielle goes for Nicky's gun as Eve trains hers at Gabrielle. Malecki responds with force.
62	18	"The Contender"	Allan Eastman	Jean-Vincent Fournier	March 28, 1993
Vince Egan (Note: John Colicos as Vince) trains Sugar Duke, (Note: Richard Chevolleau as Sugar Duke) whose older brother J.J. remarks, "Cal Sparks better look out." Promoter Jack Roy tries to sign Sugar, disparaging Vince. Roy says Egan is holding Duke back. Lonnie Blanc, (Note: Carlo Rota as Lonnie Blanc) "Someone needs to talk some sense into him." Three thugs beat Vince. J.J. intervenes and calls the team. Sugar's girl Denise (Note: Tonya Lee Williams as Denise) sings Roy's praises for promoting her gigs. Peter suggests pre-empting Roy's Stateside Cable Network fight coverage, then contacts NYPD Detective Al Wilson at Vice. Stone pressures Billy Davis to reveal Vince's assailants. Wilson explains, Roy is connected...wise guys...fixing fights with syndicate money. Roy tells his driver Tommy, we have wrinkles to iron. Three thugs corner Stone; he drops two and threatens a third at gunpoint to reveal his boss. Alexander and Hélène set Peter up as a rival promoter. Gabrielle asks Johnny Black if he threw fights for Roy. "You don't become a world champ without knowing the rules of the game." Peter records a meeting with Roy. Denise warns Sugar, they'll hurt me if you win. The ring announcer (Note: George Chuvalo as Ring Announcer) introduces the boxers...Sugar fights to win. Goons grab Denise to force Sugar to take a dive. The team rescues Denise so Sugar can win.
63	19	"The Raw Truth"	William Fruet	Richard Oleksiak, Tony DiFranco	April 11, 1993
In Washington D.C., journalist Monroe Park (Note: Morton Downey Jr. as Monroe Park) slanders Senator David Carmichael, (Note: Stephen Young as Senator Carmichael) alleging he killed Janet Moore via drunk-driving while "carrying his love child," according to bodyguard Frank Locklee's diary. But, Carmichael's Privacy of Information bill "would severely limit...The Raw Truth." Reporter Betty ambushes Carmichael; chased by her cameraman, he dies in an icy-road crash. Betty kicks a liquor bottle, "Pan up to the car from here." Addington holds the affiliate Balinger (Note: Marc Strange as Balinger) accountable for Park's "fantasies!" "Peter...clear Senator Carmichael's name...put Parks out of business." Detective Roger Burke confirms, Carmichael was sober. Karen Locklee (Note: Deborah Grover as Karen Locklee) admits accepting cash for Frank's non-existent diary. Diana Carmichael refutes Park's claims; Janet's "pregnancy was a just ploy." Hector remarks, "Park...one hell of a dangerous man." Gabrielle, "Propaganda...psychological terror...Australian Army counterintelligence." Hector adds, "Hounds of Hell...specialized in disinformation." Betty ambushes a Nurse at Moorhouse Alcohol Rehabilitation Center, where Carmichael volunteered. Peter enlists rival WNN newswoman Linda Watt for a counter-story. Autobody shop man, Roy Stevenson describes Park's Vietnam tactics. Sinclair demands a retraction; Park invents an exposé, implying Chantal was kidnapped and Hélène's husband killed because she's Alexander's lover, and Sinclair was hired to cover it up. Gabrielle does her own exposé...Peter records the trap they set for Park.
64	20	"Peacemaker"	George Mendeluk	Richard Oleksiak	April 18, 1993
Shamrock radios Leprechaun, "We're closing on the pot of gold." In the Derry hall, Reverend Ian Paully proclaims, "Our Protestant forefathers never capitulated, and neither shall we...The oppression must stop!" While they sing God Save the Queen, the bomb is planted beneath Paully's sedan...and triggered when he leaves. In London, masked men hijack the jet with Addington, Hélène and J.J. aboard. The British General relieves the SAS Lieutenant, and the Under-Secretary of State for Affairs in Northern Ireland, Lord Eames (Note: Mackenzie Gray as Lord Eames) enlists Addington's team to ensure IRA peace talks continue. Peter asks, "Paully's successor?" Alexander, "Oliver Montcalm." (Note: Henry Czerny as Montcalm) In Toronto, Simon Osborn and Pamela Carson (Note: Deborah Duchêne as Pamela Carson) settle into Montcalm's safe house. Peter and Pamela get reacquainted. Hector follows Osborn to a warehouse, opening crates of AK-47s. Eames identifies Osborn as head of the loyalist party's paramilitary, with activist accomplices Jimmy Griffin and Alistair Lee. Peter informs Montcalm of Osborn's activities. Extremist Pamela, opposed to peace after the IRA killed her brother, tips Osborn to Montcalm's meeting. Osborn's men plant a road bomb. Stone takes them out; Sinclair stops the SUV. Pamela, seeing the bomb triggered, goes after Montcalm's wife and kids, "the IRA will be blamed..." Peter interrupts, allowing Gabrielle to disarm Pamela.
65	21	"Muerte"	Allan Eastman	R.B. Carney	May 2, 1993
Sandra (Note: Vanity as Sandra) wakes from a murderous nightmare, turning to Michael (Note: Kim Coates as Michael) for comfort. She's ordered downtown, "Your target is Bill Kaskins, (Note: Walker Boone as Bill Kaskins) President and CEO of Kaskins Industries. Gustaf and Charlie will be with you." At the Huggard Oil gala, Peter and Hector oversee security. Gabrielle senses an ambush; Peter and Hector thwart Sandra's attack. Federal agent David Lexington (Note: Jeff Wincott as Lexington) leads the investigation against Muerte, an international order of assassins. Gabrielle meets with James Elliot, Bill's right-hand man, and Peter meets with Les Huggard. Heidi (Note: Andrea Roth as Heidi) has new targets for Sandra; Sinclair, Germont, and Stone. Kaskins connects to his office via computer. Sandra traces Bill's location, killing Eric. Peter instructs Hector, "Take her alive." Captured, Michael orders Heidi to terminate Sandra. Dr. Morris (Note: Eugene Robert Glazer as Morris) remarks, "Most sophisticated implant I've seen...electrode implanted in her brain connects to a computer chip behind her ear." Stone, "They know exactly where she is." Gabrielle discovers a holding company funneling payments; Kaskins recognizes his shadow company, run by Elliot. A carless nurse enables Sandra's escape; she confronts Elliot for cash to flee the country. The team prevents Heidi from killing Sandra, and Morris works to overcome her brain-washing. Sandra is contained, but the case on Muerte remains open....
66	22	"Badguys"	George Mendeluk	Richard Oleksiak, Tony DiFranco	May 9, 1993
In New York, a fixer videotapes high-end escort Chelsea Little with journalist Jeremy Holifield (Note: Page Fletcher as Jeremy Holifield) who wrote an exposé about the son of a former British prime minister making millions from illegal arms dealing. When Jeremy is murdered, CI Chelsea calls her handler, NYPD Detective Sam Carvaggio. (Note: Lisa Howard as Sam Carvaggio) Chelsea is killed in her cell before the team can question her. Gabriella retrieves Jeremy's notes, which the bad guys then steal. Sinclair goes to question the fixer, Mr. Reynolds, who is shot while they struggle over his pistol. Carvaggio arrests Sinclair and disarms Stone. Reynolds is revealed be Nick Tournelle with the British Consulate. Sinclair is incarcerated in The Tombs for murder. Lord Shefield (Note: Alan Scarfe as Lord Shefield) extorts Addington to drop Holifield's story, or Sinclair might become a prison fatality. He pressures Addington to disband his counterstrike team immediately. After six months, Sinclair is released, allowing Gabriella to release the story, recounting Holifield's notes from memory. Sinclair is weary of being the "White Knight" so Carvaggio, now fired as an detective, suggests they go into business for themselves. Addington expresses his parting thought, "I always thought that when they said 'Silence is Golden' they were talking about its value, not its cost."
