= Killing Patient Zero =

2019 Canadian documentary film

- Film poster
- Directed by: Laurie Lynd
- Written by: Laurie Lynd
- Produced by: Corey Russell
- Cinematography: Paul Steinberg
- Edited by: Trevor Ambrose
- Production company: Fadoo Productions
- Release date: April 26, 2019 (Hot Docs)
- Running time: 100 minutes
- Country: Canada
- Language: English

Killing Patient Zero is a Canadian documentary film, directed by Laurie Lynd and released in 2019. The film is a portrait of Gaëtan Dugas, the Canadian man who was one of the earliest diagnosed HIV/AIDS patients in North America, but became incorrectly demonized as "patient zero" for the epidemic after his role in the early story of the disease was used to illustrate contact tracing in Randy Shilts's 1987 book And the Band Played On.

The film premiered on April 26, 2019, at the Hot Docs Canadian International Documentary Festival. It was released commercially on July 26, 2019.
