= Breakfast with Scot =

2007 film by Laurie Lynd

- Theatrical release poster
- Directed by: Laurie Lynd
- Written by: Sean Reycraft
- Based on: Breakfast with Scot by Michael Downing
- Produced by: Paul Brown; Howard Rosenman; Nadine Schiff
- Starring: Thomas Cavanagh; Ben Shenkman; Noah Bernett
- Cinematography: David A. Makin
- Edited by: Susan Shipton
- Music by: Robert Carli
- Distributed by: Miracle Pictures
- Release date: November 16, 2007
- Running time: 95 minutes
- Country: Canada
- Language: English

Breakfast with Scot is a 2007 Canadian comedy film, about a gay couple who unexpectedly become parents for a stereotypically feminine boy, disrupting their semi-closeted lives. It is adapted from the 1999 novel by Tufts University professor Michael Downing. The screenplay was adapted by Sean Reycraft from the novel by Michael Downing, and the film was directed by Laurie Lynd.

The film attracted significant press attention in 2006, when the National Hockey League and the Toronto Maple Leafs announced that they had approved the use of the team's logo and uniforms in the film. Breakfast with Scot was the first gay-themed film to receive this type of approval from a professional sports league.

== Plot ==
Eric McNally (Tom Cavanagh) is a gay retired hockey player turned television sportscaster who lives with his partner Sam (Ben Shenkman), a sports lawyer. Sam unexpectedly becomes the legal guardian of his brother's stepson, Scot (Noah Bernett), due to his mother's overdose.

This immediately turns their lives upside down because Eric is not patient and is not used to having a child in his house. In addition to the demands of being a parent, Scot's non-traditional choices of clothing and hobbies begin to intrude on Eric's desire to remain closeted at work. As Eric and his partner Sam try to teach Scot how to be a stereotypical boy to prevent bullying at school, Scot experiences gender dysmorphia while completely changing his identity.

Over time, Eric's unwillingness to accept the situation eventually fades as Scot teaches Eric about loving your true self and accepting one's identity.

== Cast ==
- Tom Cavanagh as Eric McNally
- Ben Shenkman as Sam
- Noah Bernett as Scot
- Jeananne Goossen as Nula
- Benz Antoine as Greg Graham
- Shauna MacDonald as Joan
- Graham Greene as Bud Wilson
- Vanessa Thompson as Carla
- Alexander Franks as Joey Morita
- Dylan Everett as Ryan Burlington
- Colin Cunningham as Billy
- Anna Silk as Mia
- Megan Follows as Barbara Warren
- Robin Brûlé as Ms. Paul
- Cameron Ansell as Finn O'Brien
- William Cuddy as Young Maple Leafs Fan
- Fiona Reid as Mildred Monterossos
- Sheila McCarthy as Miss Patterson (uncredited)
- Jay Anderson as Toronto Head Coach opening scenes

== Release and reception ==
In early 2007, several months before the film's release, an excerpt was screened at Toronto's Inside Out Film and Video Festival as an advance preview, alongside Lynd's earlier short films RSVP and The Fairy Who Didn't Want to Be a Fairy Anymore.

One evangelical Christian group, the Canada Family Action Coalition, responded to the film with anger, calling for a boycott of Maple Leaf Sports and Entertainment (MLSE).

The film won the Globola Audience Award for the best international movie at the Lesbisch Schwule Filmtage Hamburg (Hamburg International Queer Film Festival) in October 2008.

It won the Family Feature Film award from the Directors Guild of Canada, November 2008.
