= Jacqueline Samuda =

Canadian actress, director and writer

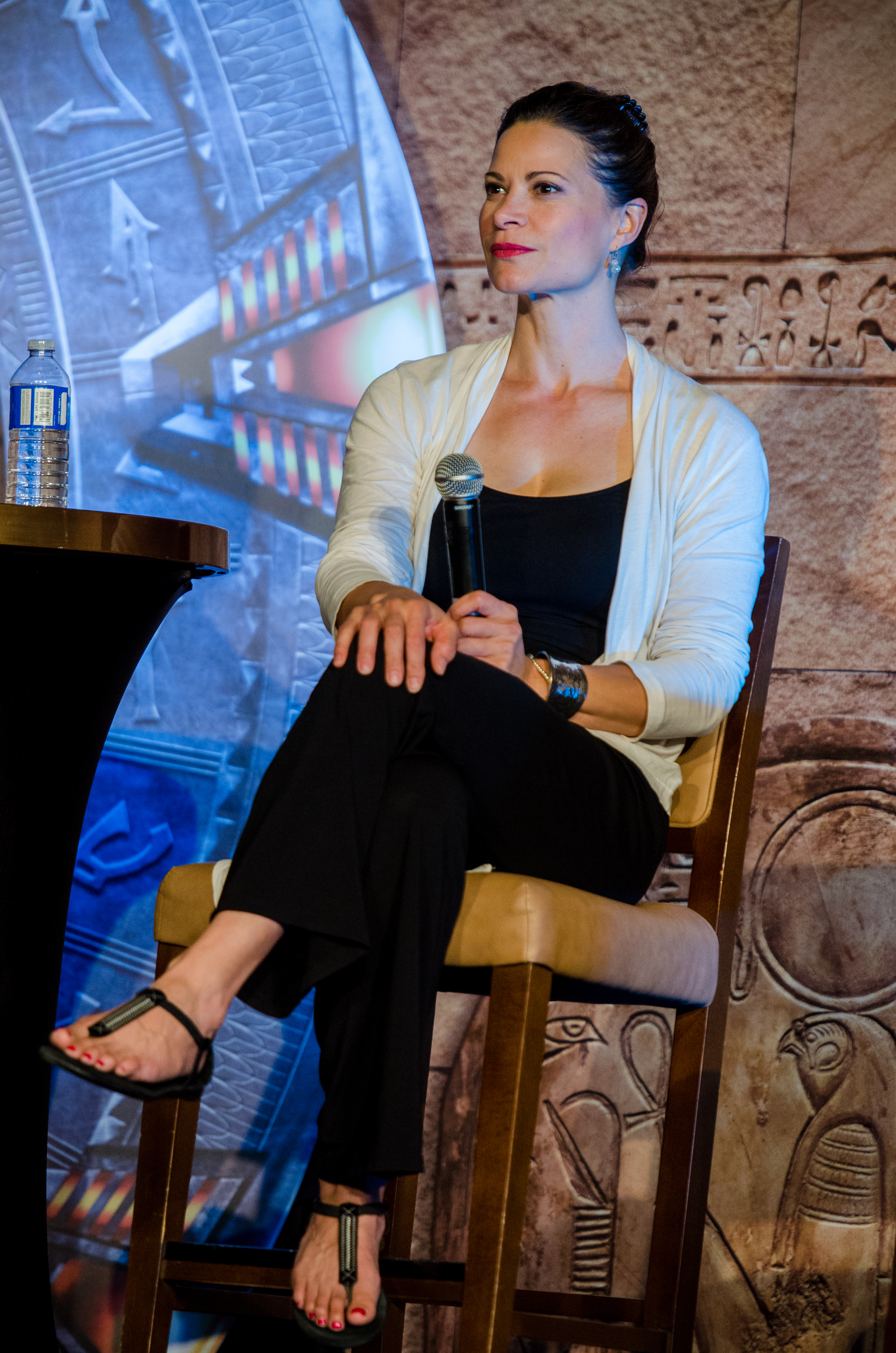
- Born: 1963 (age 62–63); Ottawa, Ontario, Canada
- Occupations: Actress, voice actress, director, writer
- Years active: 1985-present
- Spouse: Rob Riley (2005-present) (2 children)
- Website: http://www.jacquelinesamuda.com

Jacqueline Samuda (born 1963 in Ottawa) is a Canadian actress, director and writer.

== Biography ==
Samuda was born in Ottawa, Ontario, and grew up in both the United States and Canada. She received a B.F.A. Degree in Performance from York University in Toronto, and apprenticed at the prestigious Shaw Festival in Niagara-on-the Lake, Ontario. An experienced film/TV/stage/voice actress, Jacqueline has appeared in recurring roles on TV's Spooksville, The L Word and the epic sci-fi series Stargate SG-1 and in many other feature film, TV episodic and animation projects. She is a busy voiceover performer who has voiced many international and national commercial campaigns and many other projects, from audiobooks to videogames to corporate and documentary film. She was a finalist for the 2008 VOICEY Awards, an international voiceover award. As a writer/director, Jacqueline was honoured with the inaugural prize of the Motion Picture Producers Association/Women in the Directors' Chair Feature Film Award in 2008. A past BC Film Writer’s Fellow and instructor at Vancouver Film School and UBC’s Writing Centre, she also has story edited and polished many screenplays, including The Delicate Art of Parking and The Foursome. Her directing background spans theatre in Toronto and L.A. (garnering a Best Director L.A. Critics’ Award for Zastrozzi), and seven short films (received awards, screenings at film festivals and TV distribution). She has taught Directing Actors as a Guest Artist at University of Los Angeles. She has served as president of the board of directors for Pacific Cinématheque, Vancouver’s non-profit cultural cinema venue. Jacqueline has been active on the board of Vancouver's Women in Film, where she served as president of the board 2001-2003 and on the advisory board in subsequent years. In 2008, Jacqueline was honoured to receive a Lifetime Member Award for her work with Women in Film.

== Filmography ==
=== Film ===
Year	Title	Role	Notes
1988	A New Life	Mara	
1989	Renegades	Woman Cop	
1989	Speaking Parts	Bride	
1991	The Adjuster	Louise	
1997	One of Our Own	Corporal Kim Deeves	
1999	The Arrangement	Olga	
1999	Making Contact	Ellen	
2003	Jam Space	Beautiful Woman	Short film
2003	50 Questions	Director	Short film for Crazy8s
2003	See Grace Fly	Grace (voice)	
2005	Sub Zero	Sasha Mirov	Video
2008	Stargate: Continuum	Nirrti	Video
2008	Edison and Leo	Toni / Nirena (voice)	

=== Television ===
Year	Title	Role	Notes
1985	Shock Chamber	Linda	Segment: "Symbol of Victory"
1987	Adderly	Modeling Agent	Episode: "A Matter of Discretion"
1990	Leona Helmsley: The Queen of Mean	Reporter	TV film
1990	Street Legal	Nancy Crosbie	Episode: "The Psychic"
1991	Counterstrike	Victoria Condrade	Episode: "Fall From Grace"
1992	To Catch a Killer	Unknown	TV film
1999, 2001, 2003	Stargate SG-1	Nirrti	Episodes: "Fair Game", "Rites of Passage" and "Metamorphosis"; Also writer of "Metamorphosis"
2000	First Target	Patti	TV film
2001	Da Vinci's Inquest	Joyce Zisner	Episode: "The Sparkle Tour"
2001	The Chris Isaak Show	Nedra Wing	Episode: "Freud's Dilemma"
2001	Night Visions	Melissa	Episode: "Used Car"
2001	Wolf Lake	Jean Hollander	Episode: "The Changing"
2002	Wasted	Chris' Mom	TV film
2003	Wilder Days	Pearl	TV film
2004	The L Word	Movie Type	Episode: "Pilot"
2006	A Girl Like Me: The Gwen Araujo Story	Angie	TV film
2006	Saved	Nurse #1	Episode: "Triage"
2007	Bionic Woman	Med-Flight Tech #2	Episode: "Pilot"
2007	Smallville	ER Doctor #1	Episode: "Bizarro"
2008	The L Word	Saundra Houston	Episodes: "Lesbians Gone Wild", "Lunar Cycle"
2009	The L Word	Saundra Houston	Episode: "LMFAO"
2012	R. L. Stine's The Haunting Hour	Gracie's Mom	Episode: "Headshot"
2013	Arrow	TV Host	Episode: "Burned"
2014	When Sparks Fly	Gloria	TV film
2015	Real Murderers: An Aurora Teagarden Mystery	Mamie	TV film
2015	Once Upon a Holiday	Margaret Wickersham	TV film
2017–2020	Marvel Super Hero Adventures	Captain Marvel	Voice; 3 episodes
2019	When Calls the Heart	Joyce	Episode: "Heart of a Mountie"
2023	Virgin River	Lydia Adler	Episode: "Trial By Fire"

=== Video games ===
Year	Title	Role	Notes
2010	Dead Rising 2: Case West	The Director	
2011	BackStab HD	Coleta	
2015	Crypt of the Necrodancer	Aria	
2016	Homeworld: Deserts Of Kharak	Khagaan	
