= James Purcell (actor) =

American actor and filmmaker

- Born: Steelton, Pennsylvania, U.S.
- Occupations: Actor; filmmaker; director
- Years active: 1986–present

James Purcell is an American actor and filmmaker, who has worked predominantly in Canadian film and television. He is most noted for his starring role as Hector Stone in the television drama series Counterstrike, for which he won the Gemini Award for Best Actor in a Drama Series at the 8th Gemini Awards in 1994.

Originally from Steelton, Pennsylvania, Purcell had his earliest roles in American film and television before moving to Toronto, Ontario after being cast in the television film adaptation of Elmore Leonard's novel Glitz. His other roles have included the films North of Pittsburgh and Sabotage, and supporting or guest appearances in the television series Knots Landing, The Gangster Chronicles, Fame, Cagney & Lacey, Falcon Crest, Riptide, Night Heat, Diamonds, Katts and Dog, 21 Jump Street, Due South, Da Vinci's Inquest, The L Word, Stargate SG-1, The Summit and Murdoch Mysteries.

He directed the 1995 film Fools Die Fast.
