= Laurie Lynd =

Canadian director

- Born: May 19, 1959 (age 67); Toronto, Ontario, Canada
- Occupations: Film and television director, screenwriter

Laurie Lynd (born May 19, 1959) is a Canadian film and television director and screenwriter, best known as the director of the feature film Breakfast with Scot.

Born in Toronto, Ontario, Lynd made the short films Together and Apart (1986) and RSVP (1991) early in his career. The latter of which was cited by film critic B. Ruby Rich in her influential 1992 essay on the emergence of New Queer Cinema. He then attended the Canadian Film Centre, making the short film The Fairy Who Didn't Want to Be a Fairy Anymore (1992) and the feature film House (1995) while studying at that institution; he was also credited as the producer of John Greyson's CFC project The Making of Monsters.

After his graduation from the CFC, he concentrated primarily on television directing, including the television films Sibs and Open Heart, and episodes of Degrassi, Queer as Folk, I Was a Rat, Noah's Arc and Ghostly Encounters.

Breakfast with Scot, his second feature film, was released in 2007. His subsequent television work has included Forensic Factor, Baxter, Murdoch Mysteries, Good Witch, Schitt's Creek and The Adventures of Napkin Man.

In 2010 he released the short film Verona, which recast Romeo and Juliet as a romance between two gay university athletes from rival fraternities.

In 2019 he released the documentary film Killing Patient Zero.
