= B. Ruby Rich =

American scholar and film critic

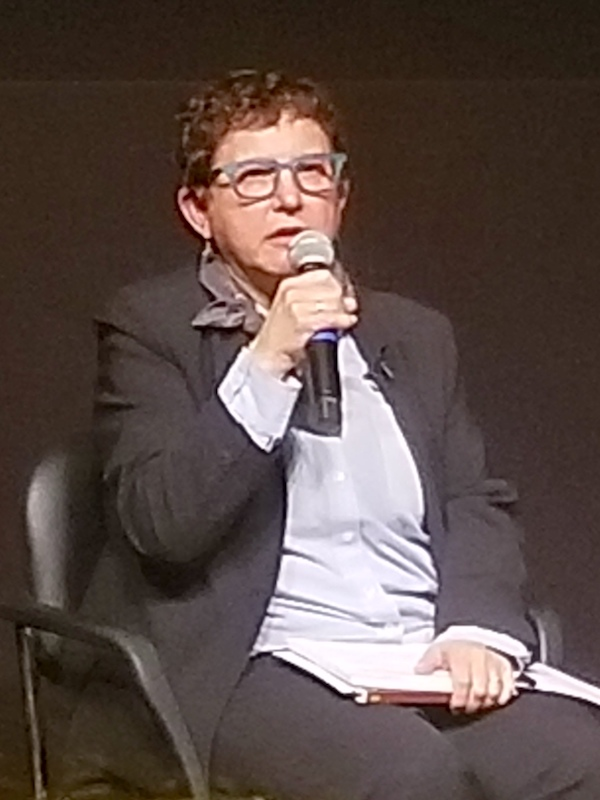
- B. Ruby Rich in April 2017
- Born: Boston, Massachusetts, United States
- Education: Yale University
- Occupations: Scholar; Professor Emerita University of California, Santa Cruz; film critic
- Known for: Coining the term "new queer cinema"

B. Ruby Rich is an American scholar; critic of independent, Latin American, documentary, feminist, and queer films; and a professor emeritus of film and digital media at UC Santa Cruz. Among her many contributions, she is known for coining the term "new queer cinema". She is currently the editor of Film Quarterly, a scholarly film journal published by University of California Press.

== Life and career ==
Rich began her career in film exhibition as co-founder of a film society in Woods Hole, Massachusetts. In 1973, she became associate director of what is now the Gene Siskel Film Center at the Art Institute of Chicago. After working as film critic for the Chicago Reader, she moved to New York City to become the director of the film program for the New York State Council on the Arts, where she worked for a decade. While living in New York City, she began writing for The Village Voice. She then moved to San Francisco, where she began teaching, first at the University of California, Berkeley, and then at UC Santa Cruz in 2004. As professor of film and digital media there, she helped to build the Social Documentation graduate program.

Rich was an early member of the selection committee at Sundance Film Festival, served as an international programmer at Toronto International Film Festival in 2002, was guest director of Telluride Film Festival in 1996, and appears regularly at Provincetown International Film Festival. Her film reviews in major national publications and her commentary on public broadcasting programs such as All Things Considered have led to her being characterized as a central figure in cinema studies. In 2017, the Barbican hosted a season of films and talks to commemorate her career as a film critic, academic, and curator.

Rich is now professor emeritus at UC Santa Cruz, and lives in San Francisco and Paris.

=== Contributions ===
Rich coined the term "new queer cinema" in a 1992 article for The Village Voice, which was reprinted in Sight and Sound. In the article, Rich identified a wave of films that "collided" at film festivals such as Sundance and TIFF. Rich asserted that these independent films, made by and for queer people, used radical aesthetics to combat homophobia, grapple with the trauma of the AIDS epidemic, and address complicated queer subjectivities while importing much-needed discussions of race. Rich argued that, although films dealing with these issues can be found in the previous decade, new queer cinema broke with the gay liberation ethos that self-representation should remain positive and desirable.

In 2013, Rich accepted the position of editor-in-chief at Film Quarterly. She re-organized its editorial board and re-launched its website with several new features, including the "Quorum" column and video recordings of webinars. She stepped down from the position in 2023.

Rich was a regular contributor to The Village Voice, the San Francisco Bay Guardian, and Sight and Sound. She has also contributed to The Guardian, The Nation, Elle, Mirabella, The Advocate, and Out. She was the founding editor of film/video reviews for GLQ: A Journal of Lesbian and Gay Studies.

=== Media appearances ===
In 1999, Rich appeared as a guest critic on two episodes of At the Movies.

B. Ruby Rich appears in the 2009 documentary film For the Love of Movies: The Story of American Film Criticism, where she discusses the appeal of the film Amélie and expresses her desire for a new kind of criticism to emerge from young critics who can go beyond auteur theory.

She appears in the film !Women Art Revolution.

She continues to appear on selected Criterion releases.

== Publications ==
=== Chick Flicks: Theories and Memories of the Feminist Film Movement ===
Her 1998 book, Chick Flicks: Theories and Memories of the Feminist Film Movement, is a journalistic and historical memoir chronicling the feminist film movement. The book includes critical analyses of Sally Potter's Thriller, the films of Yvonne Rainer, and Leontine Sagan's Mädchen in Uniform.

=== New Queer Cinema: The Director's Cut ===
Mostly an assemblage of Rich's published writing on queer films of the preceding decades, New Queer Cinema: The Director's Cut moves from the moment of new queer cinema's inception in the early 1990s festival circuit, to its Hollywood co-option in the late 1990s, to its more recent international impact and European and U.S. mainstreaming. The book includes studies of the films The Watermelon Woman, Go Fish, and Milk, as well as the films of Lucrecia Martel and Gregg Araki.

== Awards ==
Rich received a 2006 Lifetime Achievement Award from the Society for Cinema and Media Studies and the 2007 Brudner Prize at Yale University. In 2012, she was awarded the Frameline Award – the first critic to receive this honor since Vito Russo was given the first. In 2014, the Guadalajara International Film Festival presented her with its Queer Icon Maguey Award. In 2017, she was honored in London with an event titled "Being Ruby Rich: Film Curation as Advocacy and Activism" that included a study day at Birkbeck, University of London, and several days of screenings at the Barbican Centre cinema.
