= List of Malcolm McDowell performances =

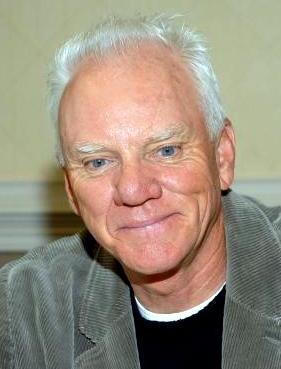
McDowell in 2008.

English actor Malcolm McDowell made his screen debut as Mick Travis in the 1968 satire If.... and came to international prominence three years later with his portrayal of Alex DeLarge in A Clockwork Orange (1971). His subsequent credits include: The Raging Moon (1971), O Lucky Man! (1973), Voyage of the Damned (1976), Time After Time (1979), Caligula (1979), Cat People (1982), Blue Thunder (1983), The Caller (1987), Star Trek Generations (1994), Tank Girl (1995), Mr. Magoo (1997), Gangster No. 1 (2000), I Spy (2002), I'll Sleep When I'm Dead (2003), The Company (2003), Doomsday (2008), Easy A (2010), The Artist (2011) and Bombshell (2019). He also played Dr. Samuel Loomis in the 2007 remake of Halloween and its sequel, Halloween II (2009).

Outside film, McDowell has appeared in recurring roles on Entourage (2005–2011) and Heroes (2006–2007), and had starring roles on Franklin & Bash (2011–2014) and Mozart in the Jungle (2014–2018). He has played Patrick "Pop" Critch on the Canadian series Son of a Critch since 2022. He has also voiced characters in various animated shows, films and video games, including Superman: The Animated Series (1996–1999), Metalocalypse (2007–2012), Bolt (2008), Fallout 3 (2008), The Elder Scrolls franchise (2014–2021), and Call of Duty: Black Ops III (2016).

== Film ==
Year	Title	Role	Notes
1967	Poor Cow	Billy	Scenes deleted
1968	If....	Mick Travis	
1970	Figures in a Landscape	Ansell	
1971	The Raging Moon	Bruce Pritchard	Nominated—National Society of Film Critics Award for Best Actor
1971	A Clockwork Orange	Alex DeLarge	Evening Standard British Film Award for Best Actor; Nominated—Golden Globe Award for Best Actor – Motion Picture Drama; Nominated—National Society of Film Critics Award for Best Actor; Nominated—New York Film Critics Circle Award for Best Actor
1973	O Lucky Man!	Mick Travis, Plantation Thief	Also writer
1975	Royal Flash	Capt. Harry Flashman	
1976	Aces High	Gresham	
1976	Voyage of the Damned	Max Gunter	
1979	The Passage	Capt. Maxim Von Berkow	
1979	Caligula	Caligula	
1979	Time After Time	H. G. Wells	Nominated—Saturn Award for Best Actor
1982	Cat People	Paul Gallier	
1982	Britannia Hospital	Mick Travis: The Media	
1982	The Compleat Beatles	Narrator	Voice, documentary
1983	Blue Thunder	United States Army Col. F.E. Cochrane	
1983	Cross Creek	Max Perkins	
1983	Get Crazy	Reggie Wanker	
1985	Gulag	Gulag	
1987	The Caller	The Caller	
1988	Buy & Cell	Warden Tennant	
1988	Sunset	Alfie Alperin	
1989	Mortacci	Edmondo	
1989	Happily Ever After	Lord Malice	Voice
1990	Il Maestro	Walter Goldberg	
1990	Moon 44	Major Lee	
1990	Class of 1999	Miles Langford	
1990	Maggio musicale	Pier Francesco Ferraioli	
1990	In the Eye of the Snake	Professor Baldwin	
1990	Jezebel's Kiss	Benjamin J. Faberson	
1990	Disturbed	Derrek Russell	
1990	Schweitzer	Albert Schweitzer	
1991	The Assassin of the Tsar	Timofeyev, Yurovsky	
1992	The Player	Himself	Cameo
1992	Chain of Desire	Hubert Bailey	
1993	Vent d'est	General Smyslovsky	
1993	Night Train to Venice	Stranger	
1993	Bopha!	De Villiers	
1994	Cyborg 3: The Recycler	Lord Talon	Direct-to-video
1994	Milk Money	Waltzer	
1994	Star Trek Generations	Tolian Soran	
1995	The Surgeon	Dr. Stein	
1995	Dangerous Indescretion	Roger Everett	
1995	Tank Girl	Kesslee	
1995	Fist of the North Star	Ryuken	
1995	Kids of the Round Table	Merlin	
1995	Sharks of the Red Triangle	Narrator	Voice, documentary
1995	Fatal Pursuit	Bechtel	
1996	Where Truth Lies	Vernon Renquist	
1996	Ringer	Noel	
1997	2103: The Deadly Wake	Captain Sean Murdoch	
1997	Asylum	Sullivan Rane, Doc	
1997	Hugo Pool	Henry	
1997	Mr. Magoo	Austin Cloquet	
1998	The Fairy King of Ar	Ian	
1998	The First 9½ Weeks	Francois Dubois	Direct-to-video
1998	The Gardener	Ben Carter	
1999	Southern Cross	Felipe Solano	
1999	Love Lies Bleeding	Malcolm Mead	
1999	Y2K	General Seward	
1999	My Life So Far	Uncle Morris MacIntosh	
2000	Gangster No. 1	Gangster 55	
2001	Stanley Kubrick: A Life in Pictures	Himself	Documentary
2001	Just Visiting	Wizard	
2001	The Void	Thomas Abernathy	Direct-to-video
2002	Between Strangers	Alan Baxter	
2002	I Spy	Gundars	
2002	The Barber	Dexter Miles	
2003	I'll Sleep When I'm Dead	Boad	
2003	Tempo	Walter Shrenger	
2003	Inhabited	Phil Werner	Direct-to-video
2003	The Company	Alberto Antonelli	
2003	Red Roses and Petrol	Enda Doyle	Also associate producer
2004	Pact with the Devil	Henry	
2004	Hidalgo	Major Davenport	Uncredited
2004	Evilenko	Andrej Romanovic Evilenko	
2004	Bobby Jones: A Stroke of Genius	O.B. Keeler	
2004	Tempesta	Paul Valenzin	
2004	In Good Company	Teddy K – Globecom CEO	Uncredited
2004	Pinocchio 3000	Scamboli	Voice
2005	Rag Tale	Richard (The Chief) Morton	
2005	Mirror Wars: Reflection One	Murdock	
2005	Dinotopia: Quest for the Ruby Sunstone	Ogthar	Voice, direct-to-video
2006	Bye Bye Benjamin	Mr. Coleman	Short film
2006	Cut Off	James Burton	
2007	The List	Desmond Larochette	
2007	Exitz	Percy	
2007	Never Apologize	Himself	Documentary; also writer and producer
2007	Halloween	Samuel Loomis	
2008	Doomsday	Kane	
2008	The Evening Journey	Captain Henry	Short film
2008	Blue Gold: World Water Wars	Narrator	Voice, documentary
2008	Bolt	Dr. Calico	Voice
2008	Delgo	Raius	Voice
2008	The Secret Adventures of Mr. Grant	Subjectm Doctor	Uncredited
2009	Halloween II	Samuel Loomis	
2009	Super Rhino	Dr. Calico	Voice; Short film
2009	Suck	Eddie Van Helsing	
2010	The Book of Eli	Lombardi	Uncredited
2010	Barry Munday	Mr. Farley	
2010	Tom and Jerry Meet Sherlock Holmes	Professor Moriarty	Voice, direct-to-video
2010	Easy A	Principal Gibbons	
2010	Monster Butler	Roy Fontaine	
2010	Pound of Flesh	Noah Melville	
2010	DC Showcase: Green Arrow	Merlyn	Voice, short film
2010	Golf in the Kingdom	Julian Lange	
2010	Santiago Files	Narrator	Voice, documentary
2011	L.A., I Hate You	Harold Weintraub	
2011	The Artist	The Butler	
2011	The Unleashed	Narrator	
2011	Suing the Devil	Satan	Also producer
2011	No Rest for the Wicked: A Basil & Moebius Adventure	Mr. Bloome	Short film
2012	Excision	Mr. Cooper	
2012	Antiviral	Dr. Abendroth	
2012	A Green Story	Barton	
2012	Vamps	Vlad Tepish	
2012	Silent Hill: Revelation 3D	Leonard	
2012	Silent Night	Sheriff Cooper	
2013	Richard the Lionheart	King Henry II	
2013	Sanitarium	Dr. Stenson	
2013	The Employer	The Employer	Also executive producer
2013	Meet the Small Potatoes	Lester Koop	Voice
2013	Zombex	Dr. Soulis	
2014	Tbilisi, I Love You	Mr. M	
2014	Mischief Night	Mr. Smiles	
2014	Shock Value	Edmund Dean Huntley	
2014	Free Fall	Thaddeus Gault	
2014	Some Kind of Beautiful	Gordon	
2015	Bereave	Garvey	Also executive producer
2015	Lady Psycho Killer	Gerald Portersen	
2015	Dusha shpiona	Henry	
2015	Scooby-Doo! Moon Monster Madness	Sly Baron	Voice, direct-to-video
2015	Kids vs Monsters	Boss Monster	
2015	Oceanus: Act One	Triton (Ship's Computer)	Voice, short film
2015	Cowboys & Engines	Dr. Clay	Short film
2016	The Black Hole	Mr. Simms	
2016	31	Father Murder	Nominated—BloodGuts UK Horror Award for Best Supporting Actor
2017	Mississippi Murder	McGowan	
2017	Death Race 2050	Chairman	Direct-to-video
2017	Walk of Fame	Evan Polus	
2017	Grow House	Dr. Doobie	
2017	American Satan	Mr. Capricorn	
2017	Yamasong: March of the Hollows	Lord Geer	Voice
2017	Culture of Fear	Evo	
2018	Dreams I Never Had	Judge Messner	Also associate producer
2018	Abnormal Attraction	Boogeyman	
2018	Corbin Nash	Blind Prophet	
2019	Bombshell	Rupert Murdoch	Nominated—Critics' Choice Movie Award for Best Acting Ensemble; Nominated—Screen Actors Guild Award for Outstanding Performance by a Cast in a Motion Picture
2020	The Big Ugly	Harris	Also executive producer
2020	The Christmas Chronicles 2	Hakan	Voice
2020	Timecrafters: The Treasure of Pirate's Cove	Captain Lynch	
2020	Free Lunch Express	Narrator	
2021	Blood on the Crown	Colonel Saville	
2021	She Will	Hathbourne	
2021	A Wonderful Kingdom	Narrator	Voice, documentary
2021	Pups Alone	Oliver	Voice
2021	A Forbidden Orange (La naranja prohibida)	Narrator, Himself	Documentary
2022	Father Stu	Monsignor Kelly	
2022	Moving On	Howard	
2022	The Walk	McLaughlin	
2023	Metalocalypse: Army of the Doomstar	Vater Orlaag	Voice, direct-to-video
2023	Et Tu	The Janitor	
2024	Thelma	Harvey	
2024	Theater of Mystery	Spirit of the Theater	Voice, short film
2024	Cellphone	Bob	Voice
2024	The Partisan	Trenchcoat	
2025	Trick and Treats	Trick	Voice
2025	Last Train to Fortune	Cecil Peachtree	
2025	The Panic	Stanford White	
2025	Ever After	The Frog Prince	Voice
2026	Psycho Killer	Mr. Pendleton	

== Television ==
Year	Title	Role	Notes
1967	Dixon of Dock Green	Ronnie Patterson	Episode: "Zandra"
1967	Sat'day While Sunday	Frankie	13 episodes
1967	The Newcomers	Ernie	6 episodes
1969	The Wednesday Play	Happy	Episode: "Happy"
1976	Great Performances	Bill	Episode: "The Collection"
1978	She Fell Among Thieves	Richard Chandos	Television film
1980	Look Back in Anger	Jimmy Porter	Television film
1980	Saturday Night Live	Host	Episode: "Malcolm McDowell/Captain Beefheart & the Magic Band"
1983	Faerie Tale Theatre	Reginald Von Lupin, The Wolf	Episode: "Little Red Riding Hood"
1985	Merlin and the Sword	King Arthur	Television film
1986	Monte Carlo	Christopher Quinn	2 episodes
1991	Tales from the Crypt	Donald Longtooth	Episode: "The Reluctant Vampire"
1993–1995	Captain Planet and the Planeteers	Zarm	Voice, 2 episodes
1994	The Man Who Wouldn't Die	Bernard Drake, Ian Morrissey	Television film
1994	Seasons of the Heart	Alfred McGuinness	Television film
1994	Frasier	Dr. Bruga	Voice, episode: "Give Him the Chair!"
1994	Aladdin	Shaman	Voice, episode: "Raiders of the Lost Shark"
1995	Batman: The Animated Series	Arkady Duvall	Voice, episode: "Showdown"
1996	The Great War and the Shaping of the 20th Century	Czar Nicholas II, Charles Stockwell, Stephen Graham	Voice, documentary
1996	Our Friends in the North	Benny Barratt	5 episodes
1996	Spider-Man: The Animated Series	Abraham Whistler	Voice, 2 episodes
1996	The Little Riders	Capt. Kessel	Television film
1996	Yesterday's Target	Holden	Television film
1996	Biker Mice from Mars	Dominic T. Stilton	Voice, episode: "Once Upon a Time on Mars"
1996–1997	Pearl	Professor Stephen Pynchon	22 episodes
1996	Wing Commander Academy	Commodore Geoffrey Tolwyn	Voice, 13 episodes
1996–1997	Captain Simian & the Space Monkeys	Rhesus 2	Voice, 2 episodes
1996–1999	Superman: The Animated Series	John Corben/Metallo	Voice, 6 episodes
1997	Adventures from the Book of Virtues	Indra	Voice, episode: "Loyality"
1997	Lexx	Yottskry	Episode "Giga Shadow"
1997	The Magic School Bus	Mr. McClean	Voice, episode: "Gets Programmed"
1998–1999	Fantasy Island	Mr. Roarke	13 episodes
1999	Can of Worms	Barnabus	Voice, television film
1999	The Outer Limits	Ship	Voice, episode: "The Human Operators"
2000	The David Cassidy Story	Jack Cassidy	Television film
2000	St. Patrick: The Irish Legend	Quentin	Television film
2000	Island of the Dead	Rupert King	Television film
2000	South Park	A British Person	Episode: "Pip"
2001	Princess of Thieves	Sheriff of Nottingham	Television film
2002	Firestarter: Rekindled	John Rainbird	2 episodes
2002	Night Visions	Martin Hudson	Episode: "Patterns"
2003–2004	Teen Titans	Mad Mod	Voice, 2 episodes
2004	ChalkZone	Barney the Encyclocentipedia	Voice, episode: "The Big Blow Up"
2005–2011	Entourage	Terrance McQuewick	11 episodes
2005	Justice League Unlimited	John Corben/Metallo	Voice, episode: "Chaos at the Earth's Core"
2005	The Grim Adventures of Billy & Mandy	Baron Von Ghoulish	Voice, episode: "Billy and Mandy Save Christmas"
2006	Monk	Julian Hodge	Episode: "Mr. Monk Goes to a Fashion Show"
2006	Law & Order: Criminal Intent	Jonas Slaughter	Episode: "Proud Flesh"
2006	The Curse of King Tut's Tomb	Nathan Cairns	Television film
2006–2007	Heroes	Daniel Linderman	10 episodes
2007	War and Peace	Prince Bolkonsky	4 episodes
2007	Robot Chicken: Star Wars	Orientation Instructor	Voice, television short
2007	Masters of Science Fiction	Tibor Cargrew	Episode: "Jerry Was a Man"
2007	Robot Chicken	1776 Announcer, Reporter	Voice, episode: "Moesha Poppins"
2007–2012	Metalocalypse	Vater Orlaag, News Anchor, Kloketteer	Voice, 37 episodes
2008–2014	Phineas and Ferb	Grandpa Reginald "Reg" Fletcher	Voice, 8 episodes
2008	Coco Chanel	Marc Bouchier	Television film
2010–2012	Hero Factory	Akiyama Makuhero	Voice, 4 episodes
2010–2012	CSI: Miami	Darren Vogel	3 episodes
2010–2013	The Mentalist	Bret Stiles	5 episodes
2011–2014	Franklin & Bash	Stanton Infeld	40 episodes
2011	Psych	Ambassador Fanshaw	Episode: "Shawn Rescues Darth Vader"
2012	Kung Fu Panda: Legends of Awesomeness	Shirong	Voice, episode: "Father Crime"
2012	The High Fructose Adventures of Annoying Orange	The Dark Knight	Voice, episode: "Sir Juice-a-Lot"
2012	Home Alone: The Holiday Heist	Sinclair	Television film
2012	The Philadelphia Experiment	Morton Salinger	Television film
2013	Community	Professor Noel Cornwallis	2 episodes
2013	Metalocalypse: The Doomstar Requiem	Vater Orlaag	Voice, television film
2014–2018	Mozart in the Jungle	Thomas Pembridge	34 episodes
2015	Jake and the Never Land Pirates	Lord Fathom	Voice, 2 episodes
2015	Wallykazam!	Flouse	Voice, episode: "A Flouse in the House"
2015–2016	TripTank	Priest, Cloud, Fart Philosopher	Voice, 4 episodes
2017	Jeff & Some Aliens	Zib Zog, Grandfather	Voice, 3 episodes
2017–2018	We Bare Bears	Professor Lampwick	Voice, 2 episodes
2017	Dawn of the Croods	Skermiggleflop	Voice, episode: "They Might Be Sky Giants"
2017	Welcome to the Wayne	Furton Binklemurton	Voice, episode: "Beeping the Binklemobile"
2018	Star Wars Rebels	Minister Hydan	Voice, 2 episodes
2018	Chicago Med	Marvin Jaffrey	Episode: "On Shaky Ground"
2020	Teen Titans Go!	Baxtory	Voice, episode: "Mission to Find the Lost Stems"
2020	Scooby-Doo and Guess Who?	Himself	Voice, episode: "A Run Cycle Through Time!"
2020	Truth Seekers	Richard	8 episodes
2021	Castlevania	Varney/Death	Voice, 7 episodes
2021–2023	Gossip Girl	Roger Menzies	4 episodes
2022–present	Son of a Critch	Patrick "Pop" Critch	Nomination: Canadian Screen Award for Best Supporting Performance in a Comedy Series - 2022
2023	Everybody Loves Diamonds	Gerald Khan	3 episodes
2024	SpongeBob SquarePants	Percival Rockhound	Voice, episode: "Pet the Rock"
2024–present	Ark: The Animated Series	Senator Lucius Cassius Virilis	Voice

== Video games ==
Year	Title	Role
1994	Wing Commander III: Heart of the Tiger	Adm. Geoffrey Tolwyn
1996	Wing Commander IV: The Price of Freedom	Adm. Geoffrey Tolwyn
1996	Mummy: Tomb of the Pharaoh	Stuart Davenport
1997	Star Trek Generations	Dr. Tolian Soran
1999	Superman	Metallo
2002	Superman: Shadow of Apokolips	Metallo
2004	Champions of Norrath	Pelys
2008	Fallout 3	Pres. John Henry Eden
2009	Command & Conquer: Red Alert 3 – Uprising	EU Pres. Rupert Thornley
2009	Wet	Rupert Pelham
2009	Bolt	Dr. Calico
2010	God of War III	Daedalus
2011	Killzone 3	Jorhan Stahl
2014	The Elder Scrolls Online	Molag Bal
2015	The Elder Scrolls Online: Tamriel Unlimited	Molag Bal
2016	Call of Duty: Black Ops III	Dr. Monty
2017	The Elder Scrolls Online: Morrowind	Molag Bal
2018	The Elder Scrolls Online: Summerset	Molag Bal
2019	The Elder Scrolls Online: Elsweyr	Molag Bal
2020	The Elder Scrolls Online: Greymoor	Molag Bal
2021	The Elder Scrolls Online: Blackwood	Molag Bal

== Music videos ==
Year	Title	Artist
2009	"Snuff"	Slipknot

== Theatre ==
Year	Title	Role	Venue
1965	Henry V	Unknown	Aldwych Theatre
1965	The Thwarting of Baron Bolligrew	Peasant	Aldwych Theatre
1966	Henry IV, Part 2	Duke of Clarence	Royal Shakespeare Theatre
1966	Henry IV, Part 1	Unknown	Royal Shakespeare Theatre
1966	Hamlet	Messenger 2	Royal Shakespeare Theatre
1966	Henry V	Duke of Clarence	Royal Shakespeare Theatre
1968	Twelfth Night	Sebastian	Royal Court Theatre
1975	Entertaining Mr. Sloane	Mr. Sloane	Royal Court Theatre, Duke of York's Theatre
1980	Look Back in Anger	Jimmy Porter	23rd Street Theater
1984	In Celebration	Andrew Shaw	New York City Center
1987	Holiday	Johnny Case	The Old Vic
1987	Hunting Cockroaches	Janek	Mark Taper Forum
1993	Another Time	Ike Lands, Leonard Lands	American Jewish Theater
1995	The Importance of Being Wilde	Oscar Wilde	Manhattan Theatre Club
