= Mick Travis Trilogy =

1968–1982 British films

- Directed by: Lindsay Anderson
- Screenplay by: David Sherwin
- Story by: John Howlett (If....); Malcom McDowell (O Lucky Man!)
- Produced by: Michael Medwin (If....), (O Lucky Man!); Lindsay Anderson (O Lucky Man!); Clive Parsons (Britannia Hospital); Davina Belling (Britannia Hospital)
- Starring: Malcolm McDowell; Christine Noonan; Helen Mirren; Graham Crowden; Ralph Richardson; Leonard Rossiter; Mark Hamill; Marsha Hunt; Joan Plowright
- Cinematography: Miroslav Ondříček (If....), (O Lucky Man!); Mike Fash (Britannia Hospital)
- Edited by: David Gladwell (If....), (O Lucky Man!); Michael Ellis (Britannia Hospital)
- Music by: Marc Wilkinson (If....); Alan Price (O Lucky Man!), (Britannia Hospital)
- Distributed by: Warner Bros.
- Release dates: 5 December 1968 (If....); 20 June 1973 (O Lucky Man!); 27 May 1982 (Britannia Hospital)
- Country: United Kingdom
- Language: English

The Mick Travis Trilogy is the story of Mick Travis, a fictional character played by Malcolm McDowell in a trilogy of British films directed by English film director Lindsay Anderson and written by David Sherwin.

== Trilogy ==
=== if.... ===
if.... (1968), is Mick Travis' first appearance, and Malcom McDowell's film debut, Travis appears as a disaffected English youth that is the leader of a gang of rebellious students in a strict British boarding school. Travis' anti-establishment attitude and experiences ultimately lead to an armed insurrection at the school.

if.... was filmed at Cheltenham College, Lindsay Anderson's old school, and many of the scenes drew heavily on his experience in the Officers Training Corps at Cheltenham, which he had joined in May 1937. It also draws heavily upon Tonbridge School, where the two screenwriters both went, and several characters, including the abusive chaplain, are based on real people who taught at Tonbridge.

=== O Lucky Man! ===
O Lucky Man! (1973), cowritten by Sherwin and McDowell, is a satirical drama that starts with Travis' first job as a mobile coffee salesman after many adventures involving arms-sale scandals, experiments in human-animal genetics by the mad scientist Doctor Millar (played by Graham Crowden).

After a sojourn with musician Alan Price, O Lucky Man ends in Mick's rebirth as a film star, thanks to a slap by a film director played in a cameo by Lindsay Anderson, the scene a depiction of McDowell's first audition for if..., in which McDowell was slapped by his eventual costar Christine Noonan.

=== Britannia Hospital ===
Britannia Hospital (1982), written by Sherwin, Travis is a reporter attempting to make an investigative documentary about a hospital where Doctor Millar is continuing his unspeakable experiments as a riotous strike goes on outside.

While spying on an experiment to create a new human being from assembled body parts, Travis is captured by the hospital staff. A power failure renders the experiment's human head unusable, so Millar kills Travis and attaches his head to the creature. On being given life, the creature (played by McDowell) attacks Millar, forcing Millar to stab and dismember it.
