= Margot Bennett (actress) =

American publicist and former actress (born 1935)

- Born: Muriel Eisenberg; February 19, 1935 (age 91); Woodmere, New York, U.S.
- Education: Carnegie Mellon School of Drama (1958); Dunham School of Dance and Theatre
- Occupations: Actress, publicist
- Years active: 1957–1973
- Spouses: Keir Dullea (m. 1960; div. 1968); Malcolm McDowell (m. 1975; div. 1980)

Margot Bennett (born Muriel Eisenberg; February 19, 1935) is an American publicist and former actress who appeared in various stage, television and film roles between the years 1957 and 1973. She is best known for her appearances in the films O Lucky Man! and Who Killed Teddy Bear, and for being the first wife of both actor Keir Dullea and, later, actor Malcolm McDowell.

== Biography ==
=== Early life ===
Bennett was born Muriel Eisenberg on February 19, 1935, in Woodmere, New York. She attended Carnegie Mellon School of Drama, graduating in 1958. Prior to her graduation, she appeared (billed as Muriel Eisenberg) in various stock theatre productions, including at the Oregon Shakespeare Festival. She also studied dance at the Dunham School of Dance and Theatre in New York City.

=== Career ===
In the late 1950s and early 1960s, Eisenberg, now credited as 'Margo Bennett' or 'Margot Bennett', pursued an acting career, primarily in New York City, where she studied with Lee Strasberg. She appeared in the 1958 off-Broadway production of The Crucible, an Equity Library Theatre production of Joan of Lorraine, and in several television drama series, including Armstrong Circle Theatre, The Doctors and the Nurses, and an adaptation of Gustave Flaubert's short story "A Simple Heart" on CBS Repertoire Workshop. She also had lead roles in stock theatre productions of Gigi and The Diary of Anne Frank.

In 1963, Bennett made her Broadway debut (playing Fedra, a Greek beatnik girl) in the original cast of The Irregular Verb To Love, which ran for 115 performances. The following year, she appeared in the TV series The Defenders playing the sister of an innocent man wrongly executed for murder.

In 1965, Bennett had a supporting role in the film Who Killed Teddy Bear? as Edie Sherman, the mentally challenged sister of main character Lawrence Sherman. She did not appear in another film until 1973, when she made a brief, uncredited appearance as a Latina coffee bean picker at the beginning of O Lucky Man!, which starred her then-boyfriend and soon-to-be husband Malcolm McDowell.

By the late 1960s, Bennett was no longer acting regularly, and was instead working as a publicist for Paramount Pictures. Around the time of her wedding to McDowell in 1975, Bennett reportedly gave up her acting career in order to have an "uncomplicated long-lasting marriage".

=== Personal life ===
Bennett's first marriage was to fellow New York actor Keir Dullea on August 22, 1960. The wedding took place on a Mississippi riverboat in St. Louis, where Dullea was on location making his film debut in The Hoodlum Priest. As Dullea obtained more film roles and Bennett appeared on Broadway, the couple were forced to maintain a long-distance relationship.

In March 1969, Bennett met English actor Malcolm McDowell in the course of her job at Paramount, in which she was handling publicity duties for his first movie, If..... The two began a long-distance relationship; they later lived together for several years, during which time they both appeared in O Lucky Man! and traveled together to the 1973 Cannes Film Festival to promote the film. On April 21, 1975, Bennett and McDowell were married in London.

In 1978, while filming Time After Time in California, Malcolm McDowell met and fell in love with his co-star Mary Steenburgen. Bennett and McDowell were divorced in September 1980, after which he married Steenburgen.

Bennett subsequently lived in Los Angeles and New York City.

== Filmography (selective) ==
=== Film ===
- Who Killed Teddy Bear? (1965) ... Edie Sherman
- O Lucky Man! (1973) ... Coffee picker (uncredited)

=== Television ===
- CBS Repertoire Workshop - Season 2, "A Simple Heart" (1962) ... Virginie
- The Defenders - Season 4, Episode 7, "Turning Point" (1964) ... Maria Americus
- The Doctors and the Nurses - Season 2, Episode 26, "A Kind of Loving" (1964) ... Trudy
- NET Playhouse - Season 1, "The Irregular Verb To Love" (1967) ... Fedra
