= Robert Swann (actor) =

British actor (1945–2006)

Robert Swann

Robert Swann (18 March 1945 – 17 April 2006) was a British actor with a film career spanning thirty five years. He was also active on stage, including appearances with the National Theatre and in the West End. Born in Hampshire, he was married to actress, Susan Brodrick, from 1971 to 2006, and had three children. He is best known to American audiences through his portrayal of a Church of England vicar in the television series The Witches and the Grinnygog. He played Colonel Brandon in the 1981 Jane Austen BBC TV series Sense and Sensibility. An early film role was the sadistic house prefect of Malcolm McDowell in the 1968 film if..... His last credited acting role was in the series Wire in the Blood in 2004. He died two years later in 2006.

== Filmography ==
Year	Title	Role	Notes
1968	if....	Rowntree: Whips	
1970	Mumsy, Nanny, Sonny and Girly	Soldier	
1970	The Breaking of Bumbo	Machaffie	
1973	The Creeping Flesh	Young Aristocrat	
1975	The Sweeney	David Keel	TV series, 1 episode
1977	Anna Karenina	Konstantin Levin	TV serial, 9 episodes
1978	The Professionals	Logan-Blake	TV series, 1 episode
1980	North Sea Hijack	Miller	
1980	Hamlet, Prince of Denmark (BBC)	Horatio	
1981	Sense and Sensibility (1981 TV series)	Colonel Brandon	Seven-part series
1994	A Business Affair	Maitre d'	
1994	The Madness of King George	1st MP	Also in original stage production.
1998	Midsomer Murders	Gerald Hadleigh	TV series, 1 episode
2001	Queen's Messenger	Major Farrow	
