= A. N. Sherwin-White =

British historian and academic (1911–1993)

A. N. Sherwin-White FBA
- Sherwin-White, c. 1974
- Born: Adrian Nicholas Sherwin-White; 10 August 1911; Brentford, England
- Died: 1 November 1993 (aged 82); Fyfield, Oxfordshire, Oxfordshire, England
- Education: St John's College, Oxford
- Occupations: Roman historian Naval intelligence officer
- Employer(s): St John's College, Oxford
- Children: 2, including David Sherwin

Adrian Nicholas Sherwin-White, FBA (10 August 1911 – 1 November 1993) was a British academic and ancient historian. He was a fellow of St John's College, Oxford and President of the Society for the Promotion of Roman Studies. His most important works include a study of Roman citizenship based on his doctoral thesis, a treatment of the New Testament from the point of view of Roman law and society, and a commentary on the letters of Pliny the Younger.

== Biography ==
Adrian Nicholas Sherwin-White was born on 10 August 1911. His father, H. N. Sherwin-White, was a solicitor employed by the London County Council. From 1923 to 1930 he was educated at Merchant Taylors' School, apart from one year in which ill health forced him to study independently at home. He won a scholarship to the School's "sister foundation" St John's College, Oxford, where he began the Literae Humaniores course in 1930. His tutor in ancient history was Hugh Last, whose interest in Roman administrative history influenced the direction of his student's later scholarship. Sherwin-White achieved first-class honours in both sets of Oxford examinations, the preliminary Honour Moderations and the more important Finals which he sat in 1934.

Sherwin-White started work the same year on his doctoral thesis, on Roman citizenship. In 1935, he was awarded the Derby Scholarship and Arnold Historical Essay Prize. In 1936, he married Marie Leonora Downes. He was also selected ahead of older competitors to succeed to Last's fellowship at St John's College, despite not yet having a doctorate – this may have been on Last's recommendation. His thesis was submitted in 1937, and the examiners M. Cary and R. Syme commended its "maturity of judgement such as one hardly dares to expect from a young scholar". Sherwin-White declined to accept the actual doctorate, preferring to remain known as "Mr", but he revised the thesis for publication as The Roman Citizenship (1939). It came to be regarded as "a classic of modern historical writing on Rome".

Sherwin-White's poor eyesight kept him from active service during World War II, but the President of St John's wrote to the Director of Naval Intelligence to recommend him for a post, and he was commissioned on 4 December 1941 as a Temporary Sub-Lieutenant. He helped to edit some of the Admiralty's series of geographical handbooks, acquiring detailed geographical knowledge that he displayed in subsequent scholarship including a 1944 article about the historical geography of Algeria.

Sherwin-White returned after the War to teaching at St John's, where he also served as "Keeper of the Groves" responsible for the college garden. Outside recognition came in 1956 with his election as a fellow of the British Academy. He produced a school textbook, Ancient Rome (1959), as well as more advanced works including Roman Society and Roman Law in the New Testament (1963), identified retrospectively by the Roman historian Fergus Millar as "[t]he most stimulating and original" of his postwar works. Arising from his studies of Roman law and administration, this indicated "his conviction of the essential historicity of the narratives in the New Testament", especially in the critique he mounted in his closing pages against "form-criticism of the extremer sort".

Sherwin-White's Oxford career was not interrupted by his family's move in 1963 to a cottage near Fyfield, Oxfordshire. The year 1966 saw the publication of a work "at least eighteen years" in the making: his historical and social commentary on the letters of Pliny the Younger, the first such work ever compiled and one not yet superseded. In Millar's assessment, it "combined immense erudition, percipience and sharpness of vision with a curious slapdashness about small details"; these errors were keenly hunted down by contemporary reviewers. In the same year Sherwin-White became Reader in Ancient History. Although he was a potential choice to succeed Ronald Syme as Camden Professor of Ancient History in 1970, this role went to Peter Brunt. Sherwin-White did serve as President of the Society for the Promotion of Roman Studies between 1974 and 1977, and his Roman Foreign Policy in the East (1983) appeared four years into his retirement. He died on 1 November 1993 at Fyfield, survived by his wife and two children. His son, who adopted the professional name David Sherwin (1942-2018), was a screenwriter, most famous for the script of the cult classic If..... His daughter, Susan Sherwin-White, was an ancient historian (1945-2016), expert on the Greek islands and the Seleucid Empire.

== Publications ==
=== Books ===
- The Roman Citizenship (Oxford, 1939, revised 1973).
- Ancient Rome (London, 1959, revised 1978).
- Roman Society and Roman Law in the New Testament (Oxford, 1963, based on the Sarum Lectures for 1960–1961).
- The Letters of Pliny: A Historical and Social Commentary (Oxford, 1966).
- Racial Prejudice in Imperial Rome (Cambridge, 1967, based on the J. H. Gray lectures for 1966).
- Fifty Letters of Pliny (London, 1967, revised 1969).
- Roman Foreign Policy in the East (Norman, 1984).

=== Selected articles ===
- "Geographical Factors in Roman Algeria". The Journal of Roman Studies 34 (1944): 1–10.
- "Violence in Roman Politics". The Journal of Roman Studies 46 (1956): 1–9.
- Review of R. Syme, Tacitus. The Journal of Roman Studies 49 (1959): 140–146.
- "The Roman Citizenship: A Survey of Its Development into a World Franchise". Aufstieg und Niedergang der Römischen Welt 1.2 (1972): 23–58.
