= Henry Richardson (film editor) =

English film editor (1936–2017)

- Born: 13 January 1936; London, United Kingdom
- Died: 31 July 2017 (age 81); London, United Kingdom
- Occupation: Film editor

Henry William Richardson (13 January 1936 – 31 July 2017) was an English film editor with about 57 feature film credits. He edited five films over two decades with director Andrei Konchalovsky; their collaboration on Runaway Train (1985) earned Richardson nominations for an Academy Award and an Eddie Award.

Richardson was born and raised in the East End of London and educated at Hackney Downs School. He started working in the film industry when he left school. He got into the cutting room as a second assistant editor on Ken Annakin's The Story of Robin Hood and His Merrie Men (1952). Some of his earliest films as a film editor were A Man on the Beach (1955) directed by Joseph Losey and Ten Seconds to Hell (1959) directed by Robert Aldrich.

He went on to edit over 65 films in England, the U.S., Canada, Russia, France, Germany, Poland and Italy. Over the course of his long career, he worked with filmmakers such as Ray Harryhausen, Terence Young, Freddie Francis, Alan Hume, Ivan Tors, Ken Hughes and John Glen. He edited two James Bond films, Octopussy (1983) and A View to a Kill (1985) and seven servants by Daryush Shokof (1996).

Richardson collaborated with the Russian film and theatre director Andrei Konchalovsky on five films, including Runaway Train (starring Jon Voight), for which he was nominated for an Academy Award for Best Film Editing in 1986 and for an American Cinema Editors Eddie Award. David Parkinson wrote that Richardson's "dynamic editing gives Andrei Konchalovsky's superior direction the breakneck pace that will keep you on the edge of your seat."

He was a member of the Academy of Motion Picture Arts and Sciences (AMPAS) and the American Cinema Editors (ACE).

Henry Richardson died on 31 July 2017 in London. He is buried at Western Jewish Cemetery, Cheshunt, Hertfordshire.
