= Casanova (1971 TV series) =

1971 British television drama serial

- Created by: Dennis Potter
- Directed by: John Glenister (episodes 1, 2 and 4) and Mark Cullingham (episodes 3, 5 and 6)
- Starring: Frank Finlay; Norman Rossington; Zienia Merton
- Country of origin: United Kingdom
- No. of episodes: 6

Production
- Producer: Mark Shivas
- Running time: 326 minutes

Original release
- Network: BBC2
- Release: 16 November – 21 December 1971

Casanova is a British television drama serial, written by television playwright Dennis Potter. Directed by Mark Cullingham and John Glenister, the serial was made by the BBC and screened on the BBC2 network in November and December 1971. It is loosely based on Italian adventurer Giacomo Casanova's Histoire de ma vie (Story of My Life; 1780–1792). It was Dennis Potter's first television serial, having previously written single plays for the BBC's The Wednesday Play and Play for Today series. Frank Finlay starred in the title role and was nominated for the best actor award at the 1972 BAFTA ceremony. Like much of Potter's work, Casanova's scenes take place out of chronological order, during various times well before and well after the first scene in the series; sometimes an event in the episode will cause a flashback to an earlier period.

== Plot ==
=== Episode one: "Steed in the Stable" ===
After being arrested and charged with "foul atheism" and fornication, Casanova is sentenced to five years imprisonment at "The Leads": the most notorious of Venetian gaols. Brutalised by Lorenzo the gaoler and devoid of hope under the harsh prison regime, Casanova's mind wanders back to his past loves and adventures. He finds himself haunted by the memory of Christina, a simple country girl he gave to another rather than marry her himself.

=== Episode two: "One at a Time" ===
This episode alternates mostly between Casanova's time in prison, where he receives a new cellmate in the form of Schalon, a corrupt insurance broker, and a time after his release from prison, where he seduces three daughters at a house in Grenoble.

=== Episode three: "Magic Moments" ===
Casanova is irritated by his constantly complaining cell mate Schalon and remembers how he once pretended to be a magician casting a spell to seduce the virgin daughter of an old naive man.

=== Episode four: "Window, Window" ===
This episode switches between Casanova's time in prison, and a time after his release where he sees Robert-François Damiens tortured, and tries to seduce Anne Roman-Coupier.

=== Episode five: "Fevers of Love" ===
This episode consists mostly of scenes in prison, where Casanova is recovering from an infection, and scenes that take place after his release, in London, where he is reunited with Schalon.

=== Episode six: "Golden Apples" ===
This episode flashes back and forward between Casanova finally managing to escape from his prison cell and him trying to write his memoirs in the Castle of Duchcov near the end of his life as an old, dying man.

== Cast ==
- Giacomo Casanova - Frank Finlay
- Lorenzo - Norman Rossington
- Christina - Zienia Merton
- Barberina - Christine Noonan
- Senator Bragadin - Geoffrey Wincott
- Valenglart - David Swift
- Dr Bellotti - Basil Clarke
- Arlecchino - Tim Thomas
- Anne Roman-Coupier - Ania Marson
- Schalon - Patrick Newell
- Genoveffa - Lyn Yeldham
- Rose - Julia Cornelius
- Manon - Brigid Erin Bates
- Anna - Caroline Dowdeswell
- Helena - Elaine Donnelly
- Pantalone - Hugh Portnow
- Circospetto - Christopher Hancock
- Columbina - Rown Wylie
- Nun - Gillian Brown
- Feldkirchner - Graham Crowden
- Dr Rasp - John Ringham
- Father Balbi - Roger Hammond
- Carlo - Igo Silic
- Concertmaster - Oliver Butterworth
- Pauline - Valerie Gearon

== Production ==
In 1966, William R. Trask published the first of his 12 volume translation of Casanova's memoirs while Potter was working as a book reviewer for The Times newspaper. Potter had been after a subject for his first drama serial and found in Casanova a suitable figure to continue the themes of sex, memory and redemption that had influenced much of his previous work.

When writing the serial Potter decided not to read the story of Casanova's adventures, choosing instead to work from a list containing the names of Casanova's lovers and specific events from his life. Potter intended to explore the reason why Casanova was "driven" to have had so many sexual encounters. As a result, Potter's Casanova is far different from other interpretations of the character; he suffers from tristitia post-coitum (literally, the sadness after sex) and considers his reliance on women for sexual satisfaction a weakness. The serial includes a number of events that depart from established facts about Casanova.

== Reaction ==
The series resulted in a number of complaints to the BBC. Clean-up TV campaigner Mary Whitehouse, who regularly found fault with Potter's work, thought the first two episodes "boring" and believed the third used a kind of Playboy flashback photography. She commented to a journalist from The Glasgow Herald: "Of all the characters the BBC could have chosen to dramatise Casanova is the most ridiculous."

== Home media ==
Casanova was released on DVD by BBC Worldwide in 2004, as part of The Dennis Potter Collection, a range of Potter's work released that year.
