= Peter Jeffrey =

English actor (1929–1999)

- Jeffrey in an episode of Adam Adamant Lives!
- Born: 18 April 1929; Bristol, England
- Died: 25 December 1999 (aged 70); Stratford-upon-Avon, Warwickshire, England
- Occupation: Actor
- Years active: 1944–1999
- Spouses: Yvonne Bonnamy (m. 1955, divorced) Jill Jowett (m. 1990)
- Children: 5

Peter Jeffrey (18 April 1929 – 25 December 1999) was an English actor. Starting his performing career on stage, he later portrayed many roles in television and film.

== Early life ==
Jeffrey was born in Bristol, the son of Florence Alice (née Weight) and Arthur Winfred Gilbert Jeffrey. He was educated at Harrow School and Pembroke College, Cambridge, but had no formal training as an actor.

== Career ==
=== Theatre ===
Jeffrey spent many years on stage with the Bristol Old Vic and the Royal Shakespeare Company. From 25 May 1966 he appeared in Tango, a play by Sławomir Mrożek at the Aldwych Theatre alongside Patience Collier, Mike Pratt, Ursula Mohan and Dudley Sutton, under director Trevor Nunn.

=== Television ===
Numerous television roles include two guest appearances in Doctor Who: as the Colony Pilot in The Macra Terror (1967) and as Count Grendel in The Androids of Tara (1978). In Granada Television's daytime legal drama series Crown Court, Jeffrey played Barrister Peter Edgar QC having made a previous appearance as William Askwith Vennings in the case involving Regina v Vennings & Vennings.

He played King Philip II of Spain in the BBC serial Elizabeth R (1971) and Oliver Cromwell in By the Sword Divided (1985). He also appeared in Special Branch (1973), Thriller (1974), Porridge (1975), Some Mothers Do 'Ave 'Em (1975), Quiller (1975), Rising Damp (1978), Minder (1980), Nanny (1981), Juliet Bravo (1982), Yes Minister (1984), and Dennis Potter's Lipstick on Your Collar (1993). He played the villainous Sultan in the fantasy epic The Adventures of Baron Munchausen (1988) and appeared as Police Commissioner Blamire in Our Friends in the North (1996).

He made three appearances in The Avengers; the episodes were "Room Without A View" (1966), "The Joker" (1967) and "The Game" (1968). He featured in The New Avengers episode "House of Cards" (1976).

=== Films ===
He played the role of Headmaster in Lindsay Anderson's If..... In 1971, he played Inspector Trout in The Abominable Dr. Phibes, a role he reprised in 1972 in Dr. Phibes Rises Again. He later starred as disgraced Oxford don and psychiatric hospital inmate Ahmet in Midnight Express (1978).

== Death ==
Jeffrey died on Christmas Day in 1999 from prostate cancer.

== Filmography ==
=== Films ===
Year	Title	Role	Notes
1952	Never Look Back	Court Reporter	Uncredited
1964	Becket	Baron	
1965	The Early Bird	Fire Chief	
1966	That Riviera Touch	Mauron	
1966	A Choice of Kings	Bishop Odo	
1966	The Fighting Prince of Donegal	Sergeant	
1968	The Fixer	Berezhinsky	
1968	If....	Headmaster	
1969	Ring of Bright Water	Colin Wilcox	
1969	The Best House in London	Sherlock Holmes	Uncredited
1969	Anne of the Thousand Days	Thomas Howard, 3rd Duke of Norfolk	
1970	Goodbye Gemini	Detective Inspector Kingsley	
1971	Countess Dracula	Captain Balogh	
1971	The Abominable Dr. Phibes	Inspector Trout	
1971	The Horsemen	Hayatal	
1972	What Became of Jack and Jill?	Dr. Graham	
1972	Dr. Phibes Rises Again	Inspector Trout	
1973	O Lucky Man!	Factory chairman/Prison Governor	
1974	The Odessa File	David Porath	
1975	Deadly Strangers	Belle's Uncle	
1975	The Return of the Pink Panther	General Wadafi	
1978	Midnight Express	Ahmet	
1982	Britannia Hospital	Sir Geoffrey	
1988	The Adventures of Baron Munchausen	Sultan	

=== Television ===
Year	Title	Role	Notes
1958	The Castiglioni Brothers	Camillio	TV movie
1960	Saturday Playhouse	Major Verreker	Episode: "Conflict at Kalandi"
1963	The Spread of the Eagle	Sicinius Velutus	3 episodes
1963	First Night	Lieutenant	Episode: "Sticks"
1964	No Hiding Place	Horatio	Episode: "It's Coming Down Harder"
1964-5	The Plane Makers	James Cameron-Grant MP	8 episodes
1964-5	The Saint	George Marring/Quincy	2 episodes
1964-7	ITV Play of the Week	Various	4 episodes
1965	Public Eye	Harry Lawford	Episode: "You Have to Draw the Line Somewhere"
1965	Cluff	Reader	Episode: "The Convict"
1965-9	Armchair Theatre	Marsden/Kenneth	2 episodes
1965-7	The Wednesday Play	Various	4 episodes
1966	The Liars	Cadi	1 episode
1966	Adam Adamant Lives!	Sinoda	Episode: "Beauty is an Ugly Word"
1966	Dixon of Dock Green	DI Carter	2 episodes
1966-8	The Avengers	Various	3 episodes
1966-73	BBC Play of the Month	Various	4 episodes
1967	Drama 61-67	Mr. Irtin	Episode: "Mr Irtin"
1967	Softly, Softly	Duke	Episode: "The Linkman"
1967	The Revenue Men	Milo Benedict	Episode: "Fox in the High Street"
1967	NET Playhouse	Muspratt/Bishop Odo	2 episodes
1967-8	Theatre 625	The Baron/Thompson	2 episodes
1967-71	The Troubleshooters	Heritage/Marlin	2 episodes
1967-78	Doctor Who	Pilot/Count Grendel	Serials: "The Macra Terror and "The Androids of Tara"
1968	Dr. Finlay's Casebook	Craig	Episode: "Conscience Clause"
1968	Frontier	Captain Rankin-Keogh	Episode: "Duel of Honour"
1968-1979	ITV Playhouse	Various	4 episodes
1969	Chronicle	Thomas Becket	Episode: "Becket"
1969	Out of the Unknown	Masham Cresswell	Episode: "Get Off My Cloud"
1969	Strange Report	Superintendant Shaw	Episode: Report 8319 - GRENADE: 'What Price Change?'
1970	Villette	Paul Emmanuel	5 episodes
1970-5	The Main Chance	Hugh Neville/Kenneth Manmer	2 episodes
1971	The Expert	Cedric Lambert	Episode: "Cedric"
1971	Elizabeth R	King Philip II of Spain	2 episodes
1971-8	Play for Today	Various	4 episodes
1972	The Onedin Line	McPherson	Episode: "Cry of the Blackbird"
1972	The Shadow of the Tower	The Prisoner	Episode: "The Serpent and the Comforter"
1972	Dead of Night	Wisbech	Episode: "Two in the Morning"
1972-8	Crown Court	Various	5 serials
1973	The Adventurer	Rymans	Episode: "Full Fathom Five"
1973	Barlow at Large	DS Miller	Episode: "Review"
1973	Special Branch	Pettiford	Episode: "A Copper Called Craven"
1973	Harriet's Back in Town	Ronnie Graham	2 episodes
1973	New Scotland Yard	Chief Supt. Piggott	Episode: "Exchange is No Robbery"
1974	The Water Margin	English Dub	Episode: "A Foolish Sage Who Got Involved"
1974	The Protectors	Police Inspector	Episode: "Blockbuster"
1974	Bedtime Stories	Nethercoat	Episode: "Jack and the Beanstalk"
1974	Napoleon and Love	Tallyrand	7 episodes
1974	Thriller	Dexter	Episode: "Come Out, Come Out Wherever You Are"
1974	Marked Personal	Harry Baker	2 episodes
1974	Cakes and Me	Alroy Kear	3 episodes
1975	The Sweeney	Det. Supt. Pringle	Episode: "Thin Ice"
1975	Jackanory Playhouse	Atticus the Bandit Chief	Episode: "The Jo-Jo Tree "
1975	Survivors	Knox	Episode: "Garland's War"
1975	Quiller	Colonel Hythe	Episode: "The Thin Red Line"
1975	Porridge	Mr. Wainwright	Episode: "Disturbing the Peace"
1975	Some Mothers Do 'Ave 'Em	Hayes	Episode: "Learning to Drive"
1976	Jackanory	Storyteller	Story: "In the Grip of the Lemon Fever"
1976	Bill Brand	Maidstone	Episode: "August for the Party"
1976	The New Avengers	Ivan Perov	Episode: "House of Cards"
1977	London Belongs to Me	Henry Squales	Miniseries
1978	Rumpole of the Bailey	Sam Dogherty	Episode: "Rumpole and the Alternative Society"
1978	Rising Damp	Ambrose	Episode: "Under the Influence"
1978	The Famous Five	Mr. Wooh	Episode: "Five Are Together Again"
1979	Omnibus	Father	Episode: "Worlds Fail Me"
1980	Spy!	Ambassador Ott	Episode: "Tokyo Ring"
1980	Minder	Clive	Episode: "A Nice Little Wine"
1981	BBC Television Shakespeare	Parolles	Episode: All's Well That Ends Well
1981	Nanny	Capt. Robert Charlesworth	Episode: "Trompe LOeil"
1981	Bognor	Milburn Port	7 episodes
1982	Tales of the Unexpected	Mr. Stewart	Episode: "The Skeleton Key"
1982	Juliet Bravo	Detective Superintendent Nuttall	Episode: "Cause for Complaint"
1984	The Jewel in the Crown	Mr. Peabody	Episode: "The Division of the Spoils"
1984	Yes Minister	Eric	Episode: "Party Games"
1984-5	One by One	Maurice Webb	
1985	By the Sword Divided	Oliver Cromwell	6 episodes
1985	Lace II	Nicholas Cliff Sr.	TV movie
1985	The Last Place on Earth	Lord Curzon	3 episodes
1987	Screen Two	Henry Windscape	Episode: "Quartermaine's Terms"
1987	Bergerac	Rockwell	Episode: "Treasure Hunt"
1988	You Must Be the Husband	Clifford Unsworth	Episode: "Alice and Her Yorkshire Pudding"
1989	ScreenPlay	Rev. Mendel of Riminov	Episode: "The Night of Simhat Torah"
1989	Chelworth	Michael Hincham	Minisereries
1989	The Nightmare Years	Norman Ebbutt	4 episodes
1990	Hands of a Murderer	Mycroft Holmes	TV movie
1990	Theatre Night	William Combe	Episode: "Bingo: Scenes of Money and Death"
1993	Lovejoy	Geoffrey Connaught	Episode: "Judgment of Solomon"
1993	The Detectives	Derek	Episode: "Acting Constables"
1993	Lipstick on Your Collar	Col. Bernwood	Miniseries
1994	Middlemarch	Nicholas Bulstrode	Miniseries
1995	A Village Affair	Peter Morris	TV movie
1996	Rasputin	Bishop Hermogones	TV movie
1996	The Treasure Seekers	Wentworth	TV movie
1996	Paul Merton in Galton and Simpson's...	Judge	Episode: "Twelve Angry Men"
1996	The Bill	Harry Hedges	Episode: "Hedging Your Bets"
1996	Our Friends in the North	Colin Blamire	3 episodes
1996	The Prince and the Pauper	The Duke of Norfolk	Miniseries
1996	The Moonstone	Mr. Bruff	2 episodes
1997	Breakout	Prof. Bannerman	TV movie
1997	The Tale of Sweeney Todd	Dr. Maxwell	TV movie
1997-8	Knight School	Sir Hubert Grindcobbe	3 episodes
1998	Heartbeat	Mr. Ryle	Episode: "Where There's a Will"
1999	Kavanagh QC	Sir Ronald Tibbitt	Episode: "Endgame"
1999	Where the Heart Is	Ronnie Lyons	Episode: "Expansions"
1999	The Scarlet Pimpernel	Marquis de Rochambeau	Episode: "Valentin Gautier"
