= Susan Brodrick =

British actress

- Born: Susan M. Brodrick; 27 March 1945 (age 81); Hampstead, London, England
- Years active: 1966–1981
- Spouse: Robert Swann (1971–2006; his death)

Susan Brodrick is a British actress who was active between 1966 and 1981. She is best known for roles in the films Blowup (1966) and Private Road (1971). She was married to British actor Robert Swann from 1971 until his death in 2006; they had three children.

Brodrick made her acting debut with an uncredited role in the cult film Blowup as an antique shop owner. She went on to have a 21-credit career, mostly starring as extras and small parts before her penultimate role in Tony Bagley's Enemy (1976) in which she played the lead character, Marigold. After her final role in the 1981 TV movie The Winter's Tale, she receded from the public eye.
