= Who Killed Teddy Bear? =

1965 neo-noir film by Joseph Cates

- Theatrical release poster
- Directed by: Joseph Cates
- Screenplay by: Arnold Drake; Leon Tokatyan
- Story by: Arnold Drake
- Produced by: Everett Rosenthal
- Starring: Sal Mineo; Juliet Prowse; Jan Murray; Elaine Stritch
- Cinematography: Joseph Brun
- Edited by: Angelo Ross
- Music by: Charles Calello
- Production company: Phillips Productions
- Distributed by: Magna Corporation; BijouFlix Releasing
- Release date: December 8, 1965
- Running time: 94 minutes
- Country: United States
- Language: English

Who Killed Teddy Bear? is a 1965 American neo-noir crime thriller film, directed by Joseph Cates and starring Sal Mineo, Juliet Prowse, Jan Murray and Elaine Stritch. The film was written by Arnold Drake and Leon Tokatyan. The film follows a New York City discotheque hostess who is stalked by a sexual predator. Though it contains no nudity, the movie touches on taboo topics such as pornography, voyeurism, incest, and lesbianism. It also became notable for showing Times Square and 42nd Street in its seedier era.

The film’s cult reputation grew over the years and in 1996, it was given a limited theatrical re-release. In 2009, the film was released on home media for the first time by British company Network Releasing. The company gave the film a Blu-ray transfer in 2018.

== Plot ==
Norah Dain, a nightclub disc jockey and aspiring actress living alone in a Manhattan apartment, receives a series of obscene phone calls from someone who seems to be watching her on a daily basis. She also finds a decapitated teddy bear in her apartment. A police detective, Lt. Dave Madden, whose own wife was raped and murdered, takes a personal interest in Norah and her case. Lt. Madden engages in suspicious behavior such as suggesting to Norah several times that he himself could be the caller, secretly recording his discussions with Norah, listening to tapes of Norah and other women talking about obscene phone calls, and obsessively studying pornography and the behavior of sex perverts, despite the fact that he is exposing his ten-year-old daughter to such adult concepts and he is being reported to his superiors at work.

The obscene caller is seen to be Lawrence Sherman, a waiter at the nightclub where Norah works. Lawrence lives with and cares for his 19-year-old sister Edie, who is brain damaged and has the mind of a child. Edie's brain damage is apparently the result of an accident when she was a little girl and saw her older brother, Lawrence, having sex with an older woman (implied to be his mother); she ran away in horror or fear and fell down the stairs. Lawrence is unable to have a normal romantic or sexual relationship due to his guilt over the accident and his duty to look after Edie following the death of their parents. He is also frustrated when Edie dresses up in an adult dress, high heels and makeup and seems to make advances towards him. He tries to get rid of his frustration by visiting adult bookstores and movies in Times Square, but still is obsessed with watching and calling Norah. Despite Lt. Madden's warnings that the caller might be someone Norah knows, Norah does not suspect Lawrence until it is too late. Instead, she is friendly to him and even attracted to him, complimenting him on his body when they meet at the gym, and offering to stay late after work to teach him to dance.

Marian Freeman, the older, experienced manager of the nightclub where Norah and Lawrence work, also takes a personal interest in Norah and tries to advise and protect her. She offers to stay overnight with Norah at her apartment so Norah will not be alone and afraid. While Marian is visiting, Norah receives yet another telephone call and starts to cry. Marian consoles her, but Norah senses that Marian is actually making a lesbian pass at her and, revolted, asks her to leave the apartment immediately. Marian leaves in a huff, still wearing Norah's coat, which she had been using as a bathrobe. Outside, Lawrence sees Marian leaving (wearing Norah's coat), and mistaking her for Norah, he chases after her and kills her.

Lawrence attacks Norah after closing time in the empty nightclub and rapes her, but does not kill her. Lt. Madden, who has just figured out that Lawrence was watching Norah through the reflection of a mirror, arrives too late to prevent the rape. He beats Lawrence and then, inexplicably, lets him leave the club. Lawrence runs through traffic in Times Square, imagining that he is running through Central Park towards a welcoming Norah. Police officers chase him and ultimately gun him down as the film ends.

== Cast ==
- Sal Mineo as Lawrence Sherman
- Juliet Prowse as Norah Dain
- Jan Murray as Lt. Dave Madden
- Elaine Stritch as Marian Freeman
- Margot Bennett as Edie Sherman
- Daniel J. Travanti as Carlo (credited as Dan Travanty)
- Diane Moore as Pam Madden
- Frank Campanella as Police Captain
- Bruce Glover as Frank
- Tom Aldredge as Adler
- Rex Everhart as Rude Customer
- Alex Fisher as Michel
- Stanley Beck as Sutter
- Casey Townsend as Ms. Nielsen

== Production ==
The co-writer of the screenplay was Arnold Drake, who would go on to co-create the Guardians of the Galaxy comics. Director Joseph Cates envisioned the film as a noir thriller that was meant to appeal to the exploitation crowd.

Mineo, playing against type as the antagonist, hoped that the film would re-start his career after aging out of the types of roles that made him famous. A scene of the film required Mineo's character to imply he was masturbating, but no nudity could be shown due to censors. Thus, Mineo had to wear jockey shorts, and the actor remarked, "It turned out that was the first American film where a man wore jockey shorts on-screen."

Set in New York City, the film was shot on location in Manhattan and features footage of Times Square.

== Release and reception ==
Although Mineo's performance was praised, the film received negative reviews. Box Office said, "Mineo's performance in an unsavory role is superior to the tone of the picture." Author and film critic Leonard Maltin awarded the film one and a half out of four stars, calling it "sleazy" and "a waste of talent".

In the UK, the film was refused a certificate from the British Board of Film Classification. The Catholic Church also called for a boycott of the film.

In 1996, Who Killed Teddy Bear was theatrically released in select theaters. In January 2010, the film was given a limited run at the Anthology Film Archives in New York City. The opening night screening was introduced by Owen Kline, the grandson of director Joseph Cates.

In a retrospective review, Anton Bitel of Channel 4 wrote: "The film’s sexual panic captures perfectly the mood between the repressive 1950s and the liberated 1970s – and for those with an interest in cinema history, Teddy Bear represents an important missing link between, on the one hand, Peeping Tom (1960), Psycho (1960), and the nascent Italian giallo genre, and on the other hand, Black Christmas (1974), Taxi Driver (1976), and the American slasher genre."

The film holds a 100% rating on Rotten Tomatoes based on six reviews.

== Home media ==
In 2009, Network Releasing released Who Killed Teddy Bear on DVD for the first time in the UK. On September 17, 2018, Network would also release the film on Blu-ray and VOD.

For its 2024 Black Friday sales event, Vinegar Syndrome, via its Cinématographe sub-label, announced an Ultra HD Blu-ray release featuring a new 4K restoration of the film, restoring 3 minutes of material which had previously been edited from the film following its US premiere showings.
