= Mary MacLeod (actress) =

Scottish actress (1937-2016)

- Born: Mary Katrina Anne MacLeod; 6 July 1937; Wednesbury, Staffordshire, England
- Died: 7 June 2016 (aged 78)
- Occupation: Actress
- Years active: 1956–2003
- Spouse: Michael Buckley (m. 1961; died 2008)
- Children: 3

Mary Katrina Anne MacLeod (6 July 1937 – 7 June 2016) was an English-born Scottish actress who performed on the stage and in film and television productions of the United Kingdom. Born in Wednesbury to Scottish parents, she debuted in theatre in 1956 and had her first British cinema role in the Lindsay Anderson film if.... (1968). MacLeod continued to feature in minor roles until her career was ended early by a stroke in 2003.

== Biography ==
MacLeod was born in Wednesbury on 6 July 1937. She was the second of four children to the Scottish coach builder John MacLeod, who moved from the Isle of Lewis to England for work reasons, and his wife Mary (née Canavan). She was raised in Birmingham, and educated at the Pelsall Senior School in Walsall. There, MacLeod became passionate about drama from an early age, joining a local amateur dramatics group. She also attended Birmingham School of Speech Training and Dramatic Art after earning a drama scholarship upon leaving school and going into the workplace in 1952. MacLeod continued to act during the evenings after becoming an English and drama teacher at a school in Darlaston, Staffordshire.

She made her theatre début when she performed at the Birmingham Repertory Theatre from 1956 to 1957. MacLeod established a close relationship with the actor Nicol Williamson and she produced a radio recording for the BBC in 1960. She later moved to London to further her career and met the director Lindsay Anderson when she appeared as a school secretary in a play called Miniatures by David Creagan at the Royal Court Theatre in 1965. Three years later, Anderson and the Royal Court's casting director gave her the role of Mrs Kemp in the drama film if.... (1968). It was MacLeod's first film credit and the British Board of Film Censors (now the British Board of Film Classification) agreed to include a scene where she walked down a school corridor completely nude on the condition that shots of male genitalia from a shower scene were removed. It made her the first actress to appear fully naked in a film shown in the British cinema. She later recalled feeling quite nervous in rehearsals due to not being on stage for a long period of time.

MacLeod returned to work with Anderson in the comedy film O Lucky Man! (1973) and portrayed multiple roles, including a landlady who seduced Malcolm McDowell's coffee sales representative and the wife of a vicar. That year, she also played a nurse in the drama play Equus. MacLeod later appeared in several television roles, such as June Wade in the Play for Today "Headmaster" (1974), Norah Trotter in an episode of The Duchess of Duke Street (1976) and a series-wide role as Becky Clegg in People Like Us (1978). In 1981, she played Ursula in Much Ado About Nothing and played a nurse in Brideshead Revisited. MacLeod was cast as Valerie Holdsworth in the film version of Brimstone and Treacle (1982), and visited Scotland to film the television series Taggart in the following year. From 1985 to 1986, she played the busybody and flustered gossip Diva Plaistow in the Channel 4 period comedy-drama series Mapp and Lucia.

Later roles in MacLeod's career were Venus Peter (1989), Doctor Finlay in the episode "The Greatness and the Power" (1985), the double bill Blue Heart at the Edinburgh Festival Fringe in 1997 with which she toured internationally, the film The House of Mirth (2000), Ivy Lomas in the television drama Harold Shipman: Doctor Death (2002), and voiced Nanny in the direct-to-video film, 101 Dalmatians II: Patch's London Adventure (2003).

== Personal life ==
MacLeod married the teacher turned school inspector Michael Buckley in 1961 and the couple had a child who died at the age of two. She is survived by twins Alison and Sandy. Her husband Michael predeceased her in 2008.

In 2003 MacLeod suffered a stroke that ended her career and she died on 7 June 2016.
