= Malatesta (film) =

1970 film

- Directed by: Peter Lilienthal
- Written by: Michael Koser; Peter Lilienthal; Heathcote Williams
- Produced by: Manfred Durniok
- Starring: Eddie Constantine
- Cinematography: Willy Pankau
- Edited by: Brigitta Kliemkiewicz; Annemarie Weigand
- Release date: 1970
- Running time: 80 minutes
- Country: West Germany
- Language: German

Malatesta is a 1970 German drama film directed by Peter Lilienthal and starring Eddie Constantine. It was entered into the 1970 Cannes Film Festival. It contains some biographical aspects of the life and thoughts of the Italian anarchist Errico Malatesta.

== Cast ==
- Eddie Constantine as Malatesta
- Christine Noonan as Nina Vassileva
- Vladimír Pucholt as Gardstein
- Diana Senior as Ljuba Milstein
- Heathcote Williams as Josef Solokow
- Wallas Eaton as The Priest (as Wallace Eaton)
- Sheila Gill as Mrs. Gershon
- Sigi Graue as Fritz Svaars (as Siegfried Graue)
- Peter Hirsche as Cafiero
