= Michael Medwin =

British actor (1923–2020)

Michael Medwin OBE
- Born: Michael Hugh Medwin; 18 July 1923; London, England
- Died: 26 February 2020 (aged 96); Bournemouth, England
- Occupations: Actor, film producer
- Years active: 1940–2008
- Spouse: Sunny Sheila Back (m. 1960; div. 1971)

Michael Hugh Medwin (18 July 1923 – 26 February 2020) was an English actor and film producer.

== Life and career ==
Medwin was born in London. He was educated at Canford School, Dorset, and the Institute Fischer, Montreux, Switzerland. He first appeared on stage in 1940.

Medwin's West End theatre credits include Man and Superman, The Rivals, Love for Love, Duckers and Lovers, Alfie, St Joan of the Stockyards, and What the Butler Saw. At the National Theatre he played a season which included Weapons of Happiness (Ralph Makepeace), Volpone (Corvino) and The Madras House. He appeared in Black Ball Game at the Lyric Hammersmith. He also played Lloyd Dallas in one of the casts of the long-running production of Noises Off in the early 1980s.

He is probably best known for his role as radio boss Don Satchley in the BBC television detective series Shoestring, as well as for playing Scrooge's nephew Harry in the film version of Scrooge, a musical based on Charles Dickens' A Christmas Carol, and for his role in The Army Game, a British television comedy series of the late 1950s and early 1960s. With Bernard Bresslaw, Leslie Fyson and Alfie Bass, he took the theme tune from The Army Game into the UK Singles Chart in 1958, where it peaked at number 5.

As well as his role in Shoestring, he played Colin's boss Mr Langley (of the Langley Book of Horror) in the Mel Smith comedy series Colin's Sandwich. In 1961, Medwin played the lead named Michael in BBC Radio Light Programme comedy series about an advertising company called Something to Shout About. In the same year he was the lead role in all 26 episodes of the comedy series Three Live Wires.

He made many film appearances, taking a leading role as Ginger Edwards in the 1953 Guy Hamilton film The Intruder, for which one critic wrote that Medwin "gives a brilliant study of a good fellow gone wrong." Others included Carry On Nurse (1959) and The Longest Day (1962), before turning to producing films. Among the films he produced for Memorial Enterprises, a company he established with actor Albert Finney, are Charlie Bubbles (1967), directed by Finney, and Lindsay Anderson's If.... (1968), which won the Palme d'Or at the Cannes Film Festival. He worked again with Anderson on O Lucky Man! (1973), continuing the story of the Mick Travis character from their earlier film. Medwin has been quoted many times as saying "I knew at a young age I was going to be an actor: acting has always been in my bones". He also said that Charles Laughton and Edward G. Robinson were the two biggest influences in his life of acting, and considered that being appointed OBE (Officer of the Order of the British Empire) in the 2005 Queens Birthday Honours List for Services to Drama the single greatest thing that ever happened to him.

As a play producer, his work includes Spring and Port Wine, Alpha Beta, A Day in the Death of Joe Egg, Forget Me Not Lane and Another Country. Medwin formed with David Pugh in 1988, David Pugh Limited, a West End and Broadway theatrical production company, of which he remained chairman until his death on 26 February 2020.

== Selected filmography ==
- Piccadilly Incident (1946) as Radio operator (uncredited)
- The Root of All Evil (1947) as Minor Role (uncredited)
- The Courtneys of Curzon Street (1947) as Edward Courtney Jr
- Black Memory (1947) as Johnnie Fletcher
- An Ideal Husband (1947) as Duke of Nonesuch
- Night Beat (1947) as Rocky
- Anna Karenina (1948) as Kitty's Doctor
- Call of the Blood (1948) as Medical student (uncredited)
- Just William's Luck (1948) as Spiv
- My Sister and I (1948) as Charlie
- Woman Hater (1948) as Harris
- Look Before You Love (1948) as Emile Garat
- Another Shore (1948) as Yellow
- William Comes to Town (1948) as Reporter
- Operation Diamond (1948) as Sullivan
- Forbidden (1949) as Cabby
- The Queen of Spades (1949) as Hovaisky
- For Them That Trespass (1949) as Len, Herbie's bar pal
- Helter Skelter (1949) as Man Giving BBC Boxing Talk (uncredited)
- Trottie True (1949) as Monty. Marquis of Maidenhead
- Boys in Brown (1949) as Alf 'Sparrow' Thompson
- Children of Chance (1949)
- Someone at the Door (1950) as Ronnie Martin
- Trio (1950) as Steward (in segment Mr. Know-All)
- The Lady Craved Excitement (1950) as Johnny
- Shadow of the Past (1950) as Dick Stevens
- The Long Dark Hall (1951) as Leslie Scott
- Four in a Jeep (1951) as Sergeant Harry Stuart
- Curtain Up (1952) as Jerry Winterton
- Love's a Luxury (1952) as Dick Pentwick
- Miss Robin Hood (1952) as Ernest
- Top Secret (1952) as Smedley
- Hindle Wakes (1952) as George Ackrody
- Street Corner (1953) as Chick Farrar
- Genevieve (1953) as Father to be (uncredited)
- The Oracle (1953) as Timothy Balke
- Malta Story (1953) as Ramsey, CO 'Phantom' Squadron (uncredited)
- Spaceways (1953) as Dr. Toby Andrews
- The Intruder (1953) as Ginger Edwards
- Bang! You're Dead (1954) as Bob Carter
- The Green Scarf (1954) as Teral
- The Teckman Mystery (1954) as Martin Teckman
- The Harassed Hero (1954) (uncredited)
- Above Us the Waves (1955) as Smart
- Doctor at Sea (1955) as Sub-lieutenant Trail
- A Man on the Beach (1955) as Max
- Charley Moon (1956) as Alf Higgins
- A Hill in Korea (1956) as Pvt. Docker
- Checkpoint (1956) as Ginger
- Doctor at Large (1957) as Dr. Charles Bingham
- The Steel Bayonet (1957) as Lt. Vernon
- The Duke Wore Jeans (1958) as Cooper
- The Wind Cannot Read (1958) Officer Lamb
- I Only Arsked! (1958) as Cpl. Springer
- The Heart of a Man (1959) as Sid
- Carry On Nurse (1959) as Ginger
- Crooks Anonymous (1962) as Ronnie Bassett
- The Longest Day (1962) as Pvt. Watney
- It's All Happening (1963) as Max Catlin
- Kali Yug: Goddess of Vengeance (1963) as Capt. Walsh
- The Mystery of the Indian Temple (1963) as Capt. Walsh
- Night Must Fall (1964) as Derek
- Rattle of a Simple Man (1964) as Ginger
- I've Gotta Horse (1965) as Hymie Campbell
- 24 Hours to Kill (1965) as The Crew: Tommy Gaskell
- The Sandwich Man (1966) as Sewer Man
- A Countess from Hong Kong (1967) as John Felix
- Privilege (1967) as Jackman (uncredited)
- Spring and Port Wine (1970) as Driver at Traffic Lights (uncredited)
- Scrooge (1970) as Nephew Fred
- O Lucky Man! (1973) as Army Captain / Power station Technician / Duke of Belminster
- Law and Disorder (1974) as Man in Cab
- Pogled in potkrovlija (1976) as Ian Faulkner
- The Sea Wolves (1980) as Radcliffe
- Britannia Hospital (1982) as Theatre Surgeon
- The Jigsaw Man (1983) as Milroy
- Never Say Never Again (1983) as Doctor at Shrublands
- Sleepwalker (1984) as Waiter
- Hôtel du Paradis (1986) as English Producer
- Just Ask for Diamond (1988) as The Professor
- The Fool (1990) as Mr. Wells
- Staggered (1994) as Sarah's Father
- Alice Through the Looking Glass (1998) as Red King
- Fanny and Elvis (1999) as Registrar
- The Duchess (2008) as Speechmaker
- Framed (2008) as Dr. Louie Farraday (final film role)

== Awards ==
Michael Medwin was awarded an O.B.E. (Officer of the Order of the British Empire) in the 2005 Queen's Birthday Honours List for his services to drama.
