= Christine Noonan =

British actress

Christine Noonan

Christine Noonan (born Christine Elizabeth Wright; 8 March 1945 – 6 August 2003) was a British actress. She is best remembered for her role as the anarchist love interest of Mick Travis (Malcolm McDowell) in the film If.... (1968). In one scene, which gained particular notice in British cinema of the time, she impersonated a tiger and had sex with McDowell's character on the floor of a cafe, which with the later violence in the film resulted in an X rating, leading Paramount to later cut the sexual content from the film. Noonan said of the scene in the film: "He was stark naked and I was stark naked, but we were both so busy fighting that I can't remember what he looked like in the nude". Her husband initially protested when he learned of the nature of the role, but he agreed to her appearing in it once she explained the point of the film and the context.

Noonan also appeared opposite McDowell in two minor roles in the sequel to If...., O Lucky Man! (1973), and also appeared in the films Oh! What a Lovely War (1969), Malatesta (1970) and Backwoods (1987). She found work on the stage in the 1970s, performing in George Etherege's comedy She Would If She Could for the Nuffield Theatre Company at Lancaster University in 1972. Noonan played the brief role of Barberina in Dennis Potter's TV serial Casanova (1971); her scene is repeated multiple times during the six episodes.

Noonan was often out of work as an actress and worked selling wool in an Army and Navy store. She was married twice; first to Denis Noonan, and later to Lawrence Dennett, with whom she had three children. She died in 2003, aged 58, from cancer.

== Filmography ==
Year	Title	Role	Notes
1968	if....	The Girl: Crusaders	
1969	Oh! What a Lovely War	Mill Girl	Uncredited
1970	Malatesta	Nina Vassileva	TV movie
1973	O Lucky Man!	Coffee Trainee / Mavis	
