= Britannia Hospital =

1982 British film by Lindsay Anderson

- Theatrical release poster
- Directed by: Lindsay Anderson
- Written by: David Sherwin
- Produced by: Clive Parsons; Davina Belling
- Starring: Leonard Rossiter; Graham Crowden; Joan Plowright; Jill Bennett; Marsha Hunt; Malcolm McDowell; Mark Hamill
- Cinematography: Mike Fash
- Edited by: Michael Ellis
- Music by: Alan Price
- Production companies: EMI Films; British Lion Films
- Distributed by: Columbia-EMI-Warner Distributors
- Release date: 27 May 1982
- Running time: 116 minutes
- Country: United Kingdom
- Language: English
- Budget: £2,494,210
- Box office: under £50,000 (in UK) £444,000 (overseas) (figures at 31 May 1983)

Britannia Hospital is a 1982 British black comedy film, directed by Lindsay Anderson, which targets the National Health Service and contemporary British society. It was entered into the 1982 Cannes Film Festival and Fantasporto.

Britannia Hospital is the final part of Anderson's Mick Travis Trilogy of films, written by David Sherwin, that follow the adventures of Mick Travis (portrayed by Malcolm McDowell) as he travels through a strange and sometimes surreal Britain. From his days at boarding school in if.... (1968) to his journey from coffee salesman to film star in O Lucky Man! (1973), Travis's adventures finally come to an end in Britannia Hospital, which sees him as a muckraking reporter investigating the bizarre activities of Professor Millar, played by Graham Crowden, with whom he had had an encounter in O Lucky Man. All three films have characters in common. Some of the characters from if.... that did not turn up in O Lucky Man! return for Britannia Hospital. The film also features Leonard Rossiter, Joan Plowright, Jill Bennett, Marsha Hunt, Fulton Mackay, Vivian Pickles, Richard Griffiths, Arthur Lowe (in his final film appearance), and Mark Hamill.

The absurdities of human behaviour as we move into the twenty-first century are too extreme—and too dangerous—to permit us the luxury of sentimentalism or tears. But by looking at humanity objectively and without indulgence, we may hope to save it. Laughter can help.

— Lindsay Anderson

== Plot ==
A new wing at Britannia Hospital is to be opened, and the Queen is due to arrive. The administrator of the hospital, Potter, is confronted with demonstrators protesting against an African dictator who is a VIP patient, striking ancillary workers (opposed to the exotic gastronomic demands of the hospital's private patients) and a less-than-cooperative Professor Millar, the head of the new wing. Rather than cancel the royal visit, Potter decides to go out and reason with the protestors. He strikes a deal with the protest leader—the private patients of Britannia Hospital are to be ejected and, in return, the protestors allow some ambulances into the hospital. Unknown to the protestors, these ambulances contain the Queen Mother and her entourage.

Mick Travis is a reporter who is shooting a clandestine documentary about the hospital and its dubious practices. He manages to get inside with the help of a sympathetic nurse and starts to investigate Millar's sinister scientific experimentation, including the murder of a patient, Macready. As mayhem ensues outside, Travis is also murdered and his head used as part of a grim Frankenstein-like experiment which goes hideously wrong.

Eventually, the protestors break into the hospital and attempt to disrupt Millar's presentation of his Genesis Project, in which he claims he has perfected mankind. In front of the audience of royalty and commoners, Genesis is revealed—a brain wired to machinery. Genesis is given a chance to speak and, in a robotic voice, utters the "What a piece of work is a man" speech from Hamlet, until it continuously repeats the line "How like a God".

== Cast ==
The Administration

- Leonard Rossiter as Vincent Potter
- Brian Pettifer as Biles
- John Moffatt as Greville Figg
- Fulton Mackay as Chief Superintendent Johns
- Vivian Pickles as Matron
- Barbara Hicks as Miss Tinker

Medicos

- Graham Crowden as Professor Millar
- Jill Bennett as Dr. MacMillan
- Peter Jeffrey as Sir Geoffrey
- Marsha Hunt as Nurse Amanda Persil
- Mary MacLeod as Casualty Sister

The Unions

- Joan Plowright as Phyllis Grimshaw
- Robin Askwith as Ben Keating
- Dave Atkins as Sharkey

The Media

- Malcolm McDowell as Mick Travis
- Mark Hamill as Red
- Frank Grimes as Sammy / Voice of "Genesis"

The Palace

- Gladys Crosbie as Queen Elizabeth the Queen Mother
- Marcus Powell as Sir Anthony Mount
- John Bett as Lady Felicity

And

- Richard Griffiths as Cheerful Bernie
- Arthur Lowe as hospital patient
- Alan Bates as Macready
- Dandy Nichols as Florrie
- Betty Marsden as Hermione
- Liz Smith as Maisie
- T. P. McKenna as Theatre Surgeon
- Michael Medwin as Theatre Surgeon
- Roland Culver as General Wetherby
- Valentine Dyall as Mr Rochester
- Tony Haygarth as Fraser
- John Gordon Sinclair as Gregory
- Brian Glover as Painter
- Mike Grady as Painter
- Kevin Lloyd as Picket
- Robert Pugh as Picket

Robbie Coltrane, Patsy Byrne and Edward Hibbert had bit parts. This was the final film appearance of Arthur Lowe, who died shortly after his scenes were filmed.

== Production ==
=== Development ===
Lindsay Anderson says the film had its origins in 1975 with a newspaper story about the "siege of Charing Cross Hospital, when there was a big demonstration against fee-paying private patients led by a union official known as Granny Brookstern. This immediately struck me as absurd. If you stand outside a hospital and stop ambulances going in in the name of humanity you are involved in a wonderfully absurd paradox. The story got even more wild with accusations that Granny Brookstern and the Labour Minister of Health had themselves been private patients; and so I started building up a private scrapbook of newsworthy absurdities."

Anderson said he was inspired by Amiel's theory that the only true principle of humanity is justice. "The man who would today say that liberty and equality are bad principles is a brave man but perhaps a necessary one since, unless they include justice, they are pernicious and self-destructive. That is at the heart of Britannia Hospital, though I hope it's not a preachy film but a parable. A parable is a heavenly story with an earthly meaning. I hope this is an earthly story with a heavenly meaning."

Anderson did an outline and sent it to Lew Grade, who was not interested. 20th Century Fox under Sandy Lieberson signed Anderson to a two-picture deal, of which one was to be Britannia Hospital. (The other was to be Dress Grey written by Gore Vidal). Anderson arranged for David Sherwin to write a script.

Sherwin said the film was not "about a hospital at all. It's about everything. It's not even a film that's just about Britain."

Lieberson left Fox and the studio dropped the project. Mamoun Hassan of the National Film Finance Corporation said he thought they were "too shocked by it".

After this, producer Clive Parsons championed the project. The cost of production prior to striking prints and paying for publicity was recorded as £2,494,210 - £1,305,137 came from Thorn EMI, £450,000 from the National Film Finance Corporation, and the balance of £738,873 from Thorn EMI as a cost overrun. EMI was then under Barry Spikings.

Hassan says that there was discussion at the NFFC whether they should support a film by Anderson, who had made a number of movies, but ultimately decided he was an "outsider". Hassan attributes the fact that the budget was raised to Parsons's persistence, and the fact the script had been around a number of years so some of the shock had "worn off". Nonetheless, he called it "a risk... a very black comedy."

=== Shooting ===
Filming started in August 1981. It was filmed at Shepperton Studios, using Friern Hospital in Barnet as the exterior of the hospital in October 1981. The film was reported to have 81 speaking roles and was to be shot in 12 weeks. McDowell said he did the film just for his expenses, and no fee, because there was not enough money in the budget to pay his normal fee, and he wanted to work with Anderson again. Mark Hamill also did the part free plus expenses when original choice Treat Williams bowed out. During filming, Anderson needed another $1 million and two extra weeks to finish the film. Anderson said:

The film ends with a question mark, not a solution, and people don't like that. They want to be let off the hook, and this film impales the audience on rather a large hook. I think that if we are going to find solutions, we're not going to get any help from God, or any pre-sold political notions. The big question remains whether we are good enough or intelligent enough to survive.

== Release ==
It was released in the United Kingdom on 27 May 1982.

=== Box office ===
The film was a commercial flop earning less than £50,000 in the UK and £440,000 overseas which included a cable sale of £203,000.

=== Critical reception ===
Most British critics lambasted the film on release, although Dilys Powell reviewed it positively, David Robinson listed it among his top ten for the year, and Geoff Daniel chose it as his film of the year. Critic Ian Haydn Smith considers Britannia Hospital the "nadir" of Anderson's career. "Replacing satire with broad comedy, the film fails on every level in its attempt to critique the state of the National Health Service".

Conversely, American critic Vincent Canby writing for The New York Times felt, "Britannia Hospital, Mr. Anderson's best film to date, is far more successfully integrated than the two preceding satires. Though the subject is national exhaustion, the effect is immensely bracing."

Some have attempted to reappraise the film in reference to Anderson's previous work, addressing themes such as spectatorship, politics and authoritarianism.

The film won the 1982 "Audience Jury Award" at Fantasporto.

Filmink called the movie "amazing" but noted it was "very dark, with no characters to empathise with."

=== Home media ===
Britannia Hospital was released in the United Kingdom on Blu-ray Disc for the first time on 29 June 2020 under Powerhouse Films. Special features include an audio interview with Anderson, separate new interviews with actors Pettifer and Askwith, interview with film editor Michael Ellis and theatrical trailers.

== Notes ==
- Izod, John (2012). Lindsay Anderson : cinema authorship. Manchester University Press.
- Houston, Penelope (Autumn 1981). "A Minor Major". Sight and Sound. Vol. 50, no. 4. p. 244-253.
