= A Man on the Beach =

1955 film

- Directed by: Joseph Losey
- Screenplay by: Jimmy Sangster (screenplay) (based on a story) Chance at the Wheel by Victor Canning
- Produced by: Anthony Hinds
- Starring: Donald Wolfit; Michael Medwin; Michael Ripper
- Cinematography: Wilkie Cooper
- Edited by: Henry Richardson
- Music by: John Hotchkis
- Production company: Hammer Film Productions
- Distributed by: Exclusive Release
- Release date: 1955
- Running time: 29 minutes
- Country: United Kingdom
- Language: English

A Man on the Beach is a 1955 British fiction colour featurette directed by Joseph Losey and starring Donald Wolfit, Michael Medwin and Michael Ripper. It was produced by Anthony Hinds for Hammer Films and written by Jimmy Sangster (his first script) adapted from a story "Chance At the Wheel" by Victor Canning.

== Plot ==
An old lady is driven to a Mediterranean casino by an un-named chauffeur in a Rolls-Royce. After briefly playing at the tables without success, the lady visits the manager, played by Alex Gallier. While toasting her loyalty to the casino with champagne, the manager is attacked by the old lady, and his takings are stolen.

In reality, the old "lady" is career criminal Max, and the chauffeur is his accomplice on his first job. Journeying into the countryside they stop for Max to change into male clothing. The chauffeur is alarmed when Max reneges on their agreement to divide the stolen money and pulls a gun on him, instead. But Max is accidentally injured when it fires while they fight. With the unconscious chauffeur slumped over the wheel, Max kills him by pushing the car off a cliff. Looking for assistance, Max stumbles across the empty house occupied by the reclusive Carter, a blind alcoholic, and former doctor. Returning shortly afterwards, he discovers his unwanted guest, and the two men talk and drink, though Carter does not reveal his loss of sight, nor Max realise it. He thinks Carter is unwilling to look at his bleeding arm, and uses whisky as disinfectant on his wound. He later passes out.

When he comes around the following morning, he finds his wound treated, Carter absent, and that his bag has been examined. He assumes Carter has gone to the police when he sees Carter's policeman-friend arriving by car. Carter asks him to leave. Whilst threatening to shoot him, Max fills in most of the remaining details of his crime because he assumes he is able to identify him. They struggle, and Max is disarmed. As Carter is unable to find the gun, Max finally realises the other man is blind. Carter's policeman friend arrives as usual to take him fishing, only to have Max hand the day's catch, Max, over to him, instead.

== Cast ==
- Donald Wolfit as Carter
- Michael Medwin as Maxie
- Michael Ripper as chauffeur
- Alex de Gallier as casino manager
- Edward Forsyth as Sergeant Clement
- Shandra Walden as little girl
- Kirk S. Siegenburg as little boy
- Barry Shawzin as American
- Corinna Grey as blonde
- Nora Maiden as blonde

== Reception ==
The Monthly Film Bulletin wrote: "Beginning promisingly with a neat robbery and the criminal changing his petticoats for the safety of trousers, this short story film loses much of its tension by letting the final twist, Carter's blindness, become obvious from the moment he appears on the screen. Donald Wolfit's rather sullen playing does not help this. The colour is pleasant and the use of the wide screen adroit."

Kine Weekly wrote: "Michael Medwin and Donald Wolfit fill the roles of crook and sawbones respectively and subtly amplify the playlet's irony."

Halliwell's Film and Video Guide gives the film no stars, calling it a "modest featurette which scarcely justifies its credits.

David Caute in his study of Losey writes that viewing the film "is a misfortune – its twenty nine minutes weigh like sixty" whose "dialogue and action are equally amateurish, inconsistent, awful. Everything is spelled out, usually several times."

Wheeler Winston Dixon wrote: "Immaculately photographed by Wilkie Cooper, this peculiar and atmospheric caper film ... offers an interesting hint as to Losey's future direction in British cinema."

== See also ==
- Hammer filmography
