= David Sherwin =

British screenwriter

- Born: David Sherwin-White; 24 February 1942; Oxford, Oxfordshire, UK
- Died: 8 January 2018 (aged 75); United Kingdom
- Occupation: Screenwriter
- Spouses: Gay Conolly (????-1974); Monika Hayden (1977-2017)
- Children: 2
- Relatives: A. N. Sherwin-White (father)
- Writing career
- Language: English
- Genres: Screenwrting, memoir
- Notable works: if.... O Lucky Man! Britannia Hospital

David Sherwin-White (24 February 1942 – 8 January 2018) was a British screenwriter best known for his collaborations with director Lindsay Anderson and actor Malcolm McDowell on the films if.... (1968) (for which Sherwin was nominated for a BAFTA Award for Best Screenplay), O Lucky Man! (1973) and Britannia Hospital (1982).

Sherwin attended Tonbridge School, which provided much of the inspiration for the content of if.....

In 1996, Sherwin published a memoir, Going Mad in Hollywood: And Life with Lindsay Anderson, (Andre Deutsch) ISBN 978-0-233-98966-2. A film of the memoir was planned by the director Michael Winterbottom, with Malcolm McDowell cast as Anderson, but never materialised.

He was the son of Oxford historian A. N. Sherwin-White.
