= O Lucky Man! =

1973 British film by Lindsay Anderson

- Theatrical release poster
- Directed by: Lindsay Anderson
- Screenplay by: David Sherwin
- Based on: An original idea by Malcolm McDowell
- Produced by: Lindsay Anderson; Michael Medwin
- Starring: Malcolm McDowell; Ralph Richardson; Rachel Roberts; Arthur Lowe; Helen Mirren; Dandy Nichols; Mona Washbourne
- Cinematography: Miroslav Ondříček
- Edited by: David Gladwell
- Music by: Alan Price
- Production company: Memorial Enterprises
- Distributed by: Warner Bros.
- Release date: 20 June 1973
- Running time: 184 minutes
- Country: United Kingdom
- Language: English

O Lucky Man! is a 1973 British surrealist comedy-drama fantasy film directed by Lindsay Anderson and starring Malcolm McDowell as Mick Travis, whom McDowell had first played as a disaffected public schoolboy in his first film performance in Anderson's if.... (1968). O Lucky Man! is the second film in the Mick Travis Trilogy, all starring McDowell, concluding with Britannia Hospital (1982).

== Plot ==
The film is prefaced by a short story that begins "Once Upon a Time", a silent, black-and-white film that depicts an unnamed country filled with peasant labourers. They pick coffee beans while armed foremen push rudely between them. One worker pockets a few beans for himself ("Coffee for the Breakfast Table"), but he is discovered by a foreman. He is next seen before a fat magistrate who slobbers as he removes his cigar only to say "Guilty." The foreman draws his machete and lays it across the unfortunate labourer's wrists, bound to a wooden block. The machete rises and falls, and the labourer draws back in a silent scream. The scene blacks out and the title "NOW" appears onscreen and quickly expands to fill it.

Michael Arnold "Mick" Travis working as a coffee salesman, works for Imperial Coffee in North East England. He is seduced by the firm's human resources manager. He travels to a hotel in the north east, where a tailor gifts him a golden suit, and he sleeps with the hotel manager. While there, he's told to travel to Scotland as part of his job. He loses his way, and is arrested and tortured in a government installation. He's made to sign a confession, which makes it seem that he's been working for a foreign power for three years. The installation comes under what seems like a military attack, and he escapes through a burnt and blasted landscape. Coming across a church celebrating the harvest festival, he's found eating the harvest offerings by the vicar's wife, who instead offers him her breast to suckle on. She then gives him directions ('go south; there's nothing in the north for a boy like you').

Hitching a lift to London, he's offered £150 to participate in research at a private medical clinic. On arrival, he learns that they intend to sterilise him. He hides in the room of another patient, who he finds has had his head transplanted onto a pig’s body. He jumps from a window, and catches a lift with a band who are heading for London. He meets Patricia, who takes him back to the band's flat.

In parallel with Travis's experiences, the narration shows 1960s Britain slowly retreating from its imperial past but retaining some influence by means of corrupt dealings with the foreign dictators of countries that had recently fought for their independence. After finding out his girlfriend Patricia is the daughter of Sir James Burgess, an evil industrialist, Travis is appointed Burgess' personal assistant. Burgess is allied with President Munda, the dictator of Zingara (a fictional African country), who has created a brutal police state and playground for wealthy people from the developed world. Burgess sells the regime a chemical called "PL45 'Honey'", which the dictator sprays on rebel areas; its effects resemble those of napalm. When public outcry goes international, Burgess conspires to convict Travis of fraud. Travis is imprisoned for five years.

Five years later Travis has finished his sentence, become a model prisoner, and converted to humanism. He is quickly faced with a bewildering series of assaults upon his new-found idealism. While stopping at a slum on the outskirts of London he finds out that Patricia and her wealthy husband — whom Patricia married for financial stability while cheating on him with Travis — have lost all of their money and are living in extreme poverty. Travis' misadventures culminate in him being attacked by down-and-outs he had been trying to help.

Becoming despondent and wandering the streets, the now-destitute Travis inadvertently becomes involved in a casting call for a film production. He is given various props to handle, including a stack of schoolbooks and a Bren light machine gun. The director believes he has found the protagonist for his new film in Travis, but when asked to smile for his screen test Travis, failing to understand what is being asked of him, is befuddled and repeatedly asks why he should smile since he feels he has no reason to do so. Suddenly, the director slaps Travis with his script book, and Travis, having an epiphany, slowly begins to smile. After a cut to black Travis, wearing the golden suit, is shown dancing at a raucous party, which includes all of the film's cast celebrating and finally balloons descending from the ceiling.

== Cast ==
Many of the actors play several roles.

- Malcolm McDowell as Michael Arnold "Mick" Travis / Plantation Thief
- Ralph Richardson as Monty / Sir James Burgess
- Rachel Roberts as Gloria Rowe / Madame Paillard / Mrs. Richards
- Arthur Lowe as Mr. Duff / Charlie Johnson / President Munda
- Helen Mirren as Patricia / Casting Call Receptionist
- Graham Crowden as Dr. Millar / Professor Stewart / Meth Drinker
- Dandy Nichols as Tea Lady in Military Installation
- Peter Jeffrey as Factory chairman / Prison Governor
- Mona Washbourne as Neighbour / Usher / Sister Hallett
- Philip Stone as Jenkins / Interrogator / Salvation Army Major
- Mary MacLeod as Mrs. Ball / Salvationist / Vicar's Wife
- Wallas Eaton as John Stone (Coffee Factory) / Col. Steiger / Prison Warder / Meths Drinker / Film Executive
- Warren Clarke as MC at Wakefield Club / Warner / Male Nurse
- Bill Owen as Superintendent Barlow / Inspector Carding
- Michael Medwin as Army captain / Power station technician / Duke of Belminster
- Vivian Pickles as Good Lady
- Geoffrey Palmer as Examination Doctor / Basil Keyes
- Christine Noonan as Imperial Coffee Assembly Line Worker / Mavis at Wakefield Club
- Geoffrey Chater as Bishop / Vicar
- Anthony Nicholls as General / Judge
- James Bolam as Attenborough / Examination Doctor
- Brian Glover as Plantation Foreman / Bassett
- Brian Pettifer as Biles
- Edward Judd as Oswald
- Alan Price as Himself
- Jeremy Bulloch as Crash victim / Experimental Patient / Sign Guy
- Ben Aris as Mr. MacIntyre / Dr. Hyder / Flight Lt. Wallace
- Margot Bennett as Coffee Picker
- Anna Dawson as Becky
- Lindsay Anderson (uncredited) as Film Director

== Production ==
The film originally began as a script written by McDowell about his experiences as a coffee salesman in his late teens and early 20s. Anderson was unhappy with this treatment, and David Sherwin worked on the script. Sherwin though was undergoing personal problems at the time, which necessitated Anderson writing a few scenes himself, a skill he did not feel he had. Anderson found working with Czech cinematographer Miroslav Ondříček much less rewarding than he had on if..... He also doubted his own skills as a director during the film's making, and felt that the film had insufficient preparation. The role of Patricia was recast during production. Originally, Fiona Lewis, best known for appearing in several horror films around this time, played the role. The film features a large number of British actors and actresses who were either already famous, or who were to become famous subsequently. A plot device that is employed throughout the film has several actors featured in different roles.

Britannia Hospital (1982) completes the trilogy of films featuring Mick Travis, which also sees the return of Dr. Millar.

== Soundtrack ==
Professional ratings
Review scores
Source	Rating
Christgau's Record Guide	B−

Alan Price said Lindsay Anderson wanted to make a documentary about Price and his band touring England, but the cost of licensing songs they performed was too high. As Sherwin and McDowell developed the script, Anderson decided Price should write the score and sent him the script, indicating where he would like songs to appear. Price wrote nearly all the songs before filming started. Anderson conceived of Price's role as a kind of Greek Chorus, both commenting on and finally appearing as part of the action.

The soundtrack was released as a vinyl album, by Warner Bros. Records, in 1973. In the U.S., it entered the Top LPs & Tape chart on 11 August 1973, and spent 14 weeks on the chart, peaking at no. 117.

The score won the 1974 BAFTA Award for Best Film Music.

=== Track listing ===
1. "O Lucky Man!"
2. "Poor People"
3. "Sell Sell"
4. "Pastoral"
5. "Arrival"
6. "Look Over Your Shoulder"
7. "Justice"
8. "My Home Town"
9. "Changes"
10. "O Lucky Man!"

The song "O Lucky Man!" has lyrics that mirror the fable from the Pasolini's film Uccellacci e uccellini – The Hawk and the Sparrows. "Takers and fakers and talkers won't tell you. Teachers and preachers will just buy and sell you. When no one can tempt you with heaven or hell- You'll be a lucky man!" says the bird.

The song "Changes" (based on the tune to "What a Friend We Have in Jesus") was later a chart hit for Price in April 1988 when it was used in a television advertisement of the same name for Volkswagen Golf cars in 1987, starring model Paula Hamilton. The song "Sell Sell" was recorded by Widespread Panic for their twelfth studio album Street Dogs.

=== Charts ===
Chart (1973/74)	Peak position
Australia (Kent Music Report)	34
United States (Billboard 200)	117

== Release ==
The film was entered into the 1973 Cannes Film Festival.

=== Versions ===
A number of different edits exist, with some American prints removing around twenty minutes including the working class parody suicide, just before the conclusion of the film. Even both British VHS releases delete at least one scene present in the BBC broadcast of the film (Travis testing his status in the home of his industrialist patron) in the early eighties. The original editor's cut was 183 minutes, but the distributor demanded a shorter version. The cinema release was 168 minutes, achieved by accidentally missing "roll 16" during an editing session.

=== Home media ===
A 2-disc special edition Region 1 DVD, including commentary by Malcolm McDowell, David Sherwin and Alan Price, and the feature-length documentary O Lucky Malcolm!, was released by the Warner Bros. on 30 October 2007.

== Reception ==
On Rotten Tomatoes 80% of reviews from 20 critics reviews were positive with an average rating of 7.7 out of 10.

Some critics consider this film one of the best British films ever.

In a negative review for Creem in 1973, Robert Christgau said, "How does an acerbic, good-humored music journeyman like Price (find: This Price is Right, on Parrot) fall in with a pompous, overfed con man like Lindsay Anderson? By playing the Acerbic, Good-Humoured Music Journeyman Symbol in a pompous, overfed movie. Two or three deft political songs do not redeem an LP that runs under 25 minutes despite filler. It figures—the movie is an hour (or three hours) too long."

Vincent Canby of The New York Times rated it 2 out of 4 and wrote: "Staying with it through its almost three-hour running time becomes increasingly nerve-racking, like watching superimposed images that never synchronize. The result does not match the ambition of the intention. The wit is too small, too perfunctory, for the grand plan of the film and the quality of the production itself."

Reviewing the film for BFI in May 2024, Stephen Dalton said:

An anarchic joyride through the tragicomic horrorscape of early 1970s Britain, Lindsay Anderson's maximalist musical satire O Lucky Man! has lost little of its disturbing, lurid, carnivalesque power in the half century since it was released. Part bawdy farce, part picaresque road movie, part sprawling state-of-the-nation sermon, this boldly experimental three-hour pageant stars Malcolm McDowell alongside a stellar ensemble cast of British screen stalwarts. ... A heady cocktail of Brecht and Buñuel, Lewis Carroll and Monty Python, Jean-Luc Godard and Ken Russell, O Lucky Man! still contains plenty to delight, shock and disgust 21st century audiences. Admittedly some elements have dated exceptionally badly, especially the Carry On-style depiction of women as pliant nymphomaniacs, and the jarring spectacle of beloved Dad's Army star Arthur Lowe in full blackface (a decision that would have been unremarkable in 1973, when The Black and White Minstrel Show was still a high-rating BBC fixture). Despite this, the film's rich combination of cynicism and romanticism, jaunty music and bitingly absurd humour, can still feel fresh and spiky today, with its proto-punk contempt for bourgeois good taste.
