= Never Apologize =

- Directed by: Mike Kaplan
- Written by: Malcolm McDowell
- Produced by: Malcolm McDowell; Mike Kaplan
- Starring: Malcolm McDowell
- Distributed by: Warner Bros.
- Release date: 2007
- Running time: 112 minutes

Never Apologize is a 2007 documentary film of actor Malcolm McDowell's one man show about his experiences working with film director Lindsay Anderson.

On review aggregator website Rotten Tomatoes the film has an approval rating of 67% based on 12 critics, with an average rating of 6/10.
