= Mick Travis =

- First appearance: If....; 1968
- Last appearance: Britannia Hospital; 1982
- Created by: David Sherwin
- Portrayed by: Malcolm McDowell

In-universe information
- Species: Human
- Gender: Male
- Occupation: Coffee salesman
- Weapon: Bren light machine gun
- Origin: England, UK
- Nationality: British

Michael Arnold "Mick" Travis is a fictional character played by Malcolm McDowell in the Mick Travis Trilogy, three films directed by British film director Lindsay Anderson and written by David Sherwin. Travis features not so much as a single character with a character arc, but as an everyman character whose role changes according to the needs of the storyteller.

In If.... (1968), his first appearance – and McDowell's film debut – Travis first appears as a disaffected public school boy whose anti-establishment attitude and experiences lead to armed insurrection at the school. The film was made at Cheltenham College, Lindsay Anderson's old school, and many of the scenes drew heavily on his experience in the Officers Training Corps at Cheltenham, which he had joined in May 1937. It also draws heavily upon Tonbridge School, where the two screenwriters both went, and several characters, including the abusive chaplain, are based on real people who taught at Tonbridge.

In O Lucky Man! (1973), cowritten by Sherwin and McDowell, Travis becomes a picaresque character, often compared to Voltaire's Candide, in a satirical drama that starts with Travis' first job as a mobile coffee salesman and, after many adventures involving arms-sale scandals, experiments in human-animal genetics by the mad scientist Doctor Millar (played by Graham Crowden), and a sojourn with the musician Alan Price, ends in his rebirth as a film star, thanks to a slap by a film director played in a cameo by Anderson—the scene was a depiction of McDowell's first audition for If..., in which McDowell was slapped by his eventual costar Christine Noonan.

In Britannia Hospital (1982), written by Sherwin, Travis is a reporter attempting to make an investigative documentary about a hospital where Doctor Millar is continuing his unspeakable experiments. While spying on an experiment to create a new human being from assembled body parts, Travis is captured by the hospital staff. A power failure renders the experiment's human head unusable, so Millar kills Travis and attaches his head to the creature. On being given life, the creature (played by McDowell) attacks Millar, forcing Millar to stab and dismember it.
