= Graham Crowden =

Scottish actor (1922–2010)

- Born: Clement Graham Crowden; 30 November 1922; Edinburgh, Scotland
- Died: 19 October 2010 (aged 87); Edinburgh, Scotland
- Occupation: Actor
- Years active: 1956–2008
- Spouse: Phyllida Hewat (m. 1952)
- Children: 4, including Sarah

Clement Graham Crowden (30 November 1922 – 19 October 2010) was a Scottish actor. He was best known for his many appearances in television comedy dramas and films, often playing eccentric scientist, teacher and doctor characters.

== Early life ==
Crowden was born on 30 November 1922 in Edinburgh, the third of four children of University of Edinburgh-educated schoolmaster Harry Graham Crowden (d. 1938) and Anne Margaret (née Paterson). He was educated at Clifton Hall School and the Edinburgh Academy. He served briefly in the Royal Scots Youth Battalion of the army until he was injured in an accident. During arms drill he was shot by his platoon sergeant, when the sergeant's rifle discharged. The sergeant reportedly enquired "What is it now, Crowden?", to which Crowden replied "I think you've shot me, sergeant." He later found work in a tannery.

His sister, Anne Crowden, was a world-renowned classical musician and founder of the Crowden Music School in Berkeley, California, which has rich history of prominent graduates, faculty, and board members.

== Acting career ==
Crowden had a long theatrical career, most notably at Laurence Olivier's National Theatre where he performed as The Player King in Rosencrantz and Guildenstern Are Dead, a play by Tom Stoppard.

He occasionally played mad scientists in film, taking the role of Doctor Millar in the Mick Travis films of director Lindsay Anderson, O Lucky Man! (1973) and Britannia Hospital (1982) and also playing the sinister Doctor Smiles in the film of Michael Moorcock's first Jerry Cornelius novel, The Final Programme (1973). Crowden also played the eccentric history master in Anderson's if.... (1968). In 1970, Crowden appeared in the popular Thames Television series Callan as The Groper, a de-registered doctor, who had been in Wormwood Scrubs called on by Callan, when unofficial medical assistance was required (e.g. Series 3, "A Village Called G", and probably others between 1967 and 1973, though some are now lost).

In 1975, he made an appearance in "No Way Out" – an episode of the British sitcom Porridge alongside Ronnie Barker, Brian Wilde, Richard Beckinsale and Fulton Mackay, as the prison doctor when Fletcher was complaining of an injured leg.

He was offered the role of the Fourth Doctor in Doctor Who in 1974, when Jon Pertwee left the role but turned it down, informing producer Barry Letts that he was not prepared to commit himself to the series for three years. Crowden's potential hiring was the reason why Ian Marter was originally hired for a role, as the producers and directors considered Crowden too old to be seen running about and taking on a larger physical role. The role of the Doctor ultimately went to Tom Baker. Crowden appeared in The Horns of Nimon (1979–80) as a villain opposite Baker.

A regular role was in the BBC comedy-drama A Very Peculiar Practice (1986–1988) as the alcoholic Dr Jock McCannon. In 1990, he appeared as a lecherous peer in the BBC comedy Don't Wait Up and in 1991 he played a modest role in the Rumpole of the Bailey episode "Rumpole and the Quacks", playing Sir Hector MacAuliffe, the head of a medical inquest into the potential sexual misconduct on the part of Ghulam Rahmat (played by Saeed Jaffrey).

In 1990, he landed the role of Tom Ballard in the sitcom Waiting for God, opposite Stephanie Cole's character Diana Trent, as the two rebellious retirement home residents. The show ran for five years and was a major success. In 1994, Crowden played the part of Professor Pollux in the BBC TV adaptation of the John Hadfield novel Love on a Branch Line. Crowden then voiced the role of Mustrum Ridcully in the 1997 animated Cosgrove Hall production of Terry Pratchett's Soul Music.

In 2001, he guest-starred in the Midsomer Murders episode "Ring Out Your Dead" and also played The Marquis of Auld Reekie in The Way We Live Now. Between 2001 and 2002, he played a role in the BBC Radio 4 comedy series The Leopard in Autumn. In 2003, he made a cameo as a sadistic naval school teacher in The Lost Prince. In 2005–2008, he starred in the Radio 4 sci-fi comedy Nebulous as Sir Ronald Rolands. In 2008, he appeared as a guest star in Foyle's War.

== Death ==
For many years in later life, Crowden lived in Mill Hill, London. Crowden died on 19 October 2010 in Edinburgh after a short illness, survived by his wife, Phyllida Hewat, whom he married in 1952, a son and three daughters, one of whom, Sarah Crowden, followed him into acting.

== Filmography ==
=== Television roles ===
Year	Title	Role	Notes
1956	David Copperfield	Mr. Gulpidge	
1957	Nicholas Nickleby	Mr. Pyke	
1958	Charlesworth at Large	Landlord	
1964	HMS Paradise	Commander Shaw	
1964	Redcap	Major Fraser	Episode: "The Patrol"
1965	Danger Man	Commander Braithwaite	Episode: "That's Two Of Us Sorry"
1965	Edgar Wallace Mysteries	Murchie	Episode: "Dead Man's Chest
1965	The Sullavan Brothers	Mr. Cullinane	
1970	Catweazle	Gobbling	Episode: "The Enchanted King"
1971	The Guardians	The Dirtiest Man	Episode: "The Dirtiest Man in the World"
1971	Casanova	Feldkirchner	Episode six: "Golden Apples"
1972	His and Hers	Bobbie Beresford	Episode: "Come Back"
1973	The Adventures of Black Beauty	Mr. Crevace	Episode: "Goodbye Beauty"
1974	Father Brown	Colonel Bohun	Episode: "The Hammer of God"
1975	Porridge	Prison Physician	Christmas Special – "No Way Out"
1977	1990	Dr. Sondeberg	Episode: "Decoy"
1977	Raffles	Sir Arthur Rumbold	Episode: "Home Affairs"
1979–1980	Doctor Who	Soldeed	"The Horns of Nimon"
1982	The Brack Report	Max Challen	
1983	Agatha Christie's Partners in Crime	Colonel Kingston Bruce	"The Affair of the Pink Pearl"
1985	Bleak House	Lord Chancellor	
1986–1988	A Very Peculiar Practice	Dr. Jock McCannon	
1986	All Passion Spent	Herbert	
1987	Screen Two	Headmaster	Episode: "East of Ipswich"
1990–1994	Waiting for God	Tom Ballard	All 47 episodes
1991	Rumpole of the Bailey	Sir Hector MacAuliffe	Episode: "Rumpole and the Quacks"
1992	The Alleyn Mysteries	Sir Henry Ancred	Episode: "Final Curtain"
1994	Love on a Branch Line	Professor Pollux	
1996	Gulliver's Travels	Professor of Politics	
2000	The 10th Kingdom	Elderly elf	
2001	Dr. Terrible's House of Horrible	Professor MacLewton	Episode: "Curse of the Blood of the Lizard of Doom"
2001	The Way We Live Now	The Marquis of Auld Reekie	
2002	Midsomer Murders	Reggie Barton	Episode: "Ring Out Your Dead"
2007	Waking the Dead	Sir Cyril Barrett	Episode: "Deus ex Machina"
2008	Foyle's War	Sir John Sackville	Episode: "Broken Souls"

=== Film roles ===
Year	Title	Role	Notes
1959	The Bridal Path	Man Giving Directions to the Beach	Uncredited
1961	Don't Bother to Knock	Scoutmaster	Uncredited
1962	We Joined the Navy		Uncredited
1965	One Way Pendulum	Prosecuting Counsel / Caretaker	
1966	Morgan - A Suitable Case for Treatment	Counsel	
1968	If....	History Master: Staff	
1969	The File of the Golden Goose	Smythe	
1969	The Virgin Soldiers	Medical Officer	
1970	Leo the Last	Max	
1970	The Rise and Rise of Michael Rimmer	Bishop of Cowley	
1971	Percy	Alfred Spaulton	
1971	The Night Digger	Mr. Bolton	
1972	Something to Hide	Lay Preacher	
1971	Up the Chastity Belt	Sir Coward de Custard	
1972	The Ruling Class	Kelso Truscott	
1972	The Amazing Mr Blunden	Mr. Clutterbuck	
1973	O Lucky Man!	Stewart / Prof. Millar / Meths Drinker	
1973	The Final Programme	Dr. Smiles	
1974	The Abdication	Cardinal Barberini	
1974	The Little Prince	The General	
1974	Romance with a Double Bass	Count Alexei	
1975	The New Spartans		
1977	Hardcore	Lord Yardarm	
1977	Jabberwocky	Fanatics' Leader	
1977	Three Dangerous Ladies	The Butler	(segment "The Island")
1981	For Your Eyes Only	First Sea Lord	
1982	Britannia Hospital	Professor Millar	
1982	The Missionary	The Reverend Fitzbanks	
1984	The Company of Wolves	Old Priest	
1985	Code Name: Emerald	Sir Geoffrey Macklin	
1985	Out of Africa	Lord Belfield	
1988	A Handful of Dust	Mr. Graceful	
1996	The Innocent Sleep	George	
1998	The Sea Change	Chairman of The Board	
1998	I Want You	Old Man	
2002	Possession	Sir George	
2003	Calendar Girls	Richard	
