= Oceanus: Act One =

- Directed by: Jeffrey Morris
- Written by: Jeffrey Morris; Kimberly Morris
- Produced by: Anne Marie Gillen; Jeffrey Morris; Eli Sasich
- Starring: Sharif Atkins; Bruce Davison; Megan Dodds; Malcolm McDowell
- Cinematography: Greg Cotten
- Edited by: Sherwood Jones; Jeffrey Morris
- Music by: Jeff Rona
- Production companies: FutureDude Entertainment; Evolutionary Films
- Release date: 7 July 2015 (United States)
- Running time: 35 minutes
- Country: United States
- Language: English

Oceanus: Act One is a 2015 American adventure, science-fiction short film which is a prequel to the planned film Oceanus: Odyssey One created by Jeffrey Morris.

== Synopsis ==
On 13 September 2029, there is a large underwater base called Oceanus which houses 300 Scientists and Engineers. Sam, an engineer, and Erin, a marine biologist and Sam's wife, go on a mission to release a pod on the surface of the water, which emits whale songs. However, during the mission there is an issue with their backup power system in the pod, which Sam goes to look at, while Erin stays in the submarine. A tsunami hits, sweeping Erin away from the pod. She loses radio contact with Sam.

Erin takes the ship to the surface and sees the sky is on fire. She contacts Mitch Conrad, a commander at the Oceanus base, he reports the base has suffered damage from earthquakes. He surmises that there has been a big natural disaster and advises Erin to return to the base. However, she decides to go and look for Sam, plotting the direction of the tsunami to work out where he might be. She goes looking for him and passes a large passenger plane which has sunk into the ocean.

Erin realizes she can use the whale songs emitted from the pod to find it. She finds the pod, and speaks to Sam on the radio, he is coughing and sounds injured. She docks onto the pod and opens the door. She gets Sam into the submarine. The submarines oxygen level is low, so they have to get back to the base quickly. They activate the auto pilot and use the spare oxygen tanks for air. They think they have seen the end of the world...

== Cast ==
- Sharif Atkins as Sam Jordan, a ship pilot and engineer.
- Bruce Davison as Commander Mitch Conrad, a Commander of the Oceanus base.
- Megan Dodds as Dr. Erin Kendall, a Marine Biologist.
- Malcolm McDowell as Triton, the ship's computer.

== Reception ==
The Continuing Voyage gave the film a positive review and Spoilerfreemovies gave the film a score of 8/10. Best Movies Guide also gave the film a positive review.
