= The Caller (1987 film) =

- Video release poster
- Directed by: Arthur Allan Seidelman
- Written by: Michael Sloan
- Produced by: Frank Yablans; Charles Band (exec.)
- Starring: Malcolm McDowell; Madolyn Smith
- Cinematography: Daniele Nannuzzi
- Edited by: Bert Glatstein
- Music by: Richard Band
- Distributed by: Empire Pictures
- Release dates: May 1987 (Cannes); December 27, 1989 (U.S.; video)
- Running time: 97 minutes
- Country: United States
- Language: English

The Caller is a 1987 mystery thriller film starring Malcolm McDowell and Madolyn Smith, distributed independently by Empire Pictures. The film appears at first to be a straightforward story about a man wanting to use a girl's telephone, but things are not as they seem. Similar to a stage play, it is set in a primary location with only two actors. The film was shot in the Lazio region of Italy.

Special effects were supervised by John Carl Buechler, known for his long list of film credits including Friday the 13th Part VII: The New Blood, A Nightmare on Elm Street 4: The Dream Master, and Re-Animator.

== Plot ==
A mysterious man ("The Caller") joins a woman ("The Girl") in a forest cabin. The Caller initially claims that his car has broken down and he needs to use her telephone. Things quickly become suspicious as they examine each other's stories for inconsistencies. The Girl claims that she caused the accident to lure the man up so she can kill him. The man claims that he is a police officer, investigating the possibility that the woman has killed her own family.

Neither claim stands up well to scrutiny. The climax reveals that the situation is actually a weekly experiment (similar to an escape room), where "points" are awarded to the Girl for finding flaws in the Caller's story. The reward for obtaining 50 points (which is nearly impossible) is to be freed from the experiment.

An altercation occurs, and The Caller is shocked by an electrical outlet, revealing its robotic endoskeleton. The Caller reveals that one thousand parents remain in "the experiment", separated from their children as motivation. The Girl sprints to the temporarily unprotected perimeter in the woods, but is distracted by echoing calls from her child. A second Caller appears to recapture the Girl, mock her attempt, and "start over" the experiment.

== Cast ==
- Malcolm McDowell as The Caller
- Madolyn Smith Osborne as The Girl (credited as Madolyn Smith)

== Release ==
Originally intended for a theatrical release, the film was only shown at the 1987 Cannes Film Market and the 1987 MystiFest in Italy. On December 27, 1989, the film was finally released in the United States on videocassette by Trans World Entertainment. MGM released a manufactured-on-demand DVD-R of the film on March 15, 2011.

In July 2020, Vinegar Syndrome announced that they were set to release a new scan of the original film print, on Blu-ray for the first time.
