= If.... =

1968 British satirical surrealist psychological drama film by Lindsay Anderson

- British cinema poster
- Directed by: Lindsay Anderson
- Screenplay by: David Sherwin
- Story by: David Sherwin; John Howlett
- Produced by: Lindsay Anderson; Michael Medwin
- Starring: Malcolm McDowell; Richard Warwick; Christine Noonan; David Wood; Robert Swann
- Cinematography: Miroslav Ondříček
- Edited by: David Gladwell
- Music by: Marc Wilkinson
- Production company: Memorial Enterprises
- Distributed by: Paramount Pictures
- Release dates: 5 December 1968 (London Film Festival); 19 December 1968 (London)
- Running time: 111 minutes
- Country: United Kingdom
- Language: English
- Budget: $500,000
- Box office: $2.3 million (rentals)

If.... (stylized as if....) is a 1968 British satirical film produced and directed by Lindsay Anderson, and starring Malcolm McDowell in his film debut as the character Mick Travis, who appeared in two further Anderson films. Other actors include Richard Warwick, Christine Noonan, David Wood, and Robert Swann. A biting satire of English public school life, the film follows a group of pupils who stage a savage insurrection at a boys' boarding school. The film is notable for jumpstarting McDowell's and Anderson's careers as well as using black-and-white and colour switches throughout the film along with blending surrealist dreamlike sequences and realistic elements. Director Stephen Frears worked as an assistant director to Anderson on this film.

Upon release, If.... received critical acclaim, with praise for its powerful and accurate depiction of the British public school system. It continues to be considered one of the greatest British films of the 20th century for its portrayal of youthful rebellion.

== Plot ==
The pupils return after the summer for a new Michaelmas term at a traditional British public school for boys in the late 1960s. Mick Travis arrives hiding his moustache, which he quickly shaves off. He, Wallace, and Knightly are three non-conformist boys in the lower sixth form, their penultimate year. They are watched and persecuted by the "Whips", upper sixth-formers given authority as prefects over the other boys. The junior boys are made to act as personal servants for the Whips, who discuss them as sex objects.

The headmaster is remote from the boys and the housemasters. The protagonists' housemaster, Mr. Kemp, is easily manipulated by the Whips into giving them free rein in enforcing discipline. Some schoolmasters are shown behaving bizarrely.

Mick and Johnny sneak off the school grounds and steal a motorbike from a showroom. They ride to a café staffed by an unnamed girl, about whom Mick fantasizes wrestling naked. Meanwhile, Wallace spends time with a younger boy, Bobby Philips, and later shares his bed.

The three boys drink vodka in their study and consider how one man holds the potential to "change the world with a bullet in the right place." Their clashes with school authorities become increasingly contentious. Eventually, a brutal caning by the Whips spurs them to action.

During a school Combined Cadet Force military drill, Mick acquires live ammunition, which he, Wallace, and Knightly use to open fire on a group of boys and masters, including Kemp and the school chaplain. When the latter orders the boys to drop their weapons, Mick assaults him and cows him into submission.

As punishment for their actions, the trio are ordered by the headmaster to clean out a large storeroom beneath the main school hall. They discover a cache of firearms, including automatic weapons and mortars. Joined by Philips and the girl from the café, they commit to revolt against the establishment.

On Founders' Day, when parents are visiting the school, the group starts a fire under the hall, smoking everyone out of the building. They then open fire on them from the rooftop. Led by a visiting general who had been giving a speech, the staff, students, and parents break open the Combined Cadet Force armoury and begin firing back. The headmaster tries to stop the fight, imploring the group to listen to reason. The girl shoots him between the eyes. The battle continues, and the camera closes in on Mick's face as he keeps firing.

== Cast ==
- Crusaders
  - Malcolm McDowell as Michael Arnold "Mick" Travis
  - David Wood as Johnny Knightly
  - Richard Warwick as “Wally” Wallace
  - Christine Noonan as The Girl
  - Rupert Webster as Bobby Philips
- Whips
  - Robert Swann as Rowntree
  - Hugh Thomas as Denson
  - Michael Cadman as Fortinbras
  - Peter Sproule as Barnes
- Staff
  - Peter Jeffrey as Headmaster
  - Anthony Nicholls as General Denson
  - Arthur Lowe as Mr. Kemp, Housemaster
  - Mona Washbourne as Matron
  - Mary MacLeod as Mrs. Kemp, housemaster's wife
  - Geoffrey Chater as Chaplain
  - Ben Aris as John Thomas, Undermaster
  - Graham Crowden as History master
  - Charles Lloyd-Pack as Classics master
- Seniors
  - Guy Ross as Stephans
  - Robin Askwith as Keating
  - Richard Everett as Pussy Graves
  - Philip Bagenal as Peanuts
  - Nicholas Page as Cox
  - Robert Yetzes as Fisher
  - David Griffin as Willens
  - Graham Sharman as Van Eyssen
  - Richard Tombleson as Baird
- Juniors
  - Robin Davies as Machin (credited as Richard Davis)
  - Brian Pettifer as Biles
  - Michael Newport as Brunning
  - Charles Sturridge as Markland
  - Sean Bury as Jute
  - Martin Beaumont as Hunter
- Additional cast
  - John Garrie as Music master (uncredited)
  - Tommy Godfrey as Finchley the school porter (uncredited)
  - Chris Chittell as Senior schoolboy (uncredited)
  - Simon Ward as Junior schoolboy (uncredited)
  - Ellis Dale as Motorcycle salesman (uncredited)

== Influences ==
The film's surrealist sequences have been compared to Jean Vigo's French classic Zero for Conduct (1933). Anderson acknowledged an influence, and described how he arranged a viewing of that film with his screenwriters, Sherwin and Howlett, at an early stage in production planning, though in his view the Vigo film's influence on If.... was structural rather than merely cosmetic. "Seeing Vigo's film gave us the idea and also the confidence to proceed with the kind of scene-structure that we devised for the first part of the film particularly."

== Production ==
=== Screenplay ===
David Sherwin's original title for the screenplay was Crusaders, during the writing of which he drew heavily from his experiences at Tonbridge School in Kent. In 1960, he and his friend and co-writer John Howlett took it to director Seth Holt. Holt felt unqualified to direct, but offered to produce the film. They also took it to Sherwin's hero, Rebel Without a Cause director Nicholas Ray, who liked it but had a nervous breakdown before anything came of it. Holt introduced Sherwin to Lindsay Anderson in a Soho pub.

=== Filming ===
The school used for the early filming on location was Anderson's alma mater, Cheltenham College, Gloucestershire, but this was not made public at the time under the agreement needed to shoot there. The then headmaster, David Ashcroft, persuaded the school governors to agree that the film could be made. Aldenham School in Elstree, Hertfordshire, was used for later scenes filmed after previous summer commitments prevented further shooting at Cheltenham. The sweat room scenes were filmed in the School Room in School House at Aldenham School (though they were redesigned for the film). The dormitory scenes were also at Aldenham—specifically The Long Room for the junior boys, and the room with the wooden partitions called Lower Cubs (short for cubicles). The shower scene and toilets were in School House changing rooms.

The transport cafe was the (now demolished) Packhorse Cafe on the A5/Watling Street in Kensworth, Dunstable, Bedfordshire, close to the Packhorse Pub. The painting in the dining hall is of Aldenham School's founder, Richard Platt. The Hall scene was an amalgamation of the school halls at Cheltenham and Aldenham. Carew Manor, in Beddington, Surrey, was used for the opening staircase scene and for several other scenes. It was filmed during the summer when the school had closed for holidays. Some scenes were shot at the former Trinity School of John Whitgift in central Croydon, before it was demolished to make way for the Whitgift Centre; pupil extras from the separate Whitgift School were engaged at £5 per day.

Anderson originally approached Charterhouse School and later Cranleigh School for permission to shoot the film: negotiations were going well until the schools discovered the content of the film and pulled out. The outside shots of the school including the final showdown on the roof were filmed at Cheltenham College after term ended. The Speech Day interior was filmed inside St John's Church on Albion Street, Cheltenham. The church was later demolished. The motorbike shop was filmed at the Broadway Motor Company on Gladstone Road, Wimbledon.

The film makes use of black-and-white sequences. In the audio commentary to the 2007 DVD release, Malcolm McDowell confirmed that lighting the chapel scenes for colour filming would have taken much longer than for black and white. The time they could use the school chapel was limited, so Anderson opted to not shoot those scenes in colour. Liking the effect this gave, he then decided to shoot other sequences in black and white to improve the 'texture' of the film. As a child, he was impressed watching a gangster film which started in black and white and then turned to colour.

=== Post-production ===
The black-and-white sequence featuring Mrs Kemp (Mary MacLeod) walking naked through the school was allowed by the then Secretary of the Board of the British Board of Film Censors, John Trevelyan, on the condition that shots of male genitalia from the shower scene were removed.

Music featured in the film includes the 'Sanctus', from the Missa Luba, a rendering of the Roman Latin mass sung to an African beat by a Congolese choir.

== Release ==
The film closed the London Film Festival on 5 December 1968 before opening in London later that month.

== Reception ==
=== Critical reception ===
Time Out wrote: "A modern classic in which Anderson minutely captures both the particular ethos of a public school and the general flavour of any structured community, thus achieving a clear allegorical force without sacrificing a whit of his exploration of an essentially British institution. The impeccable logic of the conclusion is in no way diminished by having been lifted from Vigo's Zéro de Conduite [1933], made thirty-five years earlier. If... was also a timely film – shooting began two months before the events of May 1968 in Paris. Along with The White Bus, it put Anderson into a pretty high league."

Variety wrote: "Timely and timeless, this is a punchy, poetic pic that delves into the epic theme of youthful revolt. ...The script has the expert blend of heightened reality and lyricism enforced by the brilliant direction and the playing of a cast of unknowns."

The Radio Times Guide to Films gave the film 4/5 stars, writing: "With its surrealistic elements, it was something of a departure for This Sporting Life [1963] director Lindsay Anderson, but he succeeds in both capturing the atmosphere and absurdities of public school life and investing the satire with plenty of venom. Malcolm McDowell gives a blistering performance in what is a key film in British cinema history."

Leslie Halliwell, dissenting from the general praise for the film, wrote that "Allegorical treatment of school life with much fashionable emphasis on obscure narrative, clever cutting, variety of pace, even an unaccountable changing from colour to monochrome and vice versa. Intelligence is clearly at work, but it seems to have suffered from undigested gobs of Pinter, and the film as a whole makes no discernible point."

On Rotten Tomatoes, the film holds a 90% approval rating based on 49 reviews, with an average score of 7.9/10. According to the site's critical consensus, "Incendiary, subversive, and darkly humorous, If.... is a landmark of British countercultural cinema."

In the season 2, episode 6 of Monty Python: Flying Circus called "It's a Living", there's a sketch that references the movie's finale.

=== Accolades ===
If.... won the Palme d'Or at the 1969 Cannes Film Festival. In 1999, the British Film Institute named it the 12th greatest British film of the 20th century; in 2004, the magazine Total Film named it the 16th greatest British film of all time. In 2017 a poll of 150 actors, directors, writers, producers and critics for Time Out magazine ranked it the 9th best British film ever.

=== McDowell's casting in A Clockwork Orange ===
McDowell's performance in If.... caught the attention of Stanley Kubrick, who subsequently cast him in his 1971 film adaptation of Anthony Burgess's A Clockwork Orange. McDowell used his performance in If.... in his inspiration for the Clockwork Orange protagonist, Alexander DeLarge. Having been given the script by Kubrick, McDowell was unsure how he should play the part of Alex, and so he contacted Lindsay Anderson, asking for advice. McDowell relates the story:

Anyway, he said 'Malcolm, this is how you play the part: there is a scene of you, a close-up in If...., where you open the doors to the gymnasium, to be beaten. You get a close-up.' I said 'that's right.' He said 'do you remember...' I said 'yes. I smiled.' He said 'that's right. You gave them that smile. That sort of ironic smile,' he said 'and that's how you play Alex.' And I went 'my god, that's brilliant. That's brilliant.' That's all I needed and that was enough, and that is a brilliant piece of direction for an actor.

== Sequels ==
If.... is the first film in the Mick Travis Trilogy, all starring Malcolm McDowell as everyman character Mick Travis, followed by O Lucky Man! (1973) and finally Britannia Hospital (1982).

The two sequels do not follow the same continuity of the first film, and have little in common other than the main character of Mick Travis and several identically named characters in similar roles (on the commentary track for O Lucky Man!, Malcolm McDowell refers to it as a "so-called trilogy").

At the time of Anderson's death he had completed a final draft of a proper sequel to If...., but it was never made. The sequel takes place during a Founders' Day celebration at which many of the characters reunite. Mick Travis is now an Oscar-nominated movie star, eschewing England for Hollywood. Wallace is a military major who has lost his arm, Johnny is a clergyman, and Rowntree is the Minister of War. In the script, Rowntree is kidnapped by a group of anti-war students and saved by Mick and his gang, though not before Mick crucifies Rowntree with a large nail through his palm.

== See also ==
- BFI Top 100 British films
- List of cult films
