= Malcolm McDowell =

British actor (born 1943)

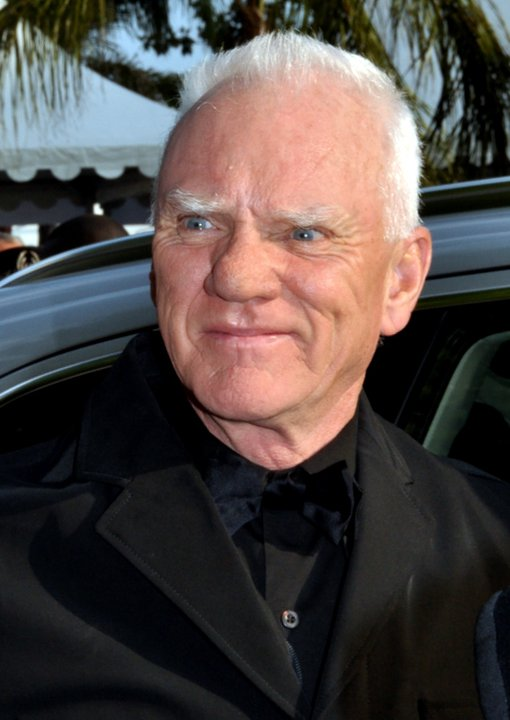
- McDowell in 2011
- Born: Malcolm John Taylor; 13 June 1943 (age 83); Horsforth, West Riding of Yorkshire, England
- Education: London Academy of Music and Dramatic Art
- Occupations: Actor; producer
- Years active: 1964–present
- Works: Full list
- Spouses: Margot Bennett (m. 1975; div. 1980); Mary Steenburgen (m. 1980; div. 1990); Kelley Kuhr (m. 1991)
- Children: 5, including Charlie McDowell
- Relatives: Alexander Siddig (nephew); Lily Collins (daughter-in-law)
- Website: malcolmmcdowellonline.com

Malcolm McDowell (born Malcolm John Taylor, 13 June 1943) is an English actor. He first became known for portraying Mick Travis in Lindsay Anderson's If.... (1968), a role he later reprised in O Lucky Man! (1973) and Britannia Hospital (1982). His performance in If.... prompted Stanley Kubrick to cast him as Alex in A Clockwork Orange (1971), the role for which McDowell became best known.

McDowell's other notable film credits include The Raging Moon (1971), Time After Time (1979), Caligula (1979), Cat People (1982), Blue Thunder (1983), The Caller (1987), Star Trek Generations (1994), Tank Girl (1995), Mr. Magoo (1997), Gangster No. 1 (2000), The Company (2003), Evilenko (2004), Easy A (2010), The Artist (2011), and Bombshell (2019). He also played Dr. Samuel Loomis in the 2007 remake of Halloween and its 2009 sequel.

On television, he had recurring roles on Entourage (2005–2011), The Mentalist (2008–2015), and Heroes (2006–2007), and starring roles in Fantasy Island (1998), Franklin & Bash (2011–2014), Mozart in the Jungle (2014–2018), and Son of a Critch (2022–2026). He has also voiced characters in various animated shows, films and video games, including Metallo in Superman: The Animated Series (1996–1999), Vater Orlaag in Metalocalypse (2007–2013, 2023), Dr. Calico in Bolt (2008), President John Henry Eden in Fallout 3 (2008), Molag Bal in The Elder Scrolls Online (2014), and Dr. Monty in Call of Duty: Black Ops III (2016).

McDowell is the recipient of an Evening Standard British Film Award, alongside nominations for Golden Globe and Screen Actors Guild Awards. He received a star on the Hollywood Walk of Fame in 2012.

== Early life ==
McDowell was born Malcolm John Taylor on 13 June 1943 in Horsforth, West Riding of Yorkshire, the son of hotelier Edna (née McDowell) and RAF officer (and later pub owner) Charles Taylor. He has an older sister named Gloria and a younger sister named Judy. Gloria later had a son, actor Alexander Siddig, alongside whom McDowell would appear in the film Doomsday (2008). The family moved to Bridlington, East Riding of Yorkshire, where McDowell's father was stationed at the nearby RAF Carnaby. They then moved to Liverpool, where McDowell grew up and as a teenager took a job in a Planters nut factory in nearby Aintree, as well as working at his father's pub, The Bull and Dog, in Burscough, Lancashire. He began taking acting classes while in school, later moving to London in order to train as an actor at the London Academy of Music and Dramatic Art (LAMDA).

Because there was already a working actor named Malcolm Taylor and British Actors' Equity Association rules did not allow two different individuals to work under the same name, he adopted Malcolm McDowell as his professional name, using his mother's maiden name as a surname.

== Career ==
=== Acting ===
McDowell in Voyage of the Damned (1976)

McDowell initially secured work as an extra with the Royal Shakespeare Company. He made his film debut as school rebel Mick Travis in if.... (1968) by British director Lindsay Anderson. A landmark of British countercultural cinema, the BFI named if.... the 12th-greatest British film of the 20th century. McDowell's next roles were in Figures in a Landscape (1970) and The Raging Moon (1971). His performance in if.... caught the attention of Stanley Kubrick, who cast McDowell for the lead in A Clockwork Orange (1971), adapted from the novel by Anthony Burgess. He gained massive acclaim for his performance as Alex DeLarge, a young, antisocial hoodlum who undergoes brainwashing by the British government in a near future society. He was nominated for a Golden Globe, a National Society of Film Critics Award, and a New York Film Critics Circle Award as Best Actor. Of the Clockwork Orange performance, film critic Pauline Kael wrote that McDowell played the character "exuberantly, with the power and slyness of a young Cagney."

He worked with Anderson again for O Lucky Man! (1973, also wrote), which was inspired by McDowell's experience working as a coffee salesman, and Britannia Hospital (1982). McDowell regularly appeared on British television productions in the 1970s in adaptations of theatre classics, one example being with Laurence Olivier in The Collection (1976), as part of the series Laurence Olivier Presents. He starred in Aces High (1976) and co-starred in Voyage of the Damned (1976), and as Dornford Yates' gentleman hero Richard Chandos in She Fell Among Thieves (1978) and the title character in Caligula (1979). He made his Hollywood debut as H. G. Wells in Time After Time (1979). He has often portrayed antagonists, later remarking on his career playing film villains: "I suppose I'm primarily known for that but in fact, that would only be half of my career if I was to top it all up". In his biography Anthony Burgess: A Life, author Roger Lewis commented on McDowell's later career: "his pretty-boy looks faded and he was condemned to playing villains in straight-to-video films that turn up on Channel 5".

McDowell appeared in the action film Blue Thunder (1983) as F.E. Cochrane, and the horror remake Cat People (1982). In 1983, he starred in Get Crazy as Reggie Wanker, a parody of Mick Jagger. Also in 1983, McDowell starred as the Wolf (Reginald von Lupen) in Faerie Tale Theatre's rendition of "Little Red Riding Hood" (his wife at that time, Mary Steenburgen, played Little Red Riding Hood). In 1984, he narrated the documentary The Compleat Beatles. He is known in Star Trek circles as "the man who killed Captain Kirk", appearing in the film Star Trek Generations (1994) in which he played the mad scientist Dr. Tolian Soran, and several overzealous Star Trek fans even issued death threats for this. McDowell appeared in several computer games, most notably as Admiral Geoffrey Tolwyn in the Wing Commander series of computer games. His appearance in Wing Commander III marked the series transition from 2D pre-rendered cutscenes to live-action cutscenes.

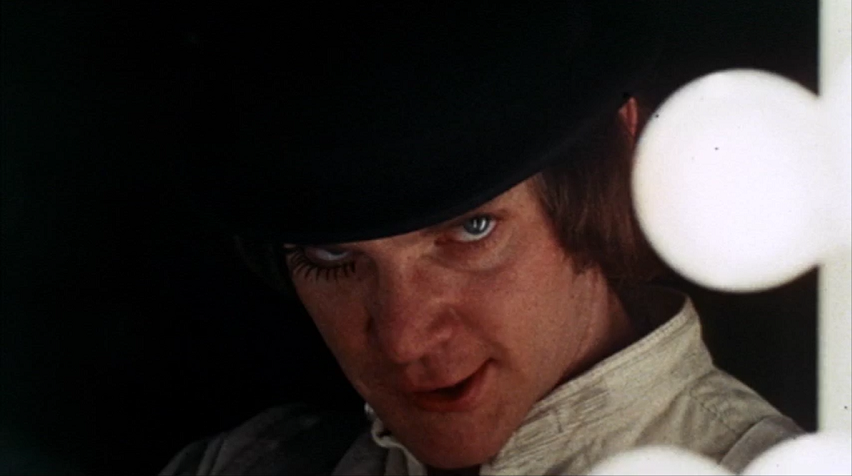
McDowell in A Clockwork Orange (1971)

In 1995, he co-starred with actress and artist Lori Petty in the science fiction/action comedy film Tank Girl. Here, he played the villain Dr. Kesslee, the evil director of the global Water and Power Company, whose main goal in the story was to control the planet's entire water supply on a future desert-like, post-apocalyptic Earth.

In 1998 he starred as Mr. Rourke in the first revival of Fantasy Island.

McDowell appeared in a 2000 episode of the animated series South Park, which was a comedic retelling of the Charles Dickens novel Great Expectations. In the episode, McDowell played the real-life narrator of the story in live action, introducing himself simply as "a British person", in a parody of Masterpiece Theatre, and its ex-host, Alistair Cooke.

McDowell played himself in Robert Altman's The Player, in which he chastises protagonist Griffin Mill (Tim Robbins) for badmouthing him behind his back. He worked with Altman once again for The Company (2003) as "Mr. A.", the fictional director of the Joffrey Ballet of Chicago. His character was based on real-life director Gerald Arpino. McDowell had a brief but memorable role as the psychopathic Gangster in the British crime film Gangster No. 1 (2000). In the film I'll Sleep When I'm Dead (2003), he played a straight married man who rapes a young drug dealer to "teach him a lesson". The film also starred Clive Owen as the victim's elder brother.

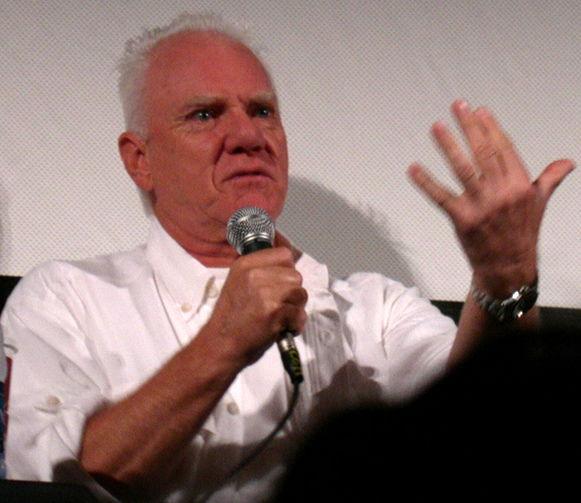
McDowell at the 2006 Traverse City Film Festival

In 2006, McDowell portrayed radio mogul Jonas Slaughter on Law & Order: Criminal Intent. The following year, he portrayed the villainous Mr. Linderman on the first season of the NBC series Heroes, a role he reprised in the third-season premiere. He starred in Jerry Was a Man, which appeared as an episode of Masters of Science Fiction on Sky. He portrayed Terrence McQuewick on Entourage, and he made a special guest appearance as the icy fashion designer Julian Hodge in the Monk season 4 episode, "Mr. Monk Goes to a Fashion Show". Never Apologize is a 2007 documentary film of Malcolm McDowell's one-man show about his experiences working with film director Lindsay Anderson.

McDowell appeared as Dr. Samuel Loomis in Rob Zombie's remakes of Halloween and Halloween II (in 2007 and 2009, respectively). Although the films were not well received critically, they performed better at the box office and McDowell was widely praised. He also played Desmond LaRochette in Robert Whitlow's The List (2007), and Irish patriarch Enda Doyle in Red Roses and Petrol (2003). His next film was the Canadian vampire comedy rock and roll film Suck (2009) with actor/director Rob Stefaniuk and the Alex Wright film Two Wolves. In December 2009, he made an appearance in the music video "Snuff" by the heavy metal band Slipknot. He appears, uncredited, as the curator Lombardi, in the film The Book of Eli (2010). McDowell portrayed Satan in the Christian comedy thriller film Suing the Devil (2011).

In 2011, McDowell was cast in the role of Stanton Infeld on the TNT original series Franklin & Bash and appeared in the Academy Award-winning film The Artist. In 2012, McDowell appeared in the horror films Vamps and Silent Hill: Revelation. Also that year, he received a star on the Hollywood Walk of Fame, aptly outside the Pig n' Whistle British pub on Hollywood Boulevard. His fellow British actor Gary Oldman was in attendance and paid tribute to McDowell for inspiring him to become an actor.

In 2013, he appeared as the title character in the psychological thriller The Employer, for which he won Best Actor at the Los Angeles Movie Awards. In 2013, McDowell also ventured into the Steampunk genre, starring in the short film Cowboys & Engines alongside Richard Hatch and Walter Koenig. In 2013, he starred as King Henry II of England in the film Richard the Lionheart, with Gregory Chandler as the title character. He portrayed Father Murder in the 2016 Rob Zombie film 31. McDowell also played Boogeyman in Abnormal Attraction (2018) co-starring Gilbert Gottfried, Bruce Davison, Tyler Mane and Leslie Easterbrook.

Since 2022, McDowell has played the grandfather of the protagonist in the Canadian TV series Son of a Critch.

In 2023, he starred opposite Lou Diamond Phillips in the independently-produced comedy thriller film Et Tu.

=== Voice acting ===
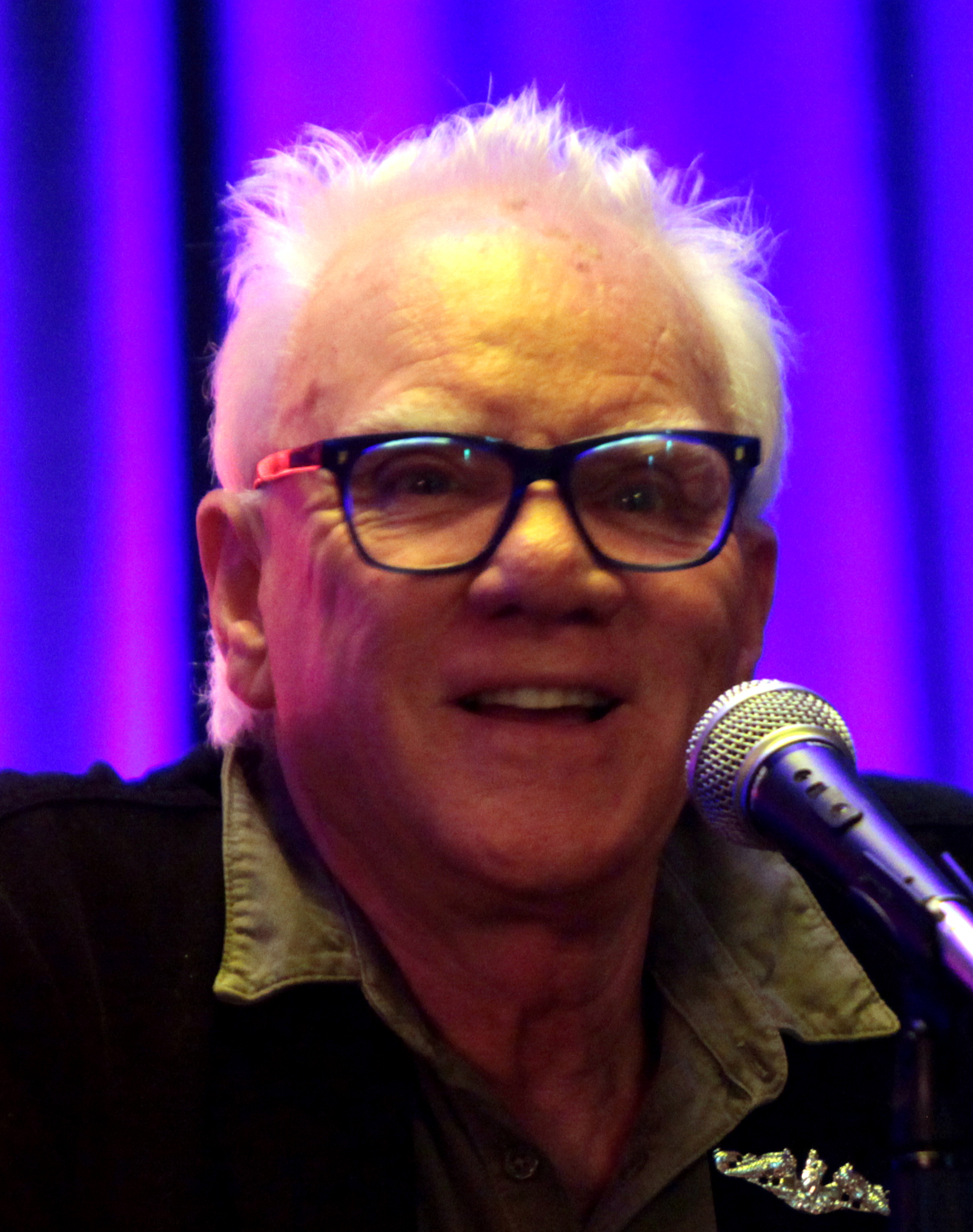
McDowell in 2016

McDowell was the featured narrator in the documentary The Compleat Beatles, released in 1982. He voiced Lord Maliss in Happily Ever After (1989), Zarm in the cartoon Captain Planet and the Planeteers, the Superman villain Metallo in Superman: The Animated Series, Mad Mod in Teen Titans, Merlyn in DC Showcase: Green Arrow (2010), Arkady Duvall in Batman: The Animated Series, and a Death Star commander in a Robot Chicken episode parodying Star Wars. He was also a regular on the second season of the Adult Swim cartoon Metalocalypse as Vater Orlaag and other characters. McDowell also voiced Dr. Calico in Disney's Bolt (2008) and the henchman Reeses II in the animated series Captain Simian & the Space Monkeys, a show laced with references to many films, including his own role in A Clockwork Orange. Once again McDowell starred alongside Warner in the episode "Rhesus Pieces".

In 2006–07, he contributed spoken word to two Pink Floyd tribute albums produced by Billy Sherwood: Back Against the Wall and Return to the Dark Side of the Moon. He has also provided voice-over work for Borgore on his album #NEWGOREORDER (2014). In 2008, McDowell began a recurring role as Reginald Fletcher in Phineas and Ferb. He also narrated the award-winning documentary Blue Gold: World Water Wars.

McDowell reprised his role of Metallo in the video game Superman: Shadow of Apokolips and an episode of Justice League Unlimited. He also provided his voice for the character President John Henry Eden in the video game Fallout 3, Rupert Pelham in the game WET, Solomon in the Word of Promise Audio Bible, and the CEO of Stahl Arms in Killzone 3, Jorhan Stahl. He also voiced Daedalus in God of War III. He is the voice for the primary antagonist Molag Bal in the MMO The Elder Scrolls Online. He is also the voice of Dr. Monty in Call of Duty: Black Ops III.

McDowell portrayed Caiaphas in The Truth & Life Dramatised audio New Testament Bible, a 22-hour, celebrity-voiced, fully dramatised audio New Testament which uses the RSV-CE translation.

McDowell is the host of Fangoria's Dreadtime Stories, a monthly series of radio dramas with a mystery, horror, science fiction and dark humour theme. Each month, a new episode is available for download, and scripts, as used by McDowell and the supporting actors, are also available at the Fangoria website.

He provided the voice for Triton (Ship's Computer) in the 2015 science-fiction short film, Oceanus: Act One.

In 2020, he interpreted Gabriele Tinti's poetry inspired by epigraphs collected in the National Roman Museum.

He guest-starred in the SpongeBob SquarePants episode "Pet the Rock" as Pervical.

=== Honours ===
McDowell refused the degree of Commander of the Order of the British Empire in 1984 and to be a Knight Bachelor in 1995.

== Personal life ==
McDowell met actress and publicist Margot Bennett in March 1969, and they married in April 1975. The couple divorced in September 1980. He met actress Mary Steenburgen in 1978 while filming Time After Time, and they married in September 1980. They had two children together, including Charlie McDowell. The couple divorced in 1990. He and his third wife, Kelley Kuhr, had three sons in the 2000s, with the youngest born in 2009.

McDowell became a fan of Liverpool F.C. after moving to the city as a child; he spent much of his childhood at Anfield. McDowell continues to support the team.

== Awards and nominations ==
Institution	Year	Category	Work	Result
Bare Bones International Film Festival	2015	Best Actor	Bereave	Nominated
Canadian Screen Awards	2023	Best Supporting Performance in a Comedy Series	Son of a Critch	Nominated
Evening Standard British Film Awards	1972	Best Actor	A Clockwork Orange	Won
Golden Globe Awards	1972	Best Actor in a Motion Picture – Drama	A Clockwork Orange	Nominated
Hoboken International Film Festival	2015	Best Actor	Bereave	Nominated
Sitges Film Festival	2009	Honorary Grand Prize for Lifetime Achievement	—N/a	Won
Nastro d'Argento	2005	European Silver Ribbon	Evilenko	Won
National Society of Film Critics	1972	Best Actor	A Clockwork Orange, The Raging Moon	Nominated
New York Film Critics Circle	1971	Best Actor	A Clockwork Orange	Nominated
Northeast Film Festival	2017	Best Supporting Actor in a Feature Film	American Satan	Won
Northeast Film Festival	2017	Best Ensemble Cast	American Satan	Won
Philadelphia Film Festival	2005	Artistic Achievement Award	—N/a	Won
San Luis Obispo International Film Festival	2009	King Vidor Memorial Award	—N/a	Won
Screen Actors Guild Awards	2020	Outstanding Performance by a Cast in a Motion Picture	Bombshell	Nominated
Taormina Film Fest	2005	Taormina Arte Award	—N/a	Won

== Interviews ==
- N.P. Thompson's interview with Malcolm McDowell for Slant/The House Next Door
- "Malcolm McDowell on Free Cinema". BFI Screenonline. Archived from the original on 6 August 2008.
- "What if..." – The Guardian, 24 April 2004. In-depth profile and interview.
- "O Lucky Man! Malcolm McDowell's journey from coffee salesman to movie star" – The Times, 17 May 2008
- "Audiobook read by Malcolm McDowell" – The Bobbything, 2010
- "COWBOYS & ENGINES" – by Bryn Pryor
