= April Flowers =

April Flowers may refer to:

- April Flowers (film), 2017 US film
- April Flowers, a stripper involved in a 1961 attempt to blackmail George Ratterman
