= Arrow season 2 =

Arrow
- Season 2
- Region 2 DVD cover
- Showrunners: Greg Berlanti; Marc Guggenheim; Andrew Kreisberg
- Starring: Stephen Amell; Katie Cassidy; David Ramsey; Willa Holland; Emily Bett Rickards; Colton Haynes; Manu Bennett; Susanna Thompson; Paul Blackthorne
- No. of episodes: 23

Release
- Original network: The CW
- Original release: October 9, 2013 – May 14, 2014

Season chronology
- ← Previous; Season 1 Next → Season 3

The second season of the American television series Arrow premiered on The CW on October 9, 2013, and concluded on May 14, 2014, with a total of 23 episodes. The series is based on the DC Comics character Green Arrow, a costumed crime-fighter created by Mort Weisinger and George Papp, and is set in the Arrowverse, sharing continuity with other Arrowverse television series. The showrunners for this season were Greg Berlanti, Marc Guggenheim and Andrew Kreisberg. Stephen Amell stars as Oliver Queen, with principal cast members Katie Cassidy as Laurel Lance, David Ramsey as John Diggle, Willa Holland as Thea Queen, Susanna Thompson as Moira Queen, and Paul Blackthorne as Quentin Lance returning from the previous season. They are joined by Emily Bett Rickards as Felicity Smoak, Colton Haynes as Roy Harper and Manu Bennett as Slade Wilson, who were promoted to series regulars from their recurring status in the previous season.

The series follows billionaire playboy Oliver Queen (Stephen Amell), who claimed to have spent five years shipwrecked on Lian Yu, a mysterious island in the North China Sea, before returning home to Starling City (later renamed "Star City") to fight crime and corruption as a secret vigilante whose weapon of choice is a bow and arrow. In the second season, Oliver has vowed to stop crime without killing criminals, using "The Arrow" as his new name to represent that, and is aided with by allies, John and Felicity. Oliver's vow is tested when he comes under attack from Slade Wilson (Manu Bennett), a man from Oliver's time on Lian Yu who resurfaces with a vendetta against him. Oliver grows to accept aspiring vigilante Roy Harper as his protégé, and begins to receive assistance from Quentin. Oliver also gains another ally in Sara Lance (Caity Lotz) who survived her ordeal at sea six years prior. The season features flashbacks to Oliver's second year on Lian Yu where he faces a new threat from Dr. Anthony Ivo (Dylan Neal), whilst continuing to struggle to survive alongside allies Slade and Sara, and the archer Shado (Celina Jade). The origins of his feud with Slade is revealed.

The series was renewed for its second season on February 11, 2013. The second season received critical acclaim, and averaged 3.28 million viewers each week. The season would go on to be nominated for fifteen nominations in various categories. This season introduces characters from The Flash, which was being developed as a potential spin-off at the time. The season was released on DVD and Blu-ray on September 16, 2014. The series was renewed for a third season on February 12, 2014.

== Episodes ==
This season was prefaced with a recap special on October 2, 2013, titled "Year One". It featured highlights of the first season and a preview of the second.

Arrow, season 2 episodes
No. overall	No. in season	Title	Directed by	Written by	Original release date	Prod. code	U.S. viewers (millions)
24	1	"City of Heroes"	John Behring	Story by : Greg Berlanti; Teleplay by : Andrew Kreisberg & Marc Guggenheim	October 9, 2013	2J7451	2.74
Following the Glades' destruction and Tommy Merlyn's death, Oliver Queen returns to Lian Yu alone as penance for failing his city and Tommy. Felicity Smoak and John Diggle arrive and convince Oliver to return, informing him that his mother, Moira, is awaiting trial and that Queen Consolidated is under threat of takeover and dissolution by Isabel Rochev. Laurel Lance is now working for the District Attorney. Oliver learns a group of vigilantes dressed like "The Hood" are murdering others as earthquake retribution. They target Oliver twice before kidnapping his sister, Thea. Oliver saves her without killing anyone, leaving the vigilantes for Quentin Lance, who has been demoted to patrol officer. Roy Harper, also trying to protect the Glades, is rescued by an unknown female vigilante. Using Walter Steele's help, Oliver saves his company and forces Rochev to accept a partnership. Thea reconciles with Moira. Oliver decides to honor Tommy's memory both by becoming a hero in Starling City and finding a new name for his alter ego. In a flashback, Oliver, Shado, and Slade Wilson encounter new armed men after months of believing they are alone. The newcomers are revealed to be searching specific graves.
25	2	"Identity"	Nick Copus	Ben Sokolowski & Beth Schwartz	October 16, 2013	2J7452	3.06
Roy fails to stop a truck robbery committed by Chien Na Wei. When Oliver attempts to convince Roy to stop being a vigilante, Oliver learns that the hospital in the Glades is having its medicine stolen. Oliver sets a trap for Chien, who escapes after having Ben Turner, a henchman with claws, fight him; the police arrive and the two escape. Diggle is revealed to have ended his relationship with Carly. Oliver decides to work with Sebastian Blood, an alderman for the Glades, to bring awareness and help for the people in need, but is forced to abandon his appearance at a charity event to instead stop Chien, who then gets arrested. Blood lambastes him in the press for flaking. The vigilante asks Roy to stop fighting in his name, but instead provide him intel on the Glades. Afterwards, Laurel, blaming the vigilante for Tommy's death, sets a trap for him, seemingly surrounding him with police. In a flashback, Slade advises Oliver not to let his relationship with Shado get too serious. The trio discovers a cave containing the remains of several cranially disfigured World War II Japanese soldiers.
26	3	"Broken Dolls"	Glen Winter	Marc Guggenheim & Keto Shimizu	October 23, 2013	2J7453	2.89
Oliver assigns Roy to track a woman who inadvertently tries to be a vigilante; she helps him escape the police through her connection to a woman named Cindy. Quentin learns that the serial killer Barton Mathis, whom he arrested years earlier, escaped from prison during the earthquake and is on a killing spree again. Believing the vigilante's claims that he's changed, Quentin enlists his help. The team discovers the link between all of the victims. Oliver learns that Mathis has abducted Quentin and Laurel, planning to kill the latter. Oliver saves them right before the female vigilante shows up and murders Mathis. Oliver believes that she has a personal connection with him. Laurel decides that she must blame herself instead of the vigilante for Tommy's death. The District Attorney announces his intention to seek the death penalty for Moira. She tells her lawyer not to fight it, since she had connections with Malcolm Merlyn that she does not want revealed to her children. The female vigilante murders an operative of Ra's al Ghul, her former master. In flashbacks to the island, a ship starts bombarding Oliver and Slade. Oliver finds himself imprisoned with other inmates on a ship called the Amazo.
27	4	"Crucible"	Eagle Egilsson	Andrew Kreisberg & Wendy Mericle	October 30, 2013	2J7454	2.37
Felicity realizes that the female vigilante has been following Laurel, not Oliver. Oliver manages to ambush her and discovers that she is Sara, Laurel's sister who was believed to have drowned. Weapons shipments keep being intercepted by a gang leader calling himself "The Mayor", who assaults a gun rally hosted by Oliver and Blood. Cindy is shot in the process, but Roy saves her. Felicity manages to identify the Mayor as Xavier Reed and tracks him down. Oliver recruits Sara to assist him in capturing Reed. Afterwards, a corrupt police officer brings Reed to an unknown location, where Blood, called Brother Blood by his associates, injects him with a green substance that kills him. He orders another person be brought for the substance. Meanwhile, Laurel develops a drinking problem and refuses help from Quentin and Oliver. In response, Oliver asks Sara to reveal herself to her family, even though he knows they will stop talking to him for lying. In flashbacks, Oliver is questioned about the Japanese bodies but, when he refuses to answer, he is taken to an interrogation room where he first learns that Sara is alive.
28	5	"League of Assassins"	Wendey Stanzler	Jake Coburn & Drew Z. Greenberg	November 6, 2013	2J7455	2.80
Sara and Oliver are attacked by a man dressed like Malcolm Merlyn. Sara states that the man, Al-Owal, is a member of the League of Assassins, of which Malcolm was also a member, and is targeting her for leaving. Al-Owal threatens to murder her family. Oliver manages to protect Laurel, but Quentin refuses to heed Felicity's warning. Sara reveals her identity to him and seeks refuge in a clock tower. They ask for Oliver's help in stopping another attack, with Sara killing Al-Owal and sending a warning to Ra's. Afterwards, Sara decides to leave Starling City to keep her family safe, entrusting her secret with Quentin. Thea and Oliver tell Moira that her secrets will not make them leave her. She agrees to fight the death penalty. In flashbacks, after being left adrift from the Queen's Gambit wreckage, Sara is rescued and brought aboard the Amazo, where she meets Dr. Anthony Ivo, who asks her to help him with his experiments in order to save humanity. Later, she injures Oliver whilst on the Amazo.
29	6	"Keep Your Enemies Closer"	Guy Bee	Ben Sokolowski & Beth Schwartz	November 13, 2013	2J7456	3.09
After A.R.G.U.S. agent Lyla Michaels, Diggle's former wife, goes missing, Oliver charters a trip to Russia to help Diggle find her when they learn that she was following a lead on Floyd Lawton's whereabouts. Isabel Rochev joins the flight, believing that Oliver is trying to meet with a subdivision of Queen Consolidated behind her back. Once there, Oliver and Diggle learn that Lyla is being held in a gulag. They enlist the help of a Russian contact Oliver first met aboard the Amazo. Following their plan, Diggle is arrested and sent to the gulag to rescue Lyla. Oliver has a one-night stand with Isabel. Diggle finds Lawton among the inmates. The pair is forced to team up to save Lyla and escape. Afterwards, Diggle lets Lawton go for helping him save Lyla; in return, Lawton states that he was contracted to kill Diggle's brother by an organization called H.I.V.E. Diggle and Lyla start up again. In flashbacks, Ivo tells Oliver that the Japanese soldiers were transporting "Mirakuru", a secret serum for human enhancement. Later, Sara plays Oliver into revealing that Shado and Slade are still alive. Oliver realizes Sara has betrayed him by revealing his identity to Ivo.
30	7	"State v. Queen"	Bethany Rooney	Marc Guggenheim & Drew Z. Greenberg	November 20, 2013	2J7457	2.66
During the earthquake, The Count escaped from the prison to which he was transferred after recovering from his psychosis. Afterwards, The Count began poisoning civilians, including Diggle and the Assistant District Attorney. The Count reveals in a broadcast that the cure to the sickness is to take Vertigo. In court, Laurel uses an affair between Moira and Malcolm to cast doubts on Moira's defense. Felicity is captured by The Count. In order to protect Felicity from being injected with Vertigo, Oliver is forced to kill The Count. Meanwhile, Blood, hired by The Count to murder the vigilante now known as "the Arrow", is informed that one of his test subjects named Cyrus has survived his injection, feeling "stronger". Ultimately, Moira is exonerated by the jury; she later learns that Malcolm, alive and well, rigged the trial. He also reveals that he now knows Thea is his biological daughter. In a flashback to the island, Shado and Slade rescue Oliver and Sara after Dr. Ivo and his men travel to the island to locate the Hosen, a stone arrowhead which contains coordinates to the wreckage of the Japanese submarine.
31	8	"The Scientist"	Michael Schultz	Story by : Greg Berlanti & Andrew Kreisberg; Teleplay by : Andrew Kreisberg & Geoff Johns	December 4, 2013	2J7458	3.24
When a masked thief with superhuman strength steals a centrifuge from Queen Consolidated, Central City CSI Barry Allen arrives to help with the investigation. Later, he states that he is searching for super-powered beings in the hope that he will find his mother's murderer, thereby exonerating his accused father. Oliver realizes that the thief was enhanced using the same serum for which Ivo was searching. Roy starts to help Cindy find her missing friend, a failed subject of Blood's experiments. Oliver shoots Roy in the leg to prevent him from getting further involved. Oliver tracks the thief, but is injected with an unknown toxin. In order to save Oliver's life, Felicity reveals his identity to Barry so he can help find an antidote. Meanwhile, Merlyn puts pressure on Moira to tell the truth to Thea. Moira instead contacts Ra's, who wants to kill Merlyn for breaking the League's code by destroying the Glades. As a result, Merlyn leaves. In a flashback to the island, Oliver and Shado find the Mirakuru but, when they inject it into Slade without the required sedative, his heart stops just as Ivo arrives with his men. This episode, along with "Three Ghosts", serves as a backdoor pilot to The Flash.
32	9	"Three Ghosts"	John Behring	Story by : Greg Berlanti & Andrew Kreisberg; Teleplay by : Geoff Johns & Ben Sokolowski	December 11, 2013	2J7459	3.02
Barry manages to save Oliver's life. Barry and Felicity are able to identify the thief as Cyrus Gold and locate him. While continuing to investigate the death of Cindy's friend Max, Roy is captured by Cyrus and brought before Blood, who injects him with the Mirakuru, killing Roy. Oliver arrives and murders Cyrus, simultaneously destroying the centrifuge and the remaining serum. Oliver revives Roy, but worries that the serum may affect him negatively. Slade is revealed to be alive in the present and the one orchestrating Blood's dealings; he orders Blood to leave the Arrow alone so that he can deal with him personally. While Roy recovers at the Queen mansion, the serum injection heals the arrow wound in his leg. Barry leaves a domino mask so Oliver can better hide his identity and returns to Central City. While in his lab, Barry is hit by strange lightning caused by an accident at the particle accelerator. In flashbacks, Ivo tells Oliver to choose between Sara and Shado. When Oliver steps in front of Sara, Ivo murders Shado, but flees when Slade turns up with super-human strength and kills his men, leaving the Mirakuru behind. This episode, along with "The Scientist", serves as a backdoor pilot to The Flash.
33	10	"Blast Radius"	Rob Hardy	Jake Coburn & Keto Shimizu	January 15, 2014	2J7460	2.52
Oliver continues his search for the man in the skull mask while Felicity travels to Central City to visit Barry, who is in a coma after being hit by lightning. Serial bomber Mark Scheffer, who goes by the name "Shrapnel", sets off bombs across Starling City as an anti-government movement. Blood begins his campaign for mayor and decides to organize a Unity Rally for the city. Scheffer targets the rally, but Oliver is able to stop him and get him arrested; the bombs are disarmed. During the commotion, Thea witnesses Roy using his new strength and confronts him. As the Arrow, Oliver makes an alliance with Blood. Meanwhile, Quentin starts looking for Cyrus' mole in the police department. Investigating Blood, Laurel visits a mental institution where she finds Blood's mother, who reveals that he killed his father and put her in the asylum to cover it up. In a flashback, Slade experiences adverse effects on his mind and personality from the Mirakuru, which leads to him secretly separating from Oliver and Sara.
34	11	"Blind Spot"	Glen Winter	Wendy Mericle & Beth Schwartz	January 22, 2014	2J7461	2.49
Blood visits his mother and murders her after learning that she told Laurel the truth. Oliver continues his search for the man in the skull mask and receives help from Laurel, who suspects that it is Blood. Fearing that he will be discovered, Blood has Laurel arrested for drug possession by his disciple, Officer Daily. Afterwards, he arranges her kidnap to lure out the Arrow. The latter comes to rescue her but, during the fight, Laurel kills the masked man, revealed to be Daily and unknowingly throwing suspicion off Blood. Laurel is cleared of all charges, but fired because of her addiction. Slade, now wearing a specific suit and mask, is shown to have planned for Blood to get intimate with Laurel in order to hurt Oliver. Meanwhile, Roy and Cindy attempt to use his new powers to stop a murderer, but Roy goes overboard and puts the man in the hospital. The Arrow convinces Roy to train under him in order to control his new powers and altered mental state. In flashbacks, Sara initially considers an offer from Ivo to return the Mirakuru in exchange for safe passage off the island, but changes her mind.
35	12	"Tremors"	Guy Bee	Marc Guggenheim & Drew Z. Greenberg	January 29, 2014	2J7462	2.95
Ben Turner escapes from prison with assistance from H.I.V.E. associate Milo Armitage, who pays him to steal a prototype of Malcolm's earthquake machine. Oliver tells his teammates that Slade got angry when he found out how Shado died, as Slade was in love with her, and attacked him, which ended with Oliver putting an arrow in his eye. The Arrow tracks down the device and is forced to reveal his identity to Roy in order to get his help in destroying it. Meanwhile, Laurel learns that she may be disbarred because of her addiction and spirals further out of control. Oliver convinces Sara to reveal her identity to Laurel. Walter gets Moira to run for mayor against Blood; she states that it is necessary for the campaign that it not come out that Thea is not Robert's biological daughter. Moira's obstetrician knows the truth, so she asks that he be handled. A.R.G.U.S. agent Amanda Waller propositions Turner with commuting his sentence in exchange for him joining a squad she is forming. In flashbacks, Oliver stops Slade from destroying Ivo's freighter with Fyers' missile launcher so they can instead capture the freighter.
36	13	"Heir to the Demon"	Wendey Stanzler	Jake Coburn	February 5, 2014	2J7463	2.86
Nyssa al Ghul, the daughter of Ra's and a member of the League, arrives in Starling City to convince Sara to return to Nanda Parbat with her. It is revealed that the two have a romantic history. Sara refuses, so Nyssa kidnaps her mother and threatens to kill her if Sara does not agree to return. Instead, Sara drinks snake venom. The Arrow arrives with an antidote and Nyssa releases Sara from her obligation to the League. Meanwhile, as Moira begins her political campaign, Felicity discovers that Thea's true father is Malcolm and tells Oliver, who chooses to support Moira's campaign publicly while privately renouncing their familial relationship. Although Sara is welcomed back by her parents, Laurel angrily yells at her. Sara later joins Oliver and they have sex. Slade decides to deal with Moira's campaign against Blood. In flashbacks, Sara and Laurel get into an argument after Laurel tells her that she and Oliver plan on moving in together; Sara agrees to meet Oliver at the docks. Afterwards, Laurel and Quentin watch a news report about the Queen's Gambit going missing. Moira informs them about Sara.
37	14	"Time of Death"	Nick Copus	Wendy Mericle & Beth Schwartz	February 26, 2014	2J7464	2.45
William Tockman orchestrates the heist of an electronic device that will allow him to access any bank vault. Oliver and Sara start working together to stop him, foiling one of his robberies. In response, Tockman uses the machine to hack into the computer servers at Oliver's hideout and overload them so they explode. Felicity, feeling left out with Sara now part of the team, attempts to bait Tockman into coming after one last score. Oliver, Sara, and Diggle arrive in time to protect Felicity, but she takes a bullet to save Sara before knocking Tockman unconscious, feeling part of the team again. Meanwhile, the Lances attempt to have dinner together and it is revealed that Sara and Oliver are in a relationship, much to Laurel's anger. Later, after a vicious argument with Oliver, Laurel reconciles with Sara and attends an A.A. meeting with Quentin. Slade makes his presence known to Oliver by coming to his home and meeting with Moira. In flashbacks, Sara befriends Cindy after promising her dying father, a pilot shot down while flying over the island, to look after her. From the plane, they recover a parachute, which they plan to use to take the freighter.
38	15	"The Promise"	Glen Winter	Jake Coburn & Ben Sokolowski	March 5, 2014	2J7465	2.21
Oliver, Moira, and Thea give Slade, who has funded Moira's campaign, a tour of the house. Sara and the rest of the team are notified and arrive to assist Oliver, forcing Slade to leave without engaging. Oliver deduces that Slade is the one controlling the man in the skull mask, all in an attempt to create more Mirakuru. Slade informs Oliver that he is there to follow through with a promise he made to Oliver on the island. Later, it is revealed that Slade used the tour to plant cameras throughout the house. In flashbacks, Oliver, Slade, and Sara are able to board the ship. Sara frees the prisoners while Oliver and Slade go after Ivo, who tells Slade the truth about Shado's death. Slade turns on Oliver and imprisons him on the ship as Sara and the other prisoners escape to the island. Slade takes control of the ship, amputates Ivo's right hand, and tells Oliver that he kept the Mirakuru, having had Sara and Oliver previously destroy an empty box. He promises Oliver that he will not kill him until he has first made him suffer the loss of those he loves.
39	16	"Suicide Squad"	Larry Teng	Keto Shimizu & Bryan Q. Miller	March 19, 2014	2J7466	2.42
In a flashback to years prior in Afghanistan, Diggle and Lyla are leading a group of Afghan villagers when a wanted man, Gholem Qadir, is identified among them. During an ambush by the rebels, Diggle saves Qadir's life. In the present, Diggle and Lyla are called upon by Waller to lead her "Task Force X", also known as the "Suicide Squad", which consists of Floyd Lawton, Ben Turner, and Mark Scheffer being used as expendable assets. The Squad is sent after Qadir, who has developed a deadly nerve agent. Scheffer attempts to escape and is killed. After saving Qadir's life again through a faked assassination attempt, Diggle is invited to Qadir's home for a party. Once there, Lawton locates the agent and is used as the target marker for a drone strike on the house. Diggle decides to save Lawton while Turner murders Qadir; as a result, the drone misses the house and a Navy SEAL team is forced to destroy the agent. Oliver goes to Waller for help, revealed to have interacted with her in the past. She tells him that A.R.G.U.S. has been tracking a new mercenary called "Deathstroke", whom the pair realize is actually Slade.
40	17	"Birds of Prey"	John Behring	Mark Bemesderfer & A. C. Bradley	March 26, 2014	2J7467	2.62
Oliver and Sara assist a police raid and, in the process, help capture Frank Bertinelli. Oliver quickly realizes that Helena will return to murder Frank once she hears the news. Laurel is asked to return to the District Attorney's office to try Frank's case. Helena shows up at the courthouse and takes hostages in exchange for Frank. Sara attempts to rescue Laurel, but Helena overpowers her and demands that Oliver deliver Frank in exchange for Laurel. Oliver complies, but Frank is killed in a crossfire with the SWAT team; Quentin ultimately arrests Helena after Sara stops her. Helena tells Oliver that he was right to discourage vengeance. Despite only bringing in Laurel as a ruse for Helena, the District Attorney rehires Laurel to avoid a scandal. Roy breaks up with Thea, taking Oliver's advice. Slade drives by and gives her a ride. In flashbacks, Slade demands Sara return Hendrik, one of the escapees who can fix the engines of the ship, threatening to murder Oliver if she does not comply. Sara and the other escapees prepare to send Hendrik back against his will while Slade has the same tattoo that was on Shado's back drawn on Oliver's as a reminder.
41	18	"Deathstroke"	Guy Bee	Marc Guggenheim & Drew Z. Greenberg	April 2, 2014	2J7468	2.32
Slade kidnaps Thea. Oliver gives temporary CEO status to Isabel in his absence and later reconciles with Moira. Isabel uses her momentary power to convince the board of directors to make her position permanent, thus allowing her company to take full control of Queen Consolidated. When confronted, Isabel reveals that she has been working with Slade the entire time and tells Oliver where Thea is being held. Oliver arrives, but Thea has already been released—her kidnapping was a diversion from Slade's real plan to free a group of convicts to use as Mirakuru test subjects. Thea confronts Oliver and Moira, saying that Slade told her that her biological father is Malcolm. Quentin is arrested for aiding the Arrow. Roy leaves Starling City. Polls show Moira's chance of winning the election has increased. Isabel tasks the company's scientific division with working on Mirakuru. Slade, now an announced fugitive, visits Laurel and reveals that Oliver is the Arrow. In flashbacks, Sara attempts to use the trade for Oliver as a moment to kill Slade, but fails. A hallucination of Shado convinces Slade to spare Oliver and Sara, leaving Ivo with them on the island.
42	19	"The Man Under the Hood"	Jesse Warn	Story by : Greg Berlanti & Geoff Johns; Teleplay by : Andrew Kreisberg & Keto Shimizu	April 16, 2014	2J7469	2.26
Oliver's team destroys Isabel's lab so that Slade cannot use it to mass produce Mirakuru. In response, Slade steals an electronic Skeleton Key from Oliver's hideout. He uses it to get a bio-transfuser from the S.T.A.R. Labs facility where Caitlin Snow and Cisco Ramon work so he can transfer Mirakuru-infused blood to the freed convicts. Oliver tracks down Slade and discovers that he is using a kidnapped Roy as the blood donor. Oliver rescues Roy; in the process, Isabel, who is revealed to have been involved with Robert previously, is critically shot. Oliver states there is a cure for Mirakuru and Felicity enlists the help of Caitlin and Cisco. Slade's super soldiers gather and he uses his blood to both heal and empower Isabel. Meanwhile, Laurel discovers that Sara is the female vigilante. Laurel tries to tell Quentin about the Arrow's identity, but he dissuades her from telling anyone. Laurel later blackmails her supervisor into releasing and reinstating Quentin. Thea leaves home, even after Oliver tells her that Robert knew about her paternity. In flashbacks, Oliver kills Ivo on his request after Ivo tells him the location of the Mirakuru cure.
43	20	"Seeing Red"	Doug Aarniokoski	Wendy Mericle & Beth Schwartz	April 23, 2014	2J7470	2.19
Roy goes on a rampage, overwhelmed by the Mirakuru and no longer thinking clearly. During a fight, Oliver's leg is significantly injured and Roy escapes. Sara decides that Roy must be killed, but Oliver disagrees. Roy comes to Verdant and Oliver uses the opportunity to inject Roy with pit viper venom, knocking him unconscious and keeping him sedated until the cure can be found. Sara feels that she is not good enough for Oliver and leaves the city to find a friend of hers. Meanwhile, Thea continues to distance herself from her family, so Moira opts to drop out of the mayoral race. When Oliver dissuades her, she reveals that she has known Oliver was the Arrow since last year's earthquake and is proud of the man he has become. Moira, Thea, and Oliver are attacked by Slade, who tells Oliver to choose between his mother and sister like he did with Sara and Shado. When Oliver refuses, Moira sacrifices herself and is murdered by Slade. In a flashback to seven years prior, Oliver has gotten a young woman, Samantha Clayton, pregnant, so Moira pays Samantha to tell Oliver that she had a miscarriage and leave Starling City.
44	21	"City of Blood"	Michael Schultz	Holly Harold	April 30, 2014	2J7471	2.31
When Oliver doesn't show up at Moira's funeral, Diggle and Felicity enlist the help of Amanda to track him down. They find him in a secret hideout, where he tells them he intends to surrender to Slade and face his fate in order to protect everyone else. Meanwhile, Isabel returns and shuts down Verdant, forcing Thea to choose to leave Starling City, and Sebastian is sworn in as Mayor. Diggle and Felicity inform Laurel of Oliver's intention to surrender to Slade. Laurel confronts him, revealing that she knows he is the Arrow. She tells him that Sebastian is working with Slade and that she has documented proof that Sebastian knew Slade was going to murder Moira. After confronting Sebastian, Oliver decides that they have no choice but to kill Slade's army. The group of Mirakuru soldiers wearing Deathstroke masks wreak havoc on the city, cornering Oliver and Laurel. Diggle is confronted by Deathstroke armor-wearing Isabel. In flashbacks, Anatoly repairs the Japanese submarine. As he and Oliver prepare to attack the Amazo, Oliver gets a distress signal from Sara outside the submarine.
45	22	"Streets of Fire"	Nick Copus	Jake Coburn & Ben Sokolowski	May 7, 2014	2J7472	2.33
As Slade's army continues to terrorize the city, Felicity and Diggle outwit Isabel and escape. S.T.A.R. Labs finishes the Mirakuru cure, but Slade sends men to acquire it before Oliver. Finally trusting Quentin, the police force pledges to help the Arrow stop Slade's men and Quentin is reinstated to lead them. Slade reveals to Blood that he plans to destroy the entire city, people and all, in his quest for vengeance against Oliver. As a result, Blood steals the cure and gives it to Oliver in return for help saving the city. For his betrayal, Slade has Isabel kill Blood. Oliver tests the cure on Roy after Amanda states that she intends to bomb the city at dawn to prevent Slade's men from attacking the rest of the country. Meanwhile, Sara returns and saves Laurel, who gives her the alias "Canary". Malcolm saves Thea from an assailant and tries to convince her to leave with him, but she shoots him. In flashbacks, Oliver boards the Amazo to rescue Sara, who was captured by Slade, with specific orders for Anatoly to destroy the ship if they do not return within an hour. However, they are both captured by Slade.
46	23	"Unthinkable"	John Behring	Story by : Greg Berlanti; Teleplay by : Marc Guggenheim & Andrew Kreisberg	May 14, 2014	2J7473	2.37
In flashbacks, the Amazo sinks as Oliver planned. He presumably kills Slade while Sara disappears overboard. Later, Oliver awakens in Hong Kong, where he meets Waller. In the present, the cure works on Roy. Sara arrives with Nyssa and the League to provide backup for Oliver, who gives Roy a red mask. They confront Slade and Isabel at Queen Consolidated. Nyssa murders Isabel and tells Oliver he needs to kill Slade, who escapes. Meanwhile, Diggle and Lyla free the Suicide Squad members and enlist their help in stopping the drone strike. Quentin is seriously injured. Thea meets up with Roy but, when she finds a bow and arrow, she loses trust in him and leaves Starling City with Merlyn. Oliver and his team successfully heal all of Slade's men. Oliver tricks Slade into kidnapping Felicity, believing she is Oliver's love. With Slade distracted, Felicity injects him with the cure. Oliver defeats Slade and Waller calls off the strike. Slade is locked in an underground A.R.G.U.S. prison on the island and Sara rejoins the League as payment for helping the city. Lyla is revealed to be pregnant by Diggle. Quentin collapses as a result of his injury.

== Cast and characters ==
=== Main ===
- Stephen Amell as Oliver Queen / Arrow
- Katie Cassidy as Laurel Lance
- David Ramsey as John Diggle
- Willa Holland as Thea Queen
- Emily Bett Rickards as Felicity Smoak
- Colton Haynes as Roy Harper
- Manu Bennett as Slade Wilson / Deathstroke
- Susanna Thompson as Moira Queen
- Paul Blackthorne as Quentin Lance

=== Recurring ===
- Kelly Hu as Chien Na Wei / China White
- Caity Lotz as Sara Lance/Canary
- John Barrowman as Malcolm Merlyn (Note: Also credited as a special guest star in "State v. Queen".)
- Jessica De Gouw as Helena Bertinelli / Huntress
- Colin Salmon as Walter Steele
- Roger Cross as Lucas Hilton
- Annie Ilonzeh as Joanna De La Vega
- Alex Kingston as Dinah Lance
- Jeffrey Nordling as Frank Bertinelli
- Celina Jade as Shado
- Adrian Holmes as Frank Pike
- Summer Glau as Isabel Rochev
- Kevin Alejandro as Sebastian Blood / Brother Blood
- Cynthia Addai-Robinson as Amanda Waller
- Teryl Rothery as Jean Loring
- Dylan Bruce as Adam Donner
- Bex Taylor-Klaus as Sin
- Dylan Neal as Anthony Ivo (Note: Also has an uncredited role in "Keep Your Enemies Closer".)
- Jimmy Jean-Louis as The Captain
- Nicholas Lea as Mark Francis
- Chelah Horsdal as Kate Spencer
- Jesse Hutch as Daily
- Audrey Marie Anderson as Lyla Michaels
- Sean Rogerson as Peter
- Artine Brown as Hendrick Von Arnim

=== Guest ===
- Michael Jai White as Ben Turner / Bronze Tiger
- Colin Donnell as Tommy Merlyn
- Grant Gustin as Barry Allen
- Seth Gabel as Cecil Adams / The Count
- Danielle Panabaker as Caitlin Snow
- Michael Rowe as Floyd Lawton / Deadshot
- Carlos Valdes as Cisco Ramon
- Eugene Lipinski as Alexi Leonov
- Ben Browder as Ted Gaynor / Blackhawk
- Michael Eklund as Barton Mathis / Dollmaker
- Robert Knepper as William Tockman / Clock King
- James Kidnie as Milo Armitage
- Katrina Law as Nyssa al Ghul
- Graham Shiels as Cyrus Gold / Solomon Grundy
- Navid Negahban as Al-Owal
- Sean Maher as Mark Scheffer / Shrapnel

== Production ==
=== Development ===
On February 11, 2013, The CW renewed Arrow for a second season for the 2013–14 season.

A backdoor pilot for The Flash was originally going to be the twentieth episode, but due to the positive reception of Grant Gustin's appearance in the eighth and ninth episode, executives at The CW scrapped it in favor a traditional pilot so that it gives the developers more time to flesh out the character in addition to receiving an increase in the budget.

=== Casting ===
Emily Bett Rickards, Colton Haynes and Manu Bennett were all promoted to series regulars. Jacqueline MacInnes Wood, who originally played Sara Lance in the pilot, did not return and was replaced by Caity Lotz.

=== Costume ===
In the second half of the second season, Oliver replaces his "paint" mask with a domino mask, similar to one worn by the character in the comics. The change is addressed on-screen, with Kreisberg saying, "He doesn't just put on a mask. It's actually a big plot point in an episode, and there really is a story behind, not only the need for the mask but also who provides him with it." On adding the mask now, Kreisberg stated that, "Conceptually, it was something we wanted to do because Oliver himself is evolving as the Arrow—from vigilante to hero, sort of from Arrow to Green Arrow—and we wanted to see that progression in his costume as well. As Oliver is embracing being a hero, being a hero means stepping out of the dark and being more of a symbol, so he has to take steps to conceal his identity more." He added that it will "allow the Arrow to interact with people who don't know his identity in a much more organic way than having him constantly keep his head down."

Costume designer Maya Mani put together roughly 50 mask options for the producers. Kreisberg said, "What's so wonderful about the design that Maya came up with is that it really is very simple, and it feels as if it's been part of his costume since the beginning...once we finally had this mask and put it on Stephen [Amell], even Stephen was like, 'This is the right one.'" In the episode "Three Ghosts", Oliver receives the mask from Barry Allen, who is able to create a mask that will help conceal his identity, while still being functional and allowing Oliver to see clearly.

=== Music ===
Arrow – Original Television Soundtrack: Season 2

Soundtrack album by Blake Neely
- Released: September 16, 2014
- Length: 71:31
- Label: WaterTower Music

Blake Neely chronology
Arrow – Original Television Soundtrack: Season 1	Arrow – Original Television Soundtrack: Season 2	Arrow – Original Television Soundtrack: Season 3

Arrow – Original Television Soundtrack: Season 2 track listing
No.	Title	Length
1.	"Time to Come Home"	1:51
2.	"I Don't Blame You"	2:06
3.	"A Different Way"	2:38
4.	"City of Heroes / Canary"	3:02
5.	"Love Is the Most Powerful Emotion"	1:53
6.	"Off of the Island, Onto a Freighter"	2:17
7.	"Building a Team"	2:07
8.	"Blind Spot"	2:46
9.	"Forced to Make a Choice / Slade's Metamorphosis"	2:51
10.	"The Scientist"	2:25
11.	"Roy Becomes a Hero"	2:58
12.	"Mirakuru Spreads / Brother Blood"	2:35
13.	"Heir to the Demon"	1:52
14.	"Get Your Soul Back"	2:27
15.	"This Ends Tonight"	2:02
16.	"Stay Away From Her"	2:07
17.	"Deathstroking / Creating an Army With a Needle"	4:07
18.	"Own Worst Enemy"	3:21
19.	"A.R.G.U.S.'s Suicide Squad"	2:08
20.	"Promise Kept"	3:44
21.	"The Man Under the Hood"	3:17
22.	"Secret Destiny"	2:57
23.	"In the Crosshairs"	3:10
24.	"Purest Heart"	1:43
25.	"The Essence of Heroism"	2:46
26.	"Tunnel Fight"	2:04
27.	"Never Again"	4:17
Total length:		71:31

== Release ==
=== Broadcast ===
The season began airing in the United States on The CW on October 10, 2013, and completed its 23-episode run on May 14, 2014.

=== Home media ===
Arrow: Season 2 was released as a 5-disc DVD set and as a 9-disc Blu-ray and DVD combo pack set on September 16, 2014 in the United States and September 15, 2014 in the United Kingdom. The DVD and Blu-ray box sets contain additional features, including making-of featurettes, deleted scenes, gag reel, and highlights from the Paley Fest.

== Reception ==
=== Critical response ===
The second season received favorable reviews. Jeff Jensen of Entertainment Weekly gave the first half of the second season a rating of B+, saying, "Arrow possesses an intelligence that shines through its TV-budget production values, which aren't too shabby. The writing is adult and witty, the action is exciting, and Amell holds the center with well-cultivated ease." The A.V. Club's Carrie Raisler gave the first half of the second season a rating of A−. She said, "Arrow [has] officially established itself as one of the most satisfying shows on television. The most satisfying thing of all is that it did so by respecting its characters... [Arrow respects] the character's comic-book roots in its overarching plotlines, all while using the network-appropriate soap-opera stories to do the heavy character lifting."

Rotten Tomatoes reported a 95% approval rating based on 265 reviews, with an average rating of 8.15/10. The site's consensus reading: "The second season of Arrow boasts more fantastic action, as well as a widening cast of intriguing, richly written characters."

=== Ratings ===
The second season averaged 3.28 million viewers across the 23 episodes, ranking 128th among television show viewership.

Viewership and ratings per episode of Arrow season 2
No.	Title	Air date	Rating/share (18–49)	Viewers (millions)	DVR (18–49)	Total (18–49)
1	"City of Heroes"	October 9, 2013	0.9/3	2.74	0.5	1.4
2	"Identity"	October 16, 2013	1.1/3	3.06	—N/a	—N/a
3	"Broken Dolls"	October 23, 2013	0.9/3	2.89	0.5	1.4
4	"Crucible"	October 30, 2013	0.8/2	2.37	0.5	1.3
5	"League of Assassins"	November 6, 2013	1.0/3	2.80	—N/a	—N/a
6	"Keep Your Enemies Closer"	November 13, 2013	1.2/3	3.09	—N/a	—N/a
7	"State v. Queen"	November 20, 2013	1.0/3	2.66	—N/a	—N/a
8	"The Scientist"	December 4, 2013	1.2/3	3.24	—N/a	—N/a
9	"Three Ghosts"	December 11, 2013	1.1/3	3.02	—N/a	—N/a
10	"Blast Radius"	January 15, 2014	0.9/3	2.52	0.6	1.5
11	"Blind Spot"	January 22, 2014	0.9/2	2.49	0.6	1.5
12	"Tremors"	January 29, 2014	1.1/3	2.95	0.5	1.6
13	"Heir to the Demon"	February 5, 2014	1.0/3	2.86	0.5	1.5
14	"Time of Death"	February 26, 2014	0.9/3	2.45	—N/a	—N/a
15	"The Promise"	March 5, 2014	0.7/2	2.21	0.5	1.2
16	"Suicide Squad"	March 19, 2014	0.8/3	2.42	0.5	1.3
17	"Birds of Prey"	March 26, 2014	0.9/3	2.62	—N/a	—N/a
18	"Deathstroke"	April 2, 2014	0.8/3	2.32	0.5	1.3
19	"The Man Under the Hood"	April 16, 2014	0.7/2	2.26	0.4	1.1
20	"Seeing Red"	April 23, 2014	0.7/2	2.19	0.5	1.2
21	"City of Blood"	April 30, 2014	0.8/3	2.31	—N/a	—N/a
22	"Streets of Fire"	May 7, 2014	0.8/2	2.33	—N/a	—N/a
23	"Unthinkable"	May 14, 2014	0.9/3	2.37	—N/a	—N/a

=== Accolades ===
Arrow, season 2 award nominations
Year	Award	Category	Nominee(s)	Result	Ref.
2014	Constellation Awards	Best Male Performance in a 2013 Science Fiction Television Episode	Stephen Amell ("The Odyssey")	Nominated	
2014	Constellation Awards	Best Science Fiction Television Series of 2013	Arrow	Nominated	
2014	IGN Awards	Best TV Action Series	Arrow	Won	
2014	IGN Awards	Best TV Hero	Oliver Queen	People's Choice	
2014	Leo Awards	Best Cinematography Dramatic Series	Gordon Verheul ("Sacrifice")	Nominated	
2014	Leo Awards	Best Dramatic Series	Greg Berlanti, Joseph P. Finn, Marc Guggenheim, Andrew Kreisberg, Wendy Mericle	Nominated	
2014	Leo Awards	Best Lead Performance by a Male Dramatic Series	Stephen Amell ("Crucible")	Nominated	
2014	Leo Awards	Best Lead Performance by a Female Dramatic Series	Emily Bett Rickards ("Three Ghosts")	Nominated	
2014	Leo Awards	Best Make-Up Dramatic Series	Danielle Fowler ("Keep Your Enemies Closer")	Nominated	
2014	Leo Awards	Best Stunt Coordination Dramatic Series	J. J. Makaro ("The Scientist")	Nominated	
2014	People's Choice Awards	Favorite Sci-Fi/Fantasy TV Actor	Stephen Amell	Nominated	
2014	Satellite Awards	Satellite Award for Best Television Series – Genre	Arrow	Nominated	
2014	Saturn Awards	Best Youth-Oriented Television Series	Arrow	Nominated	
2014	Teen Choice Awards	Choice Sci-Fi/Fantasy TV Show	Arrow	Nominated	
2014	Teen Choice Awards	Choice TV Female Breakout Star	Emily Bett Rickards	Nominated	
2014	Young Hollywood Awards	Super Superhero	Stephen Amell	Nominated	
2015	PRISM Awards	Performance in a Drama Multi-Episode Storyline	Katie Cassidy	Won	
