= State v. Queen =

- Arrow episode
- Episode no.: Season 2 Episode 7
- Directed by: Bethany Rooney
- Written by: Marc Guggenheim; Drew Z. Greenberg
- Cinematography by: Glen Winter
- Editing by: Paul Karasick
- Production code: 2J7457
- Original air date: November 20, 2013
- Running time: 42:13

Guest appearances
- Kevin Alejandro as Sebastian Blood; Celina Jade as Shado; Caity Lotz as Sara Lance; Jimmy Jean-Louis as "The Captain"; Michael Eklund as Barton Mathis; Dylan Bruce as Adam Donner; Chelah Horsdal as Kate Spencer; Jesse Hutch as Officer Daily; Dylan Neal as Anthony Ivo; Teryl Rothery as Jean Loring; Graham Shiels as Cyrus Gold; Seth Gabel as Cecil Adams; John Barrowman as Malcolm Merlyn

Episode chronology
← Previous "Keep Your Enemies Closer"	Next → "The Scientist"
- Arrow season 2

"State v. Queen" is the seventh episode of the second season, and 30th episode overall of The CW series Arrow. The episode was written by co-developer Marc Guggenheim & co-executive producer Drew Z. Greenberg and directed by Bethany Rooney. It first aired on The CW on November 20, 2013.

This episode focuses on Moira Queen's acquittal for her alleged crimes at the end of the first season, ending with the revelation that Malcolm Merlyn is Thea Queen's father, not Robert Queen as previously thought.

The episode received generally positive reviews from critics.

== Plot ==
It is revealed that The Count escaped from prison, where he was transferred after recovering from his psychosis, during the earthquake. Afterwards, the Count begins poisoning civilians with the Vertigo drug; Diggle and the Assistant District Attorney are among the infected. The Count reveals in a broadcast that the cure to the sickness is to take Vertigo. In the court, Laurel uses an affair between Moira and Malcolm to cast doubts on Moira's defense. Felicity is captured by the Count. In order to protect Felicity from being injected with Vertigo, Oliver is forced to kill the Count. Meanwhile, Blood, revealed to have hired the Count to kill the vigilante, now known as Arrow, is informed that one of his test subjects named Cyrus Gold has survived his injection, feeling "stronger". Ultimately, Moira is exonerated by the jury; she later learns that Malcolm, alive and well, had rigged the trial. He also reveals that he now knows Thea is his biological daughter. In a flashback to the island, Shado and Slade rescue Oliver and Sara, after Dr. Ivo and his men travel to the island to locate the Hosen, the stone arrowhead, which contains coordinates to the wreckage of the Japanese submarine.

== Production ==
Preparation ran from September 9 until September 17, 2013. Shooting ran from September 18 until September 27, 2013.

== Reception ==
=== Ratings ===
The episode was watched live by 2.66 million viewers, and had a ratings share of 1.0.

The episode attracted 1,031,000 viewers upon its British premiere, making it the most watched programme on Sky One for the week.

=== Critical response ===
Professional ratings
Aggregate scores
Source	Rating
Rotten Tomatoes (Average Score)	6.6
Rotten Tomatoes (Tomatometer)	82%
Review scores
Source	Rating
The A.V. Club	B+
Den of Geek	1/5 stars
IGN	7.4

The review aggregator website Rotten Tomatoes reported an 82% approval rating for the episode, based on 11 reviews, with an average rating of 6.6/10.

Alasdair Wilkins of The A.V. Club rated the episode B+, complimenting "how well Arrow can juggle its labyrinthine continuity" in response to the return of the "Broken Dolls", as well as Stephen Amell's "subtle acting" after killing the Count. The main event of the episode, the titular trial was described as a "letdown" by Wilkins due to the underwhelming revelation that Moira Queen had a brief affair with Malcolm Merlyn. Wilkins is optimistic about the future, noting the verdict as an "intriguing test of Arrow's storytelling discipline to see how it develops that idea".

Mike Cecchini of Den of Geek rated the episode one out of five stars, describing it as a "major misstep" and "a tremendous step backwards". Cecchini criticized the absurdness of the Count's storyline. However, Cecchini complimented Malcolm Merlyn's dramatic return and two well-placed moments of utter competency for Felicity Smoak which established her inclusion on the team and lightens the tone.

Jesse Schedeen of IGN rated the episode 7.4, noting that Count Vertigo let the episode down with "bad acting and "copycat Joker" writing". Schedeen praised the writers use of Ollie's new vow against killing to great effect in this episode.
