= Cali Timmins =

Canadian former actress (born 1963)

- Born: April 27, 1963 (age 63); Montreal, Quebec, Canada
- Other name: Carolyn Timmins
- Occupation: Actress
- Years active: 1980–2000
- Children: 2
- Relatives: Margo Timmins (sister); Noah Timmins (paternal grandfather)

Cali Timmins (born April 27, 1963) is a Canadian former actress, perhaps best known for her role in the soap opera Ryan's Hope as Maggie Shelby from 1983 to 1989.

== Career ==
Television

As Carolyn Timmins, her first credited screen role was on the CBC Television sitcom Hangin' In playing Susan in the 1981 episode "Pressure Point." After a couple of appearances on the short-lived soap opera Loving Friends and Perfect Couples (1983), and two feature film roles, she landed a spot in the cast of Ryan's Hope as Maggie Shelby (1983–1989).

In addition to her regular role on Ryan's Hope, Timmins played Maggie Davenport in Katts and Dog for the 1988–1989 season, and she was the first Paulina Cantrell Cory in Another World from 1990 to 1991.

In the 1990s, Timmins began making guest appearances on television series. In 1993 she had roles on Forever Knight as Lili, Walker, Texas Ranger as Ally Slade, Street Legal as the recurring character Deborah Lowry, and Kung Fu: The Legend Continues as Valerie Mitchell, the only woman permitted to join the Shaolin Temple to learn from Caine and other masters. That same year, she guest starred on Counterstrike as Yvonne, Peter Sinclair's lover, who she sets up to be abducted in exchange for paying off her gambling debts in "The Hit." In 1994 she appeared on Highlander: The Series as Iris, RoboCop as Tish, Due South as Julie, and as Bennett in the television film Green Dolphin Beat. Her 1995 roles include Mary Anne on the Frasier "...Show Where Diane Comes Back," Barbie Lippin on Murder, She Wrote, and Carlotta in the TekWar episode, "Carlotta's Room." In 1996 she appeared on both Baywatch and Cybill, and played Rebecca Simons on The Pretender in 2000. She had roles in several other television films between 1995 and 1998, including Fiona Dahl in Heaven's Fire (1999).

Film

In addition to television movies, Timmins appeared in a few theatrical films, including Spacehunter: Adventures in the Forbidden Zone as Nova (1983), The Hotel New Hampshire as Bitty Tuck (1984), The Takeover as Kathy (1994), and Hard Evidence as Dina Davis (1995).

== Personal life ==
Three of Cali's siblings, Michael, Margo and Peter Timmins, are in the country rock band Cowboy Junkies. Their grandfather, Noah Timmins, was a pioneering mining executive whose name was given to the city of Timmins, Ontario.

== Filmography ==
Cali Timmins film and television credits
Year	Title	Role	Notes	Ref.
1981	Hangin' In	Susan	Episode: "Pressure Point" (credited as Carolyn Timmins)	
1983	Spacehunter: Adventures in the Forbidden Zone	Nova	Theatrical film	
1983	Loving Friends and Perfect Couples	Unknown	2 episodes	
1984	The Hotel New Hampshire	Bitty Tuck	Theatrical film	
1983–1988, 1989	Ryan's Hope	Maggie Shelby Greenberg Coleridge	Regular cast	
1988–1989	Katts and Dog	Maggie Davenport	16 episodes (AKA Rin Tin Tin: K-9 Cop)	
1990–1991	Another World	Paulina Cantrell Cory	Regular cast	
1992	Secret Service	Tanya Peterson	Episode: "It's in the Mail/Counterfeit Murder"	
1993	Beyond Reality	Billie Hanes	1 episode	
1993	Forever Knight	Lili	Episode: "1966"	
1993	Counterstrike	Yvonne Strait	Episode: "The Hit"	
1993	Kung Fu: The Legend Continues	Valerie Mitchell	Episode: "Reunion"	
1993	Walker, Texas Ranger	Ally Slade	Episode: "She'll Do to Ride the River With"	
1993–1994	Street Legal	Deborah Lowry	3 episodes	
1994	Highlander: The Series	Iris	Episode: "The Fighter"	
1994	RoboCop	Tish	Episode: "Illusions"	
1994	Green Dolphin Beat	Bennett	Television film	
1994	Due South	Julie	Episode: "Manhunt"	
1994	The Takeover	Kathy	Theatrical film (direct to video)	
1995	Murder, She Wrote	Barbie Lippin	Episode: "Film Flam"	
1995	TekWar	Carlotta	Episode: "Carlotta's Room"	
1995	Hard Evidence	Dina Davis	Theatrical film	
1995	Fast Company	Sharon Fleming	Television film	
1995	Frasier	Mary Anne	Episode: "The Show Where Diane Comes Back"	
1996	Cybill	Rebecca	Episode: "When You're Hot, You're Hot"	
1996	Baywatch	Tammy	Episodes: "The Contest", "Liquid Assets"	
1996	The Takeover	Kathy	Theatrical film	
1996	Sealed with a Kiss	Christine Bellows	Television film	
1998	The Heist	Janice Simmons	Television film (AKA Hostile Force)	
1998	Catch Me If You Can	Kid's Mother	Television film	
1999	Heaven's Fire	Fiona Dahl	Television film	
2000	The Pretender	Rebecca Simons	Episode: "Rules of Engagement"	
