= Minniver =

Minniver is a surname.

== List of people with the surname ==
=== Fictional characters ===
- Maxine Minniver, from the British soap opera Hollyoaks
- Minnie Minniver, from the British soap opera Hollyoaks
- Mitzeee Minniver, from the British soap opera Hollyoaks
- Trish Minniver, from the British soap opera Hollyoaks

== See also ==
- Miniver
- Mrs. Miniver
- Mrs. Miniver (character)
- Mrs. Miniver (1960 film)
- Mrs. Miniver's problem
