= Mia Dillon =

American actress (born 1955)

- Born: July 9, 1955 (age 71); Colorado Springs, Colorado
- Occupation: Actress
- Years active: 1979–present
- Spouse: Keir Dullea (m. 1999)

Mia Dillon (born July 9, 1955) is an American actress.

== Early life ==
Dillon was born July 9, 1955, in Colorado Springs, Colorado; her family moved to the Philadelphia area when she was a child. Growing up, she desired to become an actress from when she was ten years old, and she studied acting at Penn State. She commuted to New York, auditioning for "low- or no-pay 'showcases'", while she supported herself with jobs that included being a waitress, taking ticket orders for the Metropolitan Opera Guild, and working as an office temp. Eventually she was cast as an understudy in the 1976 Off-Broadway production The Shortchanged Review, at the Mitzi E. Newhouse Theater.

== Career ==
Dillon made her Broadway debut as an understudy for the roles of Jill Mason and the Nurse in Peter Shaffer's Equus in 1977. She was nominated for the 1980 Drama Desk Award for Outstanding Featured Actress in a Play for Once a Catholic, and the 1982 Tony Award for Best Featured Actress in a Play for Crimes of the Heart. Her other theater credits include Agnes of God, The Corn is Green, Hay Fever, Come Back, Little Sheba, Three Sisters, and Our Town. In 1985 Dillon performed in a staged reading of the novel Breaker Boys at Pennsylvania's Showcase Theatre.

On television, Dillon was featured in Mary and Rhoda and has appeared in guest roles in episodes of three different series in the Law & Order franchise. Her screen credits include The Money Pit, A Shock to the System, Gods and Generals, and Duane Hopwood. Dillon was also featured in the Disney Channel TV movie Lots of Luck, alongside Annette Funicello and Martin Mull.

== Personal life ==
Dillon married actor Keir Dullea in 1999.

== Filmography ==
=== Film ===
Year	Title	Role	Notes
1979	Night-Flowers	Casey	
1986	The Money Pit	Marika	
1990	A Shock to the System	Graham's Secretary	
2003	Gods and Generals	Jane Beale	
2005	Duane Hopwood	Female Judge	
2007	First Born	Party Guest #2	
2009	All Me, All the Time	Sharon	
2010	All Good Things	Katie's Aunt	
2013	Isn't It Delicious	Molly	
2016	Ordinary World	Joan	
2017	April Flowers	Ms. Moore	
2020	Never Rarely Sometimes Always	Women's Centre Director	
2023	Are You There God? It's Me, Margaret.	Mary Hutchins	
2025	Sit with Me While I Die	Gwen	Short film

=== Television ===
Year	Title	Role	Notes
1980	The Molders of Troy	Sister	TV movie
1980	The Jilting of Granny Weatherall	Hapsy	TV movie
1985	Lots of Luck	Jessie Foley	TV movie
1990	Fine Things	Tracy	TV movie
1992, 1997, 2001, 2009	Law & Order	Various roles	4 episodes
1999	Cosby	Mrs. Harris	Episode: "The Party's Over"
2000	Mary and Rhoda	Mother	TV movie
2001	Law & Order: Special Victims Unit	Mrs. Jansen	Episode: "Sacrifice"
2002	Law & Order: Criminal Intent	Barb Windemere	Episode: "Faith"
2003	Our Town	Mrs. Soames	TV movie
2004	The Jury	Dr. Sullivan	3 episodes
2016	BrainDead	Nora Ritter	2 episodes
2025	Elsbeth	Sister Frances	Episode: "And Then There Were Nuns"
