= Beulah Garrick =

British actress (born 1921)

- Born: 12 June 1921 (age 105); Nottingham, England
- Occupation: Actress
- Years active: 1946–2004
- Notable work: Dog Day Afternoon
- Spouse: Bernard Pollock (m. 1961; died 2016)

Beulah Garrick (born 12 June 1921) is a British retired actress who appeared in films, television series, theatre plays, and commercials.

== Early life ==
Beulah Garrick was born in Nottingham, England, and was encouraged to act by her mother, who along with her husband, was interested in show business and entertainment. She had two older brothers. Garrick started out in theatre in the 1940s. She attended Catholic boarding school.

== Career ==
In the 1950s, Garrick was considered to be "one of the top British character actresses". She played Mrs. Donner in a 1958 TV movie version of Johnny Belinda, with a cast that included Julie Harris and Christopher Plummer. In 1960, Garrick portrayed the housemaid Gladys in a TV movie version of Mrs. Miniver, which starred Maureen O'Hara and Leo Genn. In 1975, she played the role of Margaret in Dog Day Afternoon, one of the bank workers being taken hostage by Al Pacino's character.

Between 1981 and 1983, Garrick appeared in several episodes of the American soap opera Guiding Light. Throughout her career, she appeared in numerous Broadway productions.

== Personal life ==
Garrick turned 100 on 12 June 2021. In 1961, she married Bernard Pollock, an actor and stage manager; they lived in Manhattan and East Hampton, Long Island. Widowed since 2016, when her husband died aged 96, she lives in the Northwest Woods area of East Hampton.
