= The Scientist (Arrow) =

- Arrow episode
- Promotional poster
- Episode no.: Season 2 Episode 8
- Directed by: Michael Schultz
- Story by: Greg Berlanti; Andrew Kreisberg
- Teleplay by: Geoff Johns; Andrew Kreisberg
- Cinematography by: Gordon Verheul
- Editing by: Andi Armaganian
- Production code: 2J7458
- Original air date: December 4, 2013
- Running time: 42:13

Guest appearances
- Grant Gustin as Barry Allen; Kevin Alejandro as Sebastian Blood; Celina Jade as Shado; Caity Lotz as Sara Lance; Summer Glau as Isabel Rochev; Bex Taylor-Klaus as Sin; Jesse Hutch as Officer Daily; Dylan Neal as Anthony Ivo; Graham Shiels as Cyrus Gold; John Barrowman as Malcolm Merlyn

Episode chronology
| ← Previous "State v. Queen" | Next → "Three Ghosts" |
- Arrow season 2

"The Scientist" is the eighth episode of the second season of the American television series Arrow, based on the DC Comics character Green Arrow, revolving around billionaire playboy Oliver Queen as he returns to Starling City, after having been shipwrecked for five years, and becomes a bow-wielding, hooded vigilante who sets out to fight crime and corruption. It is set in the Arrowverse, sharing continuity with the other television series of the universe. The episode was written by co-developer Andrew Kreisberg and Geoff Johns from a story by co-developer Greg Berlanti and Kreisberg, and directed by Michael Schultz.

Stephen Amell stars as Oliver, alongside Katie Cassidy, David Ramsey, Willa Holland, Emily Bett Rickards, Colton Haynes, Manu Bennett, Susanna Thompson, and Paul Blackthorne. The episode also serves as a backdoor pilot to the spin-off series The Flash, with the introduction of guest star Grant Gustin as Barry Allen, who arrives in Starling City to personally investigate a superhuman-related crime.

"The Scientist" originally aired on The CW on December 4, 2013, and was watched by 3.24 million viewers according to Nielsen Media Research. It had a season high viewership and a series high 18–34 rating. The episode was met with positive reviews from critics.

== Plot ==
When a masked thief with superhuman strength steals a centrifuge from Queen Consolidated, Central City crime scene investigator Barry Allen arrives to help the investigation. Later, he reveals that he is searching for super-powered beings in the hope that he will find the murderer of his mother, and exonerate his father for the accusation. In addition, Barry is also a fan of the Arrow's exploits. Oliver realizes that the thief was enhanced using the same serum that Ivo was searching for. Roy starts helping Sin find her missing friend, who was a failed subject of Blood's experiment. Oliver shoots Roy in the leg in order to prevent him getting further involved. Oliver tracks the thief and discovers its Cyrus, while tacking him Oliver gets injected with an unknown toxin. In order to save Oliver's life, Felicity reveals his identity to Barry in order to help find an antidote. Meanwhile, Merlyn puts pressure on Moira to tell the truth to Thea. Moira instead contacts Ra's, who wants to kill Merlyn for breaking the League's code by destroying the Glades. As a result, Merlyn leaves. In a flashback to the island, Oliver and Shado find the serum, but when they inject it to Slade without the required sedative, his heart stops, just as Ivo arrives with his men.

== Production ==
Preparation ran from September 19 until September 27, 2013. Shooting ran from September 30 until October 9, 2013. The episode also serves as a backdoor pilot to the spin-off series The Flash, with the introduction of Barry Allen, played by guest star Grant Gustin.

== Release ==
"The Scientist" was first aired in the United States on The CW on December 4, 2013. It was aired alongside the U.S. broadcast in Canada on CTV, while it was first aired in the United Kingdom on Sky 1 on December 9, 2013. The episode, along with the rest of the second season, was released on Blu-ray and DVD on September 16, 2014, and began streaming on Netflix in the United States on October 8, 2014.

== Reception ==
=== Ratings ===
In the United States, the episode received a 1.2/3 percent share among adults between the ages of 18 and 49, meaning that it was seen by 1.2 percent of all households, and 3 percent of all of those watching television at the time of the broadcast. It was watched by 3.24 million viewers. The episode was the most viewed of season two, and had the show's largest audience since February 2013, and a series high 18–34 rating (1.2/4). It also matched the show's season high 18–49 rating and matched its series high rating among men 18–34 (1.4/6) and men 18–49 (1.5/5). The Canadian broadcast gained 1.87 million viewers, the second highest for that night and the eight highest for the week.

=== Critical response ===
The review aggregator website Rotten Tomatoes reported a 90% approval rating for the episode, based on 10 reviews, with an average rating of 8.45/10. Jesse Schedeen of IGN scored the episode an 8.5 out of 10, praising the emergence of super-powers and flashbacks but questioning Gustin's ability to hold his own. Mike Cecchini for Den of Geek scored the episode 4.5 stars out of 5. Caroline Preece, also for Den of Geek, gave a positive review as well.

Collider's Dave Trumbore gave the episode an "A−" grade. Morgan Jeffery at Digital Spy, gave the episode a perfect 5 star rating out of 5. Alasdair Wilkins of The A.V. Club graded the episode a 'B'. Mark Rozeman of Paste magazine gave a positive review of the episode.
