= The Next One (film) =

Full length film

The Next One is a science fiction film starring Keir Dullea and Adrienne Barbeau released in 1984, and directed by Nico Mastorakis. It was released in the United States as The Time Traveler.

== Plot summary ==
The Next One is a film in which the recent widow of an American astronaut finds Glen — a man with uncanny powers and lost in space and time — on the beach of her retreat on a Greek Island.

== Reception ==
Colin Greenland reviewed The Next One for Imagine magazine, and stated that "An awkward movie, but a thoughtful attempt to connect ancient and modern mythology."
