= The Takeover (film) =

- Directed by: Troy Cook
- Written by: Gene Mitchell
- Produced by: Cheryl Cook; Michael Woods
- Starring: Billy Drago; John Savage; Nick Mancuso; Eric Da Re; Cali Timmins
- Music by: Jimmy Lifton
- Distributed by: Artisan Entertainment
- Release date: 1995
- Running time: 91 minutes
- Country: United States
- Language: English

The Takeover is a 1995 action film directed by Troy Cook and starring Billy Drago and Nick Mancuso as rival drug lords. David Amos and Gene Mitchell play good-guys who try to intervene in the turf war.

== Cast ==
- Billy Drago as Daniel Stein
- John Savage as Greg
- Nick Mancuso as Anthony Vilachi
- Eric Da Re as Venokur
- Cali Timmins as Kathy
- David Amos as Jonathan Fitzsimmons
- Gene Mitchell as Mickey Lane
- Tony Longo as Waldo
- Anita Barone as Cindy Lane
- Manu Tupou as Manu
- Greg Lewis as Vic
- Sam Scarber as D.E. Moore
- James A. Donzell as Steins Associate
- Arlene Rodriguez as Brandi

== Subsequent arrest and convictions ==
In 2000 co-producer Michael Woods and co-star David Amos would be arrested for the 1989 murder of Horace McKenna. McKenna was a partner of Woods in two strip clubs in Los Angeles, The Bare Elegance and The New Jet Strip. After the film was made the detectives started to question associates of the two when it was realized that much of the plot of the film was based around the murder of McKenna.

During the 2001 trial Amos would give testimony against Woods in exchange for a lighter sentence.
