= Mail Order Bride (1964 film) =

1964 film by Burt Kennedy

- Directed by: Burt Kennedy
- Screenplay by: Burt Kennedy
- Based on: "Mail Order Bride"; 1952 story in The Saturday Evening Post by Van Cort
- Produced by: Richard E. Lyons
- Starring: Buddy Ebsen; Keir Dullea; Lois Nettleton; Warren Oates
- Cinematography: Paul C. Vogel
- Edited by: Frank Santillo
- Music by: George Bassman
- Color process: Metrocolor
- Production company: Metro-Goldwyn-Mayer
- Distributed by: Metro-Goldwyn-Mayer
- Release date: March 11, 1964
- Running time: 83 minutes
- Country: United States
- Language: English
- Budget: $700,000
- Box office: $1,250,000 (US/ Canada)

Mail Order Bride is a 1964 American Western comedy film directed by Burt Kennedy and starring Buddy Ebsen, Keir Dullea and Lois Nettleton. The screenplay concerns an old man who pressures the wild son of a dead friend into marrying a mail-order bride in an attempt to settle him down.

Burt Kennedy called it " a moneymaking picture—a little picture, but a moneymaker."

== Plot ==
Retired lawman Will Lane promises to look after a dying friend's son. He is given the deed to the man's Montana ranch and instructed not to let the friend's son, Lee Carey, have it until Lee gives up his immature ways.

One provision is that Lee must marry. Will uses a catalog to look for a suitable wife. He ends up finding Annie Boley, a widow in Kansas City with a six-year-old son, working in a saloon for Hanna, who originally placed the ad in the catalog.

Lee agrees to marry her, with ranch hand Jace as his best man, but assures Annie that their marriage will be in name only, with no other marital obligations. Will learns that Jace has been stealing cattle. Lee refuses to believe it until Jace proposes they rustle together and leave the ranch in ruins.

When Jace starts a fire with the boy still inside the house, Lee rescues him and comes to his senses. An angry Will believes Lee conspired with Jace to steal the herd and disgustedly gives him the deed. But Lee realizes he cares for his new family and asks Will to help him get back the cattle. They corner Jace in town and in a shootout Jace is killed.

Lee vows to rebuild the ranch and Will rides back to Kansas City to court Hanna.

== Cast ==
- Buddy Ebsen as Will Lane
- Keir Dullea as Lee Carey
- Lois Nettleton as Annie Boley
- Warren Oates as Jace
- BarBara Luna as Marietta (as Barbara Luna)
- Paul Fix as Sheriff Jess Linley
- Marie Windsor as Hanna
- Denver Pyle as Preacher Pope
- William Smith as Lank
- Kathleen Freeman as Sister Sue
- Abigail Shelton as Young Old Maid
- Jim Mathers as Matt Boley (as James Mathers)
- Doodles Weaver as Charlie Mary
- Diane Sayer as Lily Fontaine
- Ted Ryan as Bartender

== Reception ==
In his June 11, 1964 review in The New York Times, Howard Thompson described it as "a curious little Western drama… (that) shapes up steadily as a tart, perceptive and amusing character study snugly pegged on reality and real people…" He was less enthusiastic about the ending, calling it "a pretentious, dramatic wind-up all but spoils the picaresque flavoring of some dandy vignettes, such as the slapdash marriage ceremony." However, he said "every line of Mr. Kennedy's lean dialogue edges the picture forward and several scenes are like strung pearls. The best ones involve Marie Windsor, as a wistful saloon owner, and young Barbara Luna, who does a beautifully shaded bit… it is the laconic restraint of Mr. Ebsen, straight from 'The Beverly Hillbillies,' that continually steadies the picture. If only Grandpa had whipped out a hammer and nailed it down tight".

== See also ==
- List of American films of 1964
