= Loving Friends and Perfect Couples =

- Starring: Keir Dullea; Ross Petty; Lisa Howard; Mimi Kuzyk; Cali Timmins; Paul Hecht
- Country of origin: Canada
- No. of seasons: 1

Production
- Running time: 30 minutes

Original release
- Network: First Choice; Global; ONTV

Loving Friends and Perfect Couples is a Canadian television soap opera, which aired in 1983. Originally aired on the pay TV network First Choice, the series was later rerun on Global in 1985.

The show was billed as an "adult" prime time soap opera, including unedited nudity, profanity and simulated sex, and was ultimately a parody of soap operas similar to Mary Hartman, Mary Hartman.

In the United States, the series aired on subscription television service ONTV.

The show's cast included Keir Dullea, Ross Petty, Lisa Howard, Mimi Kuzyk, Alex Amini, Lori Hallier and Cali Timmins.
