= Three Dangerous Ladies =

- Directed by: Alvin Rakoff; Don Thompson; Robert Fuest
- Screenplay by: Hugh Whitemore; Robert Bloch; Robert Fuest
- Based on: Mrs. Amworth by E.F. Benson; The Mannikin by Robert Bloch; The Island by L.P. Hartley
- Produced by: William F. Deneen; Jim Hanley
- Starring: Glynis Johns; John Phillips; Ronee Blakley; Keir Dullea; John Hurt; Charles Gray
- Cinematography: Bob Edwards; Dennis Miller
- Edited by: Christopher Castellyn; Alex Kirby; Terry Maisey
- Music by: Ronee Blakley; Paul Lewis; Harry Manfredini; Arlon Ober
- Production company: Highgate Pictures
- Release date: 1977
- Running time: 84 minutes
- Countries: United Kingdom; Canada
- Language: English

Three Dangerous Ladies is a 1977 British-Canadian horror anthology film composed of three episodes of the six-part Harlech Television and The Ontario Educational Communications Authority co-produced series of half-hour television films titled Classics Dark and Dangerous. The three segments, Mrs. Amworth, The Mannikin and The Island, were directed, respectively, by Alvin Rakoff, Don Thompson, and Robert Fuest. The cast includes Glynis Johns, John Phillips, Ronee Blakley, Keir Dullea, John Hurt and Charles Gray.

== Plot ==
There is no framing narrative, but each segment is introduced by an off-screen narrator who emphasizes the link of "dangerous ladies"

=== Mrs. Amworth ===
(Directed by Alvin Rakoff; written by Hugh Whitemore based on Ms. Amworth by E. F. Benson, from the 1923 collection Visible and Invisible.)
Mrs. Amworth (Glynis Johns) is a vivacious, sociable middle-aged woman in a small English town which is currently experiencing a mysterious anemia epidemic. Amworth presides over neighborly garden parties and card games, but Francis Urcombe (John Phillips), a local student of the occult, suspects she may have something to do with the mysterious ailment which has begun afflicting a friend's nephew and others in the village. After he discovers her reaching through the young man's window, he reveals that he believes she is a vampire. He confronts her, resulting in her apparent death when she is struck by a passing car. She reappears to inflict further harm, however, leading Urcombe to the local cemetery, where he waits for her spirit to return to her grave and then exhumes her body and impales it with a pickaxe, killing her.

=== The Mannikin ===
(Directed by Don Thompson; written by Robert Bloch based on his story The Mannikin, first published in the April 1937 issue of Weird Tales)
Folk musician Simone (Ronee Blakley) returns to the house of her estranged mother, who is recently deceased. She refuses to attend the funeral or take any belongings, explaining that her mother subjected her to sinister ritualistic elements including seances as a child, before she was removed from the home. Shortly thereafter, she begins experiencing unexplained phenomena; she hears her mother's voice calling her name, starts suffering from disorienting dizzy spells and comes down with an excruciating pain in her back. She is referred to psychiatrist Dr. David Priestly (Keir Dullea), who believes her symptoms to be psychiatric in nature. Eventually, Simone returns to her mother's home, where the strange housekeeper Miss Smith (Pol Pelletier) conducts a ritual which causes a grotesque, childlike creature to crawl out of Simone's back. When Dr. Priestly arrives looking for her, Simone tells him to leave in a stilted manner. When he does, he is attacked by the creature in his car.

The segment features Blakley playing her song Need a New Sun Rising. Bloch's screenplay differs considerably from his original short story.

=== The Island ===
(Directed by Robert Fuest; written by Robert Fuest based on The Island, by L.P. Hartley, first published in his 1924 collection Night Fears)
A soldier named Lt. Simmonds (John Hurt) travels (with difficulty, since the boatman from the mainland is uncooperative) to the island mansion of his married lover Mrs. Santander (Jenny Runacre). A portrait of her hangs upon the wall. Upon arriving, however, the evasive butler (Graham Crowden) tells him that Mrs. Santander will not see him immediately, and while waiting he encounters an "electrician" (Charles Gray) (of whom the butler denies all knowledge) who eventually reveals his true identity: Mr. Santander, the cuckolded husband of Mrs Santander. The butler had told Simmonds that Mr Santander was away in South America. Santander invites Simmonds to a drink, where he rants at him that his pretending to be an electrician was "a charade" and that his wife had many lovers, of whom Simmonds was 'the least' and that she had only ever mentioned Simmonds once. He then shows Simmonds that he hurt his finger, and beckons him into another room to show him why. Revealing Mrs. Santander's lifeless body seated in a chair, Santander says he caught his finger while moving her dead body. He leaves the room. The butler comes in, appearing shocked that Mrs Santander is dead, and closes her eyes. He says he will phone the police. Simmonds, attempting to leave, notices that his revolver is missing a bullet, and suspects that Santander used it to murder his wife while Simmonds bathed. As he searches the house for the murderous husband, the butler informs him that the police are on their way. When he demands to know where Santander is, the butler replies, "Mr. Santander, sir? Why, he's in South America." A possible implication is that the two have conspired to frame Simmonds for the murder, although another implication may be that Simmonds has gone mad, killed Mrs Santander and imagined the presence of Mr Santander.

== Cast (by segment) ==
Mrs. Amworth

- Glynis Johns as Mrs. Amworth
- John Phillips as Urcombe
- Derek Francis as Benson
- Pip Miller as David

The Mannikin

- Ronee Blakley as Simone
- Keir Dullea as Dr. David Priestly
- Pol Pelletier as Miss Smith
- Cec Linder as Dr. Carstairs

The Island

- John Hurt as Lt. Simmonds
- Graham Crowden as The Butler
- Charles Gray as Mr. Santander
- Jenny Runacre as Mrs. Santander

== Release ==
Though the three segments were originally aired on the CBC in Canada and ITV in England as part of the 6-part CBC series Classics Dark and Dangerous, they were re-packaged for video by S&B Marketing in 1988. The Segment Mrs. Amworth also received a standalone VHS release through LCA in the UK. The segments, as well as other Classics Dark and Dangerous titles, were shown in the Canadian educational system with an accompanying text published by the Ontario Educational Communications Authority.
