= Give Us Barabbas! =

1961 film directed by George Schaefer

Give Us Barabbas! is a 1961 American TV movie. It was written by Henry Denker and directed by George Schaefer. It was an original script for Hallmark Hall of Fame which was rare because that show specialised in adaptations.

== Cast ==
- James Daly as Barabbas
- Kim Hunter as Mara
- Dennis King as Pontius Pilate
- Robinson Stone as Phineas
- Leonardo Cimino as Caleb
- Ludwig Donath as Joseph
- Keir Dullea as Elisha
- Muni Seroff as Samuel
- Toni Darnay as Mary
- John Straub as John
- John Gerstad as Lemuel

== Reception ==
The Los Angeles Times said the film provided a "tour de force" for Daly who gave "a marvellous characterization." The New York Times said it had "great power".

The show was repeated.
