= Wai Ching Ho =

Hong Kong actress (1943–2026)

- 何煒晴
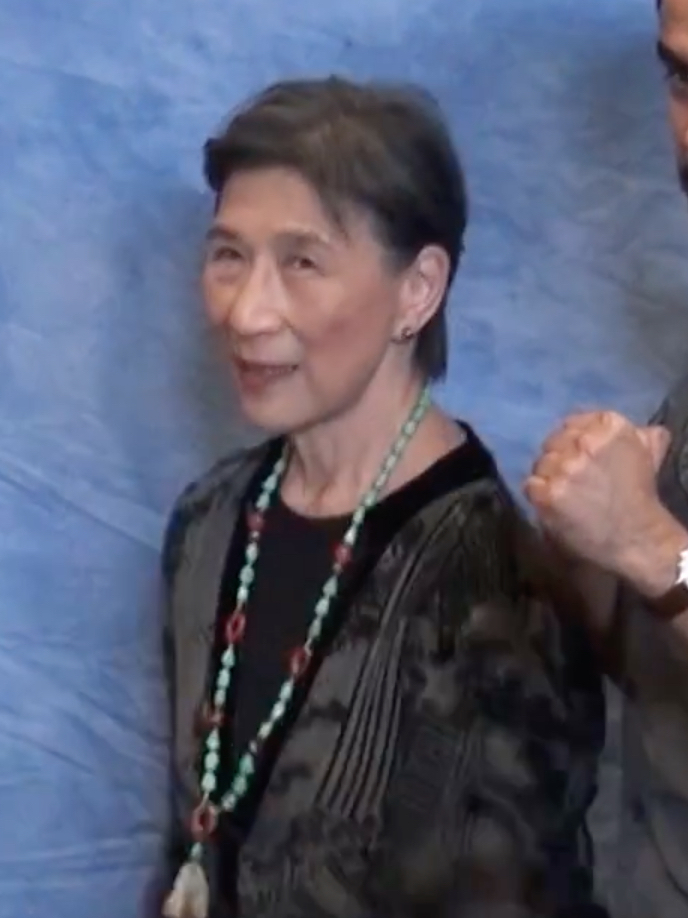
- Ho at the 2017 German Comic Con
- Born: 16 November 1943; Japanese-occupied Hong Kong
- Died: 10 July 2026 (aged 82)
- Occupation: Actress
- Years active: 1987–2026

Wai Ching Ho (Chinese: 何煒晴; 16 November 1943 – 10 July 2026) was a Hong Kong actress. Wai was best known for her role as Madame Gao in the Marvel Cinematic Universe, appearing in Daredevil (2015–2016), Iron Fist and The Defenders (both 2017). She voiced Grandma Wu in Disney/Pixar's Turning Red (2022) and had a recurring appearance in Awkwafina Is Nora from Queens.

On stage, she also starred in Celine Song's play Endlings.

== Death ==
Wai died at the age of 82 from a stroke on 10 July 2026. Her death was announced two days later.

== Selected filmography ==
=== Film ===
Year	Title	Role	Notes
1990	Cadillac Man	Asian wife	
1998	Happiness	Student #1	
2003	Robot Stories	Bernice; Lady Vendor	
2008	Adventures of Power	Yolanda Fong	
2010	The Sorcerer's Apprentice	Chinese woman	
2012	Premium Rush	Sister Chen	
2015	Tracers	Chen	
2017	April Flowers	Future April	
2018	Set It Up	Kirsten's mother	Uncredited
2019	Hustlers	Destiny's grandmother	
2022	Turning Red	Grandma Wu	Voice
2023	Lovely, Dark, and Deep	Zhang	
2023	Sight	Alian	her final performance

=== Television ===
Year	Title	Role	Notes
1987–1990	One Life to Live	Kim	2 episodes
1992	Swans Crossing	Dr. Kamber	2 episodes
2001	Law & Order	Mrs. Ngai	Episode: "Teenage Wasteland"
2001	Law & Order: Special Victims Unit	Susan Guan	Episode: "Inheritance"
2001	Law & Order: Criminal Intent	Jane Yu	Episode: "Enemy Within"
2006	Law & Order: Criminal Intent	Mrs. Wong	Episode: "Proud Flesh"
2009	Flight of the Conchords	Mrs. Lee	Episode: "The Tough Brets"
2015	Orange is the New Black	Mrs. Hu	Episode: "Ching Chong Chang"
2015–2016	Daredevil	Madame Gao	6 episodes
2016–2018	Fresh Off the Boat	Big Auntie	2 episodes
2017	Iron Fist	Madame Gao	9 episodes
2017	The Defenders	Madame Gao	6 episodes
2018	New Amsterdam	June Chiang	Episode: "Three Dots"
2019	Two Sentence Horror Stories	Ma	Episode: "Legacy"
2020–2023	Awkwafina Is Nora from Queens	Le-Wei	5 episodes
2023	Only Murders in the Building	Mei-Mei	Episode: "Thirty"
2023	Law & Order: Organized Crime	Sister Shu	Episode: "Blood Ties"
2025	Law & Order	Li Tan	Episode: "Sins of the Father"
