= Black Water Gold =

1970 American television movie

- Genre: Adventure; Drama
- Written by: Erwan Kahane
- Story by: Alan Landsburg
- Directed by: Alan Landsburg
- Starring: Keir Dullea; Bradford Dillman; France Nuyen; Aron Kincaid; Ricardo Montalbán
- Theme music composer: Mike Curb; Jerry Styner
- Country of origin: United States
- Original language: English

Production
- Producer: Alan Landsburg
- Cinematography: Andrew Laszlo
- Editor: John Soh
- Running time: 73 minutes
- Production company: Metromedia Productions

Original release
- Network: ABC
- Release: January 6, 1970

Black Water Gold is a 1970 American made-for-television adventure drama film starring Keir Dullea, Bradford Dillman, France Nuyen, Aron Kincaid, and Ricardo Montalbán. It was aired on January 6, 1970 in the ABC Movie of the Week space.

== Cast ==
- Keir Dullea as Christofer Perdeger
- Bradford Dillman as Lyle Fawcet
- France Nuyen as Thais
- Aron Kincaid as Ray Sandage
- Ricardo Montalbán as Alejandro Zayas (as Ricardo Montalban)
- Lana Wood as Eagan Ryan
- Jacques Aubuchon as Kefalos
- Paul Hampton as Roger
- Stuart Tyrone as Jason
