= Hello, Mrs. Money =

Chinese name
- Traditional Chinese: 李茶的姑妈
Transcriptions
- Directed by: Wu Yuhan
- Screenplay by: Qian Chenguang; Wu Jinrong
- Produced by: Beijing Happy Twist Entertainment Culture Media Co., Ltd.
- Starring: Huang Cailun; Allen; Song Yang; Celina Jade
- Release date: September 30, 2018 (China)
- Running time: 113 minutes
- Country: China
- Language: Mandarin

Hello, Mrs. Money (Chinese: 李茶的姑妈, lit. Li Cha’s Aunt) is a Chinese 2018 comedy film. Starring Huang Cailun, Allen, Song Yang, and Celina Jade, it was released in mainland China on September 30, 2018. It is part of a series of Chinese films exploring the theme of money.

== Plot ==
This play is adapted from the Happy Twist stage play "Li Cha's Aunt," which in turn is adapted from the British film "Charley's Aunt." However, the plot and the final romantic relationships of the main characters differ slightly. According to the original work, Huang Canghai's love interest should be Monica's adopted daughter, while Monica's love interest should be Liang Youde. In this play, however, Monica does not have an adopted daughter, and Huang Canghai's love interest is herself.

== Cast ==
Actor Name	Character Name	Introduction
Huang Cailun	Huang Canghai	Employee at Da Zha Group
Allen	Liang Jie Rui	Son-in-law of Wang Andy, son of Liang Youde, husband of Lily, General Manager of Da Zha Group
Song Yang	Li Cha	
Lu Jingshan	Monica	Li Cha's aunt
Han Yanbo	Wang Andy	Chairman of Da Zha Group
Chen Bing	Liang Youde	
Zhang Puran	Lily	Wang Andy's eldest daughter, wife of Liang Jie Rui
Wang Yu	Lulu	Wang Andy's youngest daughter, fiancée of Li Cha
Chang Yuan	Bartender	
Shen Teng	Pastor	

== Music ==
No.	Title	Lyrics	Music	Performer	Length
1.	"Appearance" (Theme Song)	Zheng Yixiao	Zheng Yixiao	Na Ying
2.	"The Sea" (Opening Song)	Zheng Yixiao	Zheng Yixiao, Luo Yiheng	Luo Yiheng
3.	"72 Degrees" (Ending Song)	Zheng Yixiao	Zheng Yixiao	Wu Mochou
4.	"Oh Auntie" (Insert Song)	Lin Caibing (original lyric translator), Zheng Yixiao, Hei Ma Marketing (adapted lyrics)	Indonesian Folk Song	Sha Baoliang
