= Keir Dullea =

American actor (born 1936)

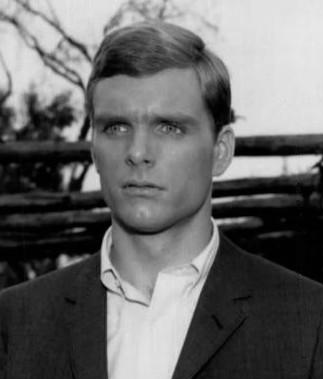
- Dullea in Kraft Mystery Theatre's "Cry Ruin" (1962)
- Born: Keir Atwood Dullea; May 30, 1936 (age 90); Cleveland, Ohio, U.S.
- Education: Rutgers University; San Francisco State University; Neighborhood Playhouse School of the Theatre
- Occupation: Actor
- Years active: 1960–present
- Spouses: Margot Bennett (m. 1960; div. 1968); Susan Lessons (m. 1969; div. 1970); Susie Fuller (m. 1972; died 1998); Mia Dillon (m. 1999)

Keir Atwood Dullea (/ˈkɪər dʊˈleɪ/ KEER doo-LAY; born May 30, 1936) is an American actor. He is known for his portrayal of astronaut David Bowman in the 1968 film 2001: A Space Odyssey and its 1984 sequel, 2010: The Year We Make Contact.

His other film roles include David and Lisa (1962), Bunny Lake Is Missing (1965) and Black Christmas (1974). Dullea studied acting at the Neighborhood Playhouse School of the Theatre in New York City. He has also performed on stage in New York City and in regional theaters; he has said that despite being more recognized for his film work, he prefers the stage.

== Early life ==
Keir Atwood Dullea was born on May 30, 1936, at the Mount Sinai Hospital in Cleveland, Ohio, the son of Margaret (née Ruttan) and Robert Dullea. His mother was of Scottish descent, and his father was a second-generation Irish American.

He was raised in the Greenwich Village section of New York City, where his parents ran a bookstore. He graduated from George School in Pennsylvania, attended Rutgers University and San Francisco State University, then pursued an acting career.

== Career ==
Dullea made his debut in a television adaptation of Mrs. Miniver (1960) with Maureen O'Hara, playing the German pilot. He was also in the television films Give Us Barabbas! (1961) and an adaptation of All Summer Long (1961). He was in demand for guest appearances on television shows such as Route 66, The New Breed, Checkmate and Cain's Hundred. Dullea made his film debut in 1961 in Hoodlum Priest, cast on the strength of his work on Route 66. His performance was well received. Metro-Goldwyn-Mayer and Disney offered long-term contracts (roles in Two Weeks in Another Town and Bon Voyage) but Dullea turned both down. He did accept a non-exclusive contract with Seven Arts and shot a pilot for a series that was not picked up. He appeared in Los Angeles on stage in The Short Happy Life.

In 1962, Dullea starred with Janet Margolin in David and Lisa, a film based on the book by Theodore Isaac Rubin, M.D., a psychiatrist who treated the two mentally ill adolescents portrayed in the film. It was a low-budget film that became a break-out hit, making over $2 million, and turning Dullea into an established name. Film Daily voted him "find of the year".

Dullea appeared on television in shows, including Empire, The United States Steel Hour, Bonanza, Naked City, Going My Way, The Eleventh Hour, Alcoa Premiere, Kraft Mystery Theater, Channing and 12 O'Clock High. He was second-billed in Mail Order Bride (1964), written and directed by Burt Kennedy. Dullea starred in the first screen adaptation of James Jones' The Thin Red Line (1964), then did a television adaptation of Pale Horse, Pale Rider and went to Italy to star in The Naked Hour (1964). In 1965, Dullea guest-starred as Lieutenant Kurt Muller in the episode titled "To Heinie, With Love" of Twelve O'Clock High. He took these roles to avoid being typecast as a troubled youth.

Dullea went to England to make Bunny Lake Is Missing (1965), which co-starred Dullea with Laurence Olivier, Carol Lynley and Noël Coward. Although they shared no scenes in the film, when Coward initially met Dullea on the set, he uttered the often quoted line "Keir Dullea, gone tomorrow." Nonetheless, he was voted one of 1965's "stars of tomorrow".

Dullea played the son of Lana Turner's character in Ross Hunter's remake of Madame X (1966), which underperformed commercially. He then appeared with Anne Heywood and Sandy Dennis in the Canadian box office hit, The Fox (1967). His first Broadway appearance was in 1967 in Ira Levin's Dr. Cook's Garden with Burl Ives, which only had a short run.

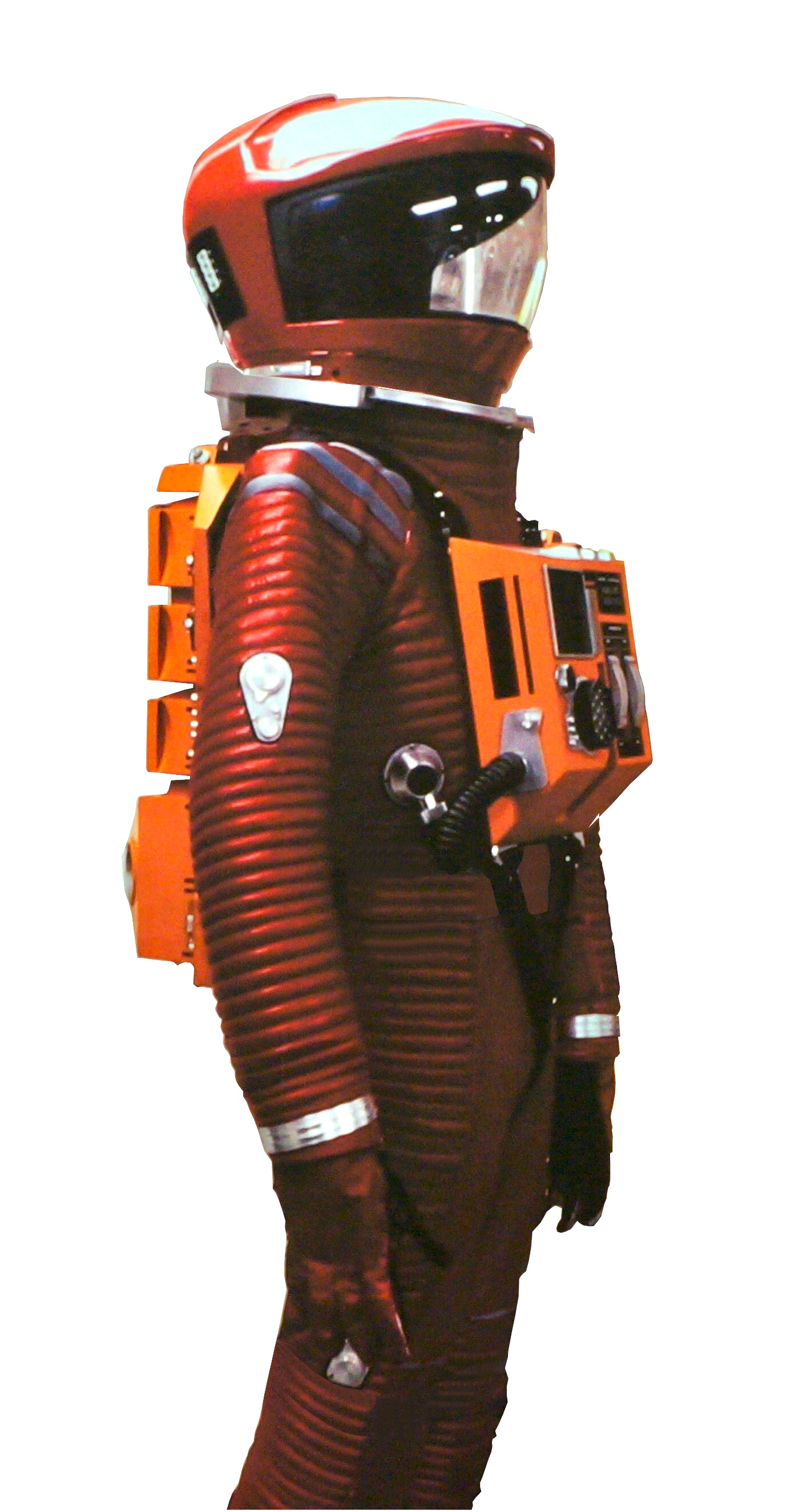
Spacesuit worn by Keir Dullea as David Bowman in 2001: A Space Odyssey

In 1968, Dullea appeared as astronaut David Bowman in Stanley Kubrick's film 2001: A Space Odyssey, which became a box-office success and is recognized by critics, filmmakers and audiences as one of the greatest and most influential films ever made. His line "Open the pod bay doors please, HAL" is #78 on the American Film Institute's list of 100 film quotes.

Dullea accepted the title role in the 1969 film De Sade, playing the title role (the Marquis de Sade). The film was a critical and commercial disappointment.

He had success on Broadway, starring in the 1969 hit comedy Butterflies Are Free with Eileen Heckart and Blythe Danner. In the play, he introduced the title song written by Stephen Schwartz (later recording the tune on an album for Platypus Records). The play was a huge hit, running for 1,128 performances, although Dullea did not appear in the film version. Dullea travelled to London to be in the production of Butterflies there and decided to stay.

He did a series of television films: Black Water Gold (1970), Montserrat (1971) and A Kiss Is Just a Kiss (1971). He did a thriller in Italy, Devil in the Brain (1972), and guest-starred on McMillan & Wife.

Dullea worked in Canada on the film Paperback Hero (1973) and worked in that country for a number of years. He had the lead role in a Canadian television series The Starlost (1973) but it only ran eighteen episodes.

He was a regular voice on CBS Radio Mystery Theater, which ran from 1974 to 1982. He was credited on five episodes. Dullea was in Paul and Michelle (1974) and had a major role in the Canadian production, 1974 cult classic Black Christmas as Peter Smythe, Jess Bradford's boyfriend.

Also in 1974, he played Brick in the Tennessee Williams's drama Cat on a Hot Tin Roof opposite Elizabeth Ashley and Fred Gwynne on Broadway which ran 160 performances. The production featured the now-definitive rewrite of the play.

He also starred in the 1975 play P.S. Your Cat Is Dead. Dullea was one of the last people to see actor Sal Mineo alive. The two were rehearsing for the play on the night of Mineo's murder.

He appeared in the Canadian film Welcome to Blood City (1977), The Haunting of Julia (1977), Three Dangerous Ladies (1977), the British Leopard in the Snow (1977), the Australian Because He's My Friend (1978), and some films for television: The Legend of the Golden Gun (1978), an adaptation of Brave New World (1980), The Hostage Tower (1980), No Place to Hide (1981) and BrainWaves (1982).

In 1981, Dullea moved to Westport, Connecticut.

In 1982, he starred in an off-Broadway production of A. E. Hotchner's Sweet Prince under the direction of his wife Susie Fuller. The following year, the couple co-founded the Theater Artists Workshop of Westport. Dullea appeared as a regular cast member in the Canadian soap opera Loving Friends and Perfect Couples, which ran in 1983.

He was in Blind Date (1984) and The Next One (1984). In 1984, he reprised his role as David Bowman in 2010: The Year We Make Contact, Peter Hyams' sequel to 2001. 2010 was nominated for five Academy Awards.

In July 1984, Dullea was guest artist aboard the ocean liner Queen Elizabeth 2. On July 11, he performed Anton Chekhov's one-act play The Harmfulness of Tobacco in the QE2 Theatre.

Dullea returned to Broadway when he joined the cast of the successful Doubles (1985–86). He toured with a theatre show Keir Dullea and Friends (1988).

In 1990, he said "My career has a lot to do with choices I made in my life. My focus over the last, oh, at least 10 years has been the theater. I really haven't made very much effort with films. I did more than 20 plays before I ever did The Hoodlum Priest, and (after that) I've done more than 20 films... It wasn't as if the industry had fired me; I had just made certain life decisions I suddenly was having to pay the piper for. So there was no film career at all. I'm always working (in theater). If I'm not engaged on stage in something, I'm working with my wife on another project. I no longer live my life waiting for my phone to ring to give me permission to work." He performed in The Servant on stage in 1990.

Dullea was in Oh, What a Night (1992) and played F. Scott Fitzgerald off-Broadway in The Other Side of Paradise (1992). In 2000, he appeared in The Audrey Hepburn Story as Hepburn's father Joseph. That year he was also in Songs in Ordinary Time (2000), and episodes of Witchblade, Ed, Law & Order: Special Victims Unit and Law and Order.

In summer 2002, he performed in the Washington Shakespeare Theatre's production of The Little Foxes. And the following year he could be seen in Alien Hunter (2003).

In December 2004, for its annual birthday celebration to "The Master", the Noël Coward Society invited Dullea as the guest celebrity to lay flowers in front of Coward's statue at New York's Gershwin Theatre, thereby commemorating the 105th birthday of Sir Noël. Around the same time, Sony Home Video released Bunny Lake Is Missing for the first time on DVD.

In 2006, he played Andrew Keener in Cost of Capital, which was the sixteenth episode of the sixteenth season of the original Law & Order American television series, and he had a role as a U.S. Senator and a "major influence and mentor" to Matt Damon's character, in Robert De Niro's film The Good Shepherd (2006). He was the narrator in an off-Broadway production of Mary Rose (2007). Dullea was in The Accidental Husband (2009), All Me, All the Time (2009), Castle, Fortune (2009) and Damages.

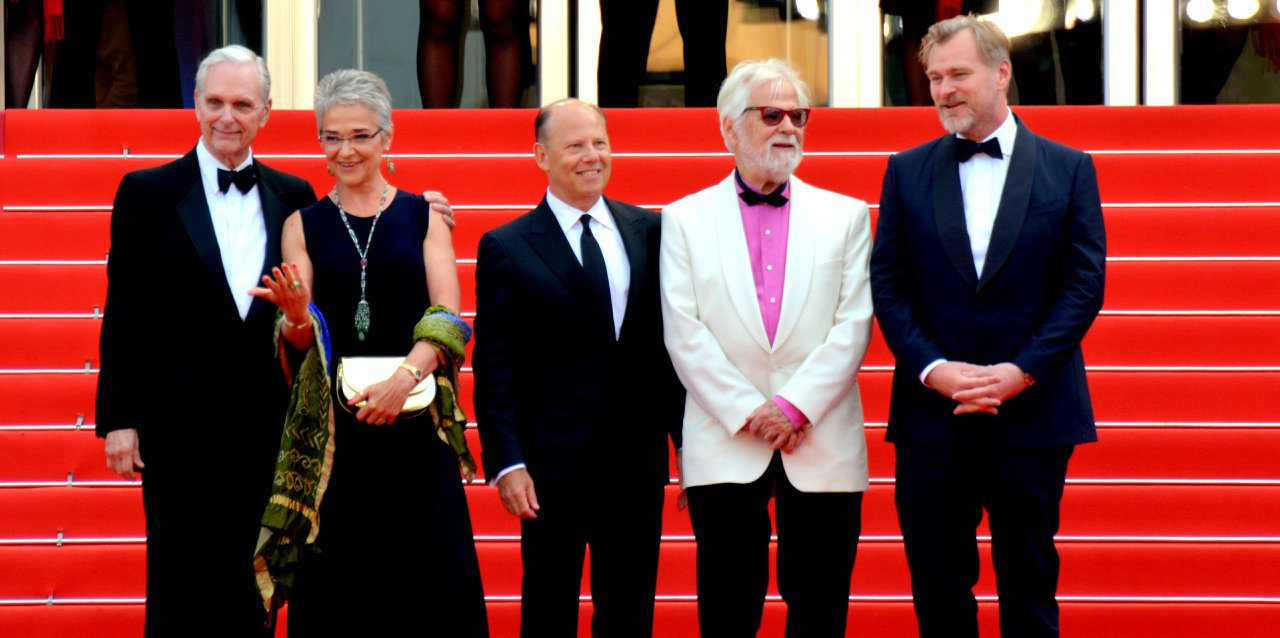
Keir Dullea with Katharina Kubrick, Ron Sanders, Jan Harlan and Christopher Nolan at the 2018 Cannes Film Festival

Keir Dullea at Mission 60s at the TWA Hotel - October 25th, 2026

In 2009, Dullea performed the role of Brooks in the stage production of The Shawshank Redemption in Dublin, Ireland. In April 2010, he performed the role of Tom Garrison in the off-Broadway production of the Robert Anderson play, I Never Sang for My Father co-starring Oscar-nominated actress Marsha Mason (as Margaret Garrison) and film and stage actor Matt Servitto (as Gene Garrison).

In October 2012, Dullea performed the role of Heinrich Mann in the Minneapolis's Guthrie Theater production of Tales from Hollywood by Christopher Hampton.

He was in Isn't It Delicious (2013) with his wife Mia Dillon, Infinitely Polar Bear (2014), Space Station 76 (2014) and April Flowers (2017).

During August and September 2013, Keir Dullea starred as Big Daddy in Cat on a Hot Tin Roof, playing opposite wife Mia Dillon in a joint production for the Wellfleet Harbor Actors Theater and the Provincetown Tennessee Williams Theater Festival.

Between July 10 and August 2, 2015, Dullea and Dillon were joined by Todd Cerveris, Cameron Clifford, Don Noble and Christa Scott-Reed in the Bucks County Playhouse production of Ernest Thompson's On Golden Pond.

He had a regular role in The Path (2014–16) and could be seen in Fahrenheit 451 (2018). Dullea was cast as Fleet Admiral Terrence Hood, a high-ranking UNSC officer, in the Paramount+ television series Halo which premiered on March 24, 2022.

== Personal life ==
Dullea has been married four times, first to stage and film actress Margot Bennett from 1960 until their divorce in 1968. He was married from 1969 to 1970 to Susan Lessons.

In 1972, Dullea married Susie Fuller, who had two daughters from a previous relationship. The couple met during the London run of Butterflies Are Free. Dullea, Fuller and her children lived in London for several years. She died in 1998 after 26 years of marriage.

In 1999, Dullea married actress Mia Dillon. They divide their time between an apartment in Manhattan and a house in Connecticut.

== Filmography ==
=== Films ===
Year	Title	Role	Notes
1960	Mrs. Miniver	German Pilot	television film
1961	Hoodlum Priest	Billy Lee Jackson	
1962	David and Lisa	David Clemens	
1964	The Naked Hours	Aldo	
1964	Mail Order Bride	Lee Carey	
1964	The Thin Red Line	Private Don Doll	
1965	Bunny Lake Is Missing	Stephen Lake	
1966	Madame X	Clayton Anderson Jr.	
1967	The Fox	Paul Grenfel	
1968	2001: A Space Odyssey	Dr. David Bowman	
1969	De Sade	Louis Alphonse Donatien, Marquis de Sade	
1970	Black Water Gold	Christofer Perdeger	television film
1971	Montserrat	Montserrat	television film
1972	Devil in the Brain	Oscar Minno	
1972	Pope Joan	Dr. Stevens	uncredited role
1973	Paperback Hero	Rick Dylan	
1974	Paul and Michelle	Garry	
1974	Black Christmas	Peter Smythe	
1976	Law and Order	Johnny Morrison	television film
1977	Three Dangerous Ladies	Dr. David Priestly	Segment: The Mannikin
1977	Welcome to Blood City	Lewis	
1977	Full Circle	Magnus Lofting	released as The Haunting of Julia
1978	Because He's My Friend	Eric	television film
1978	Leopard in the Snow	Dominic Lyall	
1979	The Legend of the Golden Gun	General George Armstrong Custer	television film
1980	Brave New World	Thomas Grambell	television film
1980	The Hostage Tower	Mr. Smith	television film
1981	No Place to Hide	Cliff Letterman	television film
1983	BrainWaves	Julian Bedford	
1984	Blind Date	Dr. Steiger	
1984	The Next One	Glenn / The Next One	AKA The Time Traveller
1984	2010: The Year We Make Contact	Dr. David Bowman	
1992	Oh, What a Night	Thorvald	direct-to-video
2000	The Audrey Hepburn Story	Joseph Hepburn-Ruston	television film
2000	La Divine Inspiration	William Shakespeare	short film
2000	Songs in Ordinary Time	Sam Fermoyle	television film
2002	Three Days of Rain	unknown	
2003	Alien Hunter	Secretary Bayer	
2006	The Day My Towers Fell	Harry Gold	short film
2006	A Lonely Sky	Older Man	short film
2006	The Good Shepherd	Senator John Russell Sr.	
2008	The Accidental Husband	Karl Bollenbecker	
2009	Fortune	Jonah Pryce	
2009	All Me, All the Time	Jake	
2012	HENRi	Henri (voice)	short film
2013	Isn't It Delicious	Bill Weldon	
2014	Infinitely Polar Bear	Murray Stuart	
2014	Space Station 76	Mr. Marlowe	
2017	April Flowers	Mr. X	
2018	Fahrenheit 451	The Historian	television film
2019	Valley of the Gods	Ulim	
2022	Sonder	Eli	short film
2026	Beer and Hot Chocolate	Dave	*Upcoming short film

=== Television ===
Year	Title	Role	Notes
1960	Westinghouse Desilu Playhouse	Tim Dryden	episode: "Cry Ruin"
1961	Route 66	Paul	episode: "Black November"
1961	Hallmark Hall of Fame	Elisha	episode: "Give Us Barabbas!"
1961	Play of the Week	Don	episode: "All Summer Long"
1961	The New Breed	Frank	episode: "Prime Target"
1961–1963	The United States Steel Hour	Don McCabe	4 episodes
1961–1963	Alcoa Premiere	Maples / Lincoln "Linc" Ketterman / Tommy Miller / Eric Green	4 episodes
1961–1963	Naked City	Joey Ross / Les Gerard	2 episodes
1962	Checkmate	Eddie Phillips	episode: "A Very Rough Sketch"
1962	Cain's Hundred	Alec Benden	episode: "A Creature Lurks in Ambush"
1962	Kraft Mystery Theater	Tim Dryden	episode: "Cry Ruin"
1962	The DuPont Show of the Week	Lieutenant	episode: "The Outpost"
1962	The Eleventh Hour	Jerry Bullock	episode: "Cry a Little for Mary Too"
1963	Empire	Skip Wade	episode: "Stopover on the Way to the Moon"
1963	Bonanza	Bob Jolley	episode: "Elegy for a Hangman"
1963	Going My Way	Dennis Brady	episode: "One Small Unhappy Family"
1964	Channing	Larry Franklin	episode: "The Trouble with Girls"
1964	The Wednesday Play	Adam	episode: "Pale Horse, Pale Rider"
1965	Twelve O'Clock High	Lieutenant Muller	episode: "To Heinie, With Love"
1972	McMillan & Wife	"Buzz" Simms	episode: "Blues for Sally M"
1973–74	The Starlost	Devon	16 episodes
1975	Switch	Anthony Kirk	episode: "The James Caan Con"
1975–1982	Radio Mystery Theater	multiple characters (voice)	5 episodes, many uncredited episodes; radio plays
1983	Loving Friends and Perfect Couples	unknown	
1986	Guiding Light	Dr. Mark Jarrett	
1989	Murder, She Wrote	Jason Reynard	episode: "Test of Wills"
2001	Witchblade	Dr. Immo	episode: "Convergence"
2001–2006	Law & Order	Paul Lyman / Andrew Keener	2 episodes
2002	Ed	Robert Stanley	episode: "Nice Guys Finish Last"
2002	Law & Order: Special Victims Unit	Judge Walt Thornburg	episode: "Justice"
2009	Castle	Jonathan Tisdale	episode: "Flowers for Your Grave"
2011	Damages	Julius	episode: "I'm Worried About My Dog"
2016	The Path	Dr. Stephen Meyer	
2020	Hunters	Klaus Rhinehart	episode: "Eilu v' Eilu"
2022	Halo	Fleet Admiral Hood	episode: "Unbound"

=== Stage ===
Year	Title	Role	Notes
1967	Dr. Cook's Garden	Dr. Jim Tennyson	Belasco Theatre, Broadway
1969	Butterflies are Free	Don Baker	[Booth Theatre]], Broadway
1970	Butterflies are Free	Don Baker	Apollo Theatre
1974	Cat on a Hot Tin Roof	Brick	Anta Theatre, Broadway
1975	P. S. Your Cat Is Dead!	Jimmy	John Golden Theatre, Broadway
1976	Bus Stop	Bo Decker	Phoenix Theatre
1982	Sweet Prince	Judd Leland	Theater Off Park, Off-Broadway
1983	Outward Bound	Tom Prior	Ogunquit Playhouse
1985	Doubles	Guy (Replacement)	Ritz Theatre, Broadway
1987	Morocco	Mr. Kempler	Hartford Stage
1988	Keir Dullea and Friends	Himself	National Tour
1990	The Servant	Hugo Barrett	Tarragon Theatre
1993	The Sound of Music	Captain Georg von Trapp	National Tour
1996	The Seagull	Boris Alexeyevitch Trigorin	PlayMakers Repertory Company
1998	Double Act	George	American Stage Festival, New Hampshire
1999	The Cherry Orchard	Yermolai Alekaseyevich Lopakhin	Bristol Riverside Theatre
1999	Deathtrap	Sidney Bruhl	Ogunquit Playhouse
2002	The Little Foxes	Horace Giddens	Shakespeare Theatre Company
2007	Mary Rose	Narrator	Vineyard Theatre
2009	The Shawshank Redemption	Brooks	Gaiety Theatre
2010	I Never Sang For my Father	Tom Garrison	Clurman Theatre, Off-Broadway
2010	A Delicate Balance	Harry	Berkshire Theatre Festival
2012	Tales from Hollywood	Heinrich Mann	Guthrie Theater
2013	Cat on a Hot Tin Roof	Big Daddy	Wellfleet Harbor Actors Theater
2015	On Golden Pond	Norman Thayer, Jr.	Bucks County Playhouse

=== Video games ===
List of video game appearances, with year, title, and role shown
Year	Title	Role	Notes
2023	Starfield	Keeper Aquilus (voice)	Video game

== Awards and nominations ==
BAFTA Awards

- 1964: Nominated, "Most Promising Newcomer to Leading Film Roles" – David and Lisa

Golden Globe Awards

- 1962: Won, "Most Promising Male Newcomer"

Laurel Awards

- 1963: Nominated, "Top New Male Personality"

San Francisco International Film Festival

- 1962: Won, "Best Actor" – David and Lisa
