= Isn't It Delicious =

- Film poster
- Directed by: Michael Patrick Kelly
- Written by: Michael Patrick Kelly; Kathleen Kiley
- Produced by: Michael Patrick Kelly
- Starring: Kathleen Chalfant; Keir Dullea
- Cinematography: Axel Fischer
- Edited by: Michael Patrick Kelly; David Charles Pisani
- Music by: David Amram
- Production companies: Empekay Kayjaykay Productions; Skyline-NYC Productions
- Distributed by: Virgil Films & Entertainment
- Release date: May 11, 2013 (Rainier Independent Film Festival)
- Running time: 104 minutes
- Country: United States
- Language: English

Isn't It Delicious is a 2013 American comedy-drama film starring Kathleen Chalfant and Keir Dullea.

== Plot ==
When Joan Weldon discovers she is dying of lung cancer, she sets out to reconcile her dysfunctional relationships with her three children, her husband, and along the way, her former best friend. The family's destructive ways are offset by messy and somewhat humorous attempts by Joan to set her children on the right course before she dies. In this big dysfunctional mix, they will all learn to connect in their own ways, and realize on their own terms what life is about.

== Cast ==
- Kathleen Chalfant as Joan Weldon
- Keir Dullea as Bill Weldon
- Alice Ripley as Caroline Weldon
- Mia Dillon as Molly
- Malachy McCourt as Father Bob
- Robert LuPone as Sam Spenser
- Nick Stevenson as Bobby Weldon
- Jonah Young as Teddy Weldon
- Alexandra Mingione as Robin

== Reception ==
The film has a 40% rating on Rotten Tomatoes.
