= De Sade (film) =

1969 film

- Theatrical release poster
- Directed by: Cy Endfield
- Written by: Richard Matheson
- Based on: Life of Marquis de Sade
- Produced by: Samuel Z. Arkoff; James H. Nicholson
- Starring: Keir Dullea; Senta Berger; Lilli Palmer; Anna Massey; Sonja Ziemann; John Huston
- Cinematography: Richard Angst
- Edited by: Max Benedict; Hermann Haller
- Music by: Billy Strange
- Production companies: American International Pictures; CCC Film; Trans-Continental Filmproduktion
- Distributed by: American International Pictures (United States); Columbia Film-Verleih (West Germany)
- Release dates: September 25, 1969 (New York); August 1970 (West Germany)
- Running time: 113 minutes
- Countries: United States; West Germany
- Language: English
- Budget: $6 million or £2 million
- Box office: $1.25 million

De Sade (German: Das Ausschweifende Leben des Marquis De Sade) is a 1969 American-German drama film directed by Cy Endfield and starring Keir Dullea, Senta Berger and Lilli Palmer. It is based on the life of Donatien Alphonse François, Marquis de Sade, named Louis Alphonse Donatien in the film.

Dullea, in his first film role since the 1968 release of 2001: A Space Odyssey, plays the title character in a film characterized by its psychedelic imagery and go-go sensibilities. As the dying Marquis recalls his life out of sequence, he is terrorized by his uncle the Abbé and haunted by his own past of debauchery.

== Plot ==
The middle-aged Marquis de Sade Louis Alphonse Donatien arrives at his ancestral estate of La Coste, having escaped incarceration. In the theater at the castle, he meets his uncle, the Abbé, who persuades him to stay to watch an entertainment that has been prepared for him. The play is a parody of the Marquis' parents Jean-Baptiste and Marie-Éléonore haggling with Monsieur and Madame Montreuil over the prospective marriage of their children, leading to a flashback in time to the actual negotiations.

The young Louis flees the proposed marriage to Mademoiselle Renée de Montreuil, but returns and marries her under threat of imprisonment. Louis would prefer Renée's younger sister Anne, finding Renée to be very frightened and cold to his charms. At an orgy with several young prostitutes, Louis begins to get very rough in his play and explains some of his philosophy to the women, leading to the first in a long series of imprisonments.

Released into the custody of his mother-in-law Madame de Montreuil, Louis finds himself a prisoner in his own home. When Anne is sent away to a convent school, Louis begins liaisons first with his mother-in-law's protégé, Mademoiselle Collette, and then with an actress, La Beauvoisin, for whom he builds a theater at La Coste. The first play performed is for the benefit of the Abbé, who is chagrined to see that the performance is about his own misuse of the young boy Louis. In a flashback, the actual event is played out, the Marquis's later deeds and philosophy thus being given a cold-Freudian origin.

Louis proceeds through a series of flashbacks involving his father's death, a mysterious and recurring old man, and the baptism day of one of Louis' own children, culminating in the scandal of Rose Keller, a widow whom he ties up and flagellates with a sword. Madame de Montreuil is forced to pay Rose for her silence, and to send Louis back into exile at La Coste.

Louis continues to pursue Anne, and after an elaborate orgy where he is whipped into unconsciousness, he flees to Italy with the young woman. Returned to prison, Louis is tormented with visions of Madame de Montreuil disowning Anne and his uncle the Abbé seducing her. Madame de Montreuil visits him in prison, and tearfully tells him he has ruined her family and that he will remain imprisoned forever.

Back on the stage, a mock trial is held where the Marquis is accused of murdering Anne. The mysterious old man is present at the proceedings, and Anne herself appears to accuse Louis of her murder. Louis ruefully remembers Anne's death in Italy from the plague. An older Louis talks with Renée about their misfortunes and regrets, telling her he can find no meaning in life.

At another drunken and destructive debauchery, Louis begins to see visions of Renée in the midst of his revel. The old man lies on his death bed in prison, crying out for Renee's forgiveness. It is revealed that the old man is the Marquis himself, following the young Marquis through his memories as he seeks his one moment of reality. Deciding to look one last time, the old man closes his eyes as the scene cuts back the middle-aged Marquis arriving at La Coste.

== Cast ==
- Keir Dullea as Louis Alphonse Donatien de Sade
  - Max Kiebach (uncredited) as Young Louis de Sade
- Senta Berger as Anne de Montreuil
- John Huston as Abbé de Sade
- Lilli Palmer as Madame de Montreuil
- Anna Massey as Renée de Montreuil
- Sonja Ziemann as La Beauvoisin
- Christiane Krüger as Laura
- Uta Levka as Rose Keller
- Barbara Stanek as Colette
- Susanne von Almassy as Marie-Éléonore de Sade
- Friedrich Schoenfelder as Jean-Baptiste de Sade
- Herbert Weissbach as Monsieur de Montreuil
- Maria Caleita (uncredited) as Marie
- Barboura Morris (uncredited) as Nun

== Production ==
AIP announced they would make the film in 1967 to be based on Theatre of Horrors, an unpublished novel by Louis M. Heyward.

Roger Corman worked on the first draft of the script with Richard Matheson but was dissatisfied and told James H. Nicholson of AIP he was going off the project. "I thought the picture was a trap," said Corman. "If we tried to show what de Sade did, or as Dick Matheson and I did, some of his fantasies, or more specifically what de Sade did in his fantasies, we'd be arrested. And if we didn’t show it, the audience was going to be cheated. They were going to be cheated because of the title and because of the way I knew American International would sell the picture. So I stepped away and Jim got a first draft from me for nothing. Matheson went on to do a second draft.” Matheson said in 1974 that the screenplay was "one of the best scripts I have ever written. It was written as a fantasy... My idea was that this was all a reverie taking place in the mind of the dying de Sade."

Among the original directors discussed for the film were Michael Reeves and Gordon Hessler. The film was also to have been produced by Hessler. Hessler later said "I never really worked on that film. The director was to have been Michael Reeves, but he was ill and I could not get along with Cy Endfield who replaced him. Deke Heyward suggested I do Murders in the Rue Morgue instead." Cy Endfield became director.

According to Matheson, "For some reason when Cy Endfield directed it he decided not to do it as a fantasy, and yet keep incidents in the script as they were, which made it absolutely incomprehensible." During production it was announced that AIP would make De Sade and also Justine from the novel by De Sade. The film's budget was announced at $6 million.

=== Shooting ===
The film was shot at Spandau Studios in Berlin and Bavaria Studios in Munich. The film's sets were designed by the art director Hans Jürgen Kiebach. Matheson said Endfield "who was apparently having some mental problems at the time, would X out pages of the script which would indicate to the studio that the pages had been shot, and they had not been shot. I was told that when everything was finished they had three-quarters of a film to work with. They had to cut that together to make some sort of continuity, and they sent Roger Corman over there to shoot some fast orgy sequences to fill in the breach. It all collapsed entirely."

Roger Corman was called in to help finish the movie. Corman said:

Cy had become ill. He had some sort of nervous problem that prevented him from finishing the picture. And they only had a few days of pick-up shooting left. Every major scene in the film was shot. They needed somebody to go to Berlin for just a few days to finish it and I was the only person who knew the script. Jim wanted to know if I could leave on Friday and, with no credit, finish the film... I met with Cy Endfield and he was very friendly. I explained to him that I was not there to do anything but carry out what he wanted. So he told me roughly what he had planned for the last few days and I went out and did the shots. It was a pleasant, easy time.

Keir Dullea later said he "loved" working with Endfield but Corman having to take over meant "there was no real style to the movie. Endfield never got to finish his own director's cut. I did not think it was a very good film." Corman later claimed that AIP did not pay him what he felt he was owed for his work on the film, contributing to him leaving the company. Matheson said "James Nicholson told me over lunch, years later, that John Huston, who appeared in the film as The Abbe, said he would have been glad to direct it at the time."

=== Connections to real life ===
In real life, Sade was meant to be baptized with the name Donatien-Aldonse-Louis; neither of his parents Jean-Baptiste and Marie-Éléonore were present at the ceremony, and the name Donatien-Alphonse-Francois was given to him in error. In his life, he used a number of pseudonyms and variations on his true name. During the French Revolution, he called himself simply "Louis Sade."

== Reception ==
=== Critical ===
Vincent Canby of The New York Times wrote that the film "is not quite as silly as it looks and sounds, but it comes very close. It successfully reduces one of the most fascinating figures of world literature to the role of not-so-straight man in a series of naughty tableaux vivants."

Variety said it was "a film to bridge the generation gap. It will attract both the turned-on hip and the dirty old men." It called it "a dramatically compelling, creative and artful film" but warned, "True sado-masochists will be disappointed" because "the orgy scenes are silly, not obscene or erotic. And there is nothing shown or even suggested that is terrible enough to jail a man for life."

Gene Siskel of the Chicago Tribune gave the film half of one star out of four and wrote, "Titillation is the name of this celluloid garbage, but even members of the bit and bridle set will be turned off by Keir Dullea ripping open pillows and pouring wine over harlots." Charles Champlin of the Los Angeles Times reported that the film was "not all that great as a skin-flick" and called John Huston's performance "curiously energyless" and Dullea "incredibly phlegmatic." Gary Arnold of The Washington Post described the film as "rather dull" and "a dreary theatrical pageant," with Dullea giving a "ludicrous" performance that "resembles nothing so much as Johnny Carson doing a take-off on de Sade." Richard Combs of The Monthly Film Bulletin wrote that De Sade "both confirms and confounds expectations. An intellectually ambitious script by Richard Matheson mingles with some hideously tinted slow motion orgies; John Huston's magnificently decayed Abbé and Keir Dullea's own variety of mental torment play well against each other but in the end fail to clarify very much about de Sade and his obsessions."

Matheson declared in 1974, "De Sade was a marvelous script. I would stand on it today. If someone would shoot it the way I wrote it, it would be a very successful film. They chose to emphasize the shoddy elements. There were no shoddy elements in my script. I used stream of consciousness in a very abstract way to indicate the sexual aspects. But, of course, I should have known it wasn't going to turn out that way."

De Sade currently holds an 11% approval rating on Rotten Tomatoes based on 9 reviews, with an average rating of 3.9/10.

=== Box office ===
Samuel Z. Arkoff of AIP said in 1974 that the film was his company's biggest flop to date. It grossed $1,250,000, more than other AIP films, but lost more money because of the large advertising bill.

== Soundtrack ==
A record album of the soundtrack music by Billy Strange was released in 1969 by Capitol Records (ST-5170). It has never been released on CD.

== Paperback novelization ==
A novelization of Richard Matheson's screenplay was written by Edward Fenton under the pseudonym he almost always employed for media tie-in work, Henry Clement. It was released by Signet Books in September 1969. Ironically, under his own by-line, Fenton was best known as an author of books for children.

== See also ==
- List of American films of 1969
