= Green Dolphin Beat =

1994 American television film

- Genre: Action; Drama
- Written by: Robert Ward
- Directed by: Tommy Lee Wallace
- Starring: John Wesley Shipp; Jeffrey D. Sams; Troy Evans
- Music by: Peter Manning Robinson
- Country of origin: United States
- Original language: English

Production
- Executive producers: Aaron Spelling; E. Duke Vincent; Robert Ward
- Producer: Christopher Morgan
- Production location: Vancouver
- Cinematography: Tobias A. Schliessler
- Editor: Charles Bornstein
- Running time: 96 minutes
- Production companies: Robert Ward Productions; Spelling Entertainment

Original release
- Network: Fox
- Release: June 27, 1994

Green Dolphin Beat is a 1994 American TV movie directed by Tommy Lee Wallace. It was shot in Vancouver.

== Cast ==
- John Wesley Shipp as Terry Lattner
- Jeffrey D. Sams as John King
- Linda Hoffman as Ty Martin
- Miguel Sandoval as Captain Juan Garcia
- Troy Evans as Joe Keller
- John Lavachielli as Ron Marchek
- Linden Ashby as Dave Henderson
- Melanie Smith as Linda Rodriguez
- Kimberly Scott as Carter
- Cali Timmins as Bennett
- Robin Mattson as Rose

== Reception ==
A negative review by Tony Scott of Variety reads, "Directed without distinction by Tommy Lee Wallace, “Green Dolphin Beat” tries familiar humor — a flock of prosties hauled into the precinct, cutesy patter between King and Lattner — and supposedly startling revelations, such as a therapist involved in lesbianism, or King unconcerned about the colors of the dames he dates. Sams' King, stuck with the only verbal crudity in the script, comes off as authoritative and persuasive. Shipp as his partner is OK, and Lavachielli gives the telefilm much-needed energy. Others, except Sandoval, Elizabeth Leslie as Keller’s wife’s floating ghost, and the convincing Mattson, don’t register very high."
