= Heaven's Fire =

- Written by: Rob Kerchner; Charles Philip Moore
- Directed by: David Warry-Smith
- Starring: Eric Roberts; Jürgen Prochnow
- Country of origin: United States
- Original language: English

Production
- Running time: 80 minutes
- Production company: Saban Entertainment

Original release
- Network: Fox Family Channel
- Release: August 7, 1999

Heaven's Fire is a 1999 action television film starring Eric Roberts and Jürgen Prochnow, that aired on Fox Family Channel.

== Plot ==
The story involves a group of would-be burglars who attempt a daring daylight robbery of a Federal Building in Seattle, Washington. However, the criminals are forced to improvise when their getaway helicopter crashes and sets a deadly fire in the building. Also in the building is a former security guard (Eric Roberts) who is the only person who can stop the heist and save the innocent bystanders who are trapped in the burning building.

== Reception ==
TV Guide said, "If you enjoy hogwash about trapped victims in tall buildings, then this will satisfy your sub-DIE HARD cravings." Radio Times rated it 2 stars saying, "Two plots for the price of one, and neither is much good."

== See also ==
- List of firefighting films
