= Mrs. Miniver (1960 film) =

- Based on: Mrs. Miniver by Jan Struther
- Screenplay by: George Baxt; George Froeschel; James Hilton; Arthur Wimperis
- Directed by: Marc Daniels
- Starring: Maureen O'Hara; Leo Genn; Cathleen Nesbitt
- Country of origin: United States
- Original language: English

Production
- Producer: David Susskind
- Running time: 90 minutes
- Production company: CBS

Original release
- Network: CBS
- Release: January 7, 1960

Mrs Miniver is a 1960 TV adaptation of the novel Mrs. Miniver.

== Cast ==
- Maureen O'Hara as Mrs. Miniver
- Leo Genn as Clem Miniver
- Juliet Mills as Carol Beldon
- Cathleen Nesbitt as Lady Beldon
- Keir Dullea as German Pilot
- Peter Lazer as Toby Miniver
- Joan Terrace as Judy Miniver

== Production ==
The show rehearsed for three weeks.
