= April Flowers (film) =

- Directed by: Christopher Tedrick
- Starring: Celina Jade; Keir Dullea; Wai Ching Ho
- Cinematography: Eugene Koh
- Edited by: Henry Steady
- Release date: 2017
- Running time: 85 minutes
- Country: United States
- Language: English

April Flowers is a 2017 American romantic comedy film written and directed by Christopher Tedrick and starring Celina Jade, Keir Dullea, and Wai Ching Ho.
