= Celina Jade =

Hong Kong and American actor

- 盧靖姍
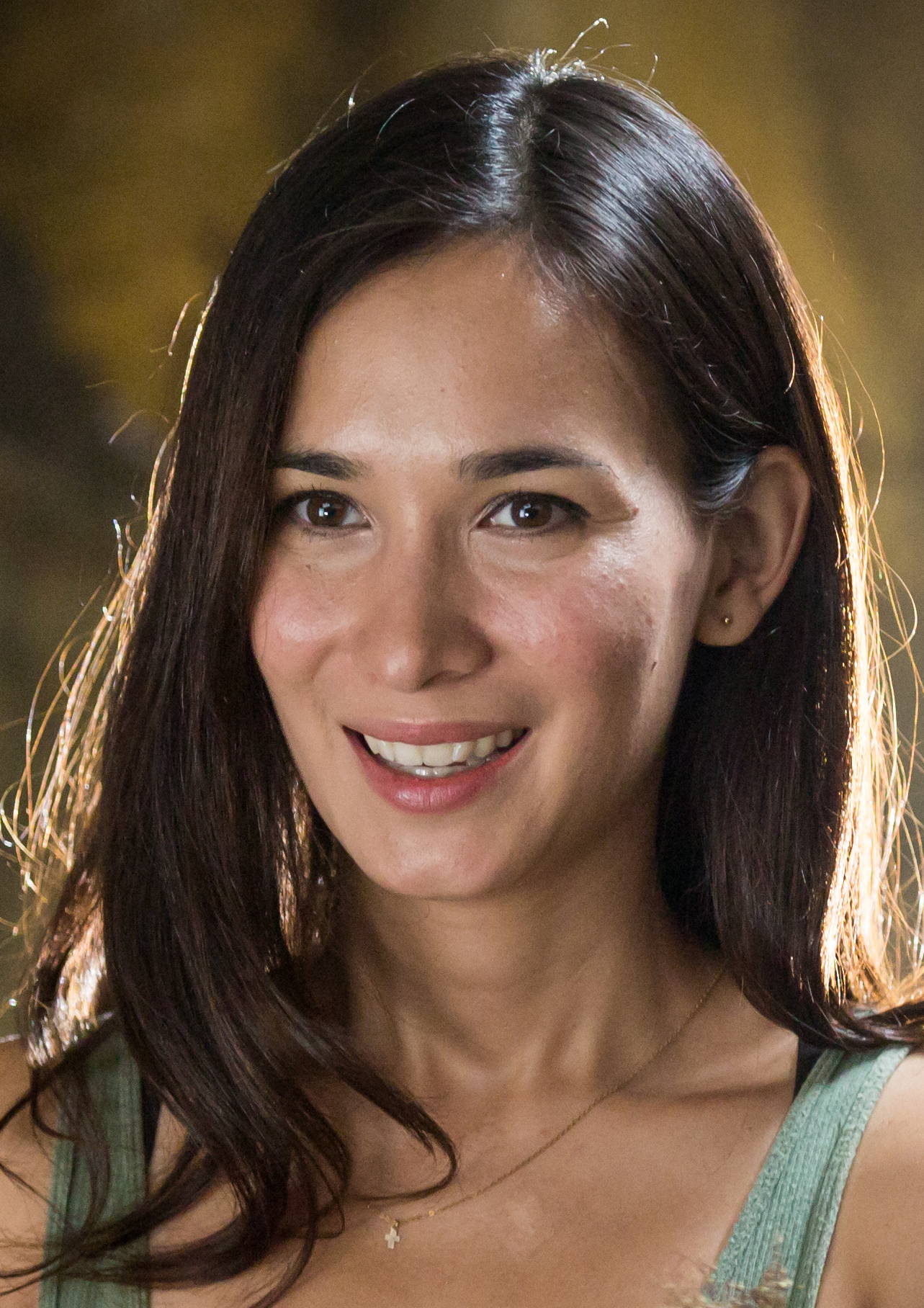
- Jade in Wolf Warrior 2
- Born: Celina Horan; 10 June 1985 (age 41); British Hong Kong
- Education: London School of Economics
- Occupations: Actress; singer-songwriter; model; martial artist
- Years active: 2008–present
- Spouse: Han Geng (m. 2019)
- Children: 2
- Father: Roy Horan

Chinese name
- Traditional Chinese: 盧靖姍
- Simplified Chinese: 卢靖姗
Transcriptions
Standard Mandarin
- Hanyu Pinyin: Lú Jìngshān
Yue: Cantonese
- Jyutping: Lou^{4} Zing^{6} Saan^{1}

Previous Chinese name
- Traditional Chinese: 盧雪蓮
- Simplified Chinese: 卢雪莲
Transcriptions
Standard Mandarin
- Hanyu Pinyin: Lú Xuělián
Yue: Cantonese
- Jyutping: Lou^{4} Syut^{3} Lin^{4}

Celina Jade (born Celina Horan; 10 June 1985) is a Hong Kong and American actress, singer, songwriter, model, and martial artist. Internationally she is best known for her role as Shado (and Mei) in the 2010s CW series Arrow. In China she is best known for starring in the 2017 blockbuster Wolf Warrior 2, the third highest-grossing Chinese film ever made.

== Early life and education ==
Celina Jade was born in Hong Kong to American kung fu star Roy Horan and Chinese mother Christina Hui. She was educated at a local Chinese school from kindergarten through high school, and is fluent in Cantonese, Mandarin and English.

She learned archery, shooting and Taekwondo from her father growing up. At 14, she left Hong Kong for New Jersey, but returned to Hong Kong shortly after, and attended Island School. She later attended the London School of Economics. She graduated top of her class with First Class Honours in BSc Management.

== Career ==
=== Acting ===
Jade's acting career started in Hong Kong & China in 2007. She was cast as the leading lady in her first film, Legendary Assassin alongside Wu Jing. She also starred in Chinese Films Love Connected, and All's Well Ends Well; appearing on TV shows like Dolce Vita, Jade Solid Gold; with regular appearances across TV channels in China including TVB, CCTV and Hunan TV.

In 2012, she landed her first role in a US film by Universal Pictures, The Man with the Iron Fists, as directed by the RZA starring Russell Crowe & Lucy Liu. During the same year, she lent her voice as the character, Not Ping, in the Square Enix game Sleeping Dogs. She also began filming her first web series, Wish Upon a Star, as lead actress alongside Asian actor Peter Ho. Later in 2012, Jade was cast to play the recurring role of Shado (Oliver Queen's martial arts teacher & girlfriend) in The CW series Arrow, a TV Show based on the DC Comics Green Arrow. She appeared in eighteen episodes over the first two seasons, before reappearing as Shado's twin sister Mei for two episodes of season three and 1 episode in season 4.

In 2015, Jade starred opposite Asian action star Tony Jaa, Dolph Lundgren and Ron Perlman in “Skin Trade” as the leading lady. Shortly after, she was cast to play the character April in Indie film "April Flowers". In 2016, Jade rejoins Wu Jing to play the lead actress in the sequel of Chinese Franchise Wolf Warrior alongside China's Zhang Han & Frank Grillo. The film was the sixth highest-grossing film of 2017 at US$874 million, making it the 54th highest-grossing film worldwide. It is the first and only non-Hollywood film ever to be included in the list of 100 all-time highest-grossing films worldwide. It was selected as the Chinese entry for the Best Foreign Language Film at the 90th Academy Awards.

=== Music ===
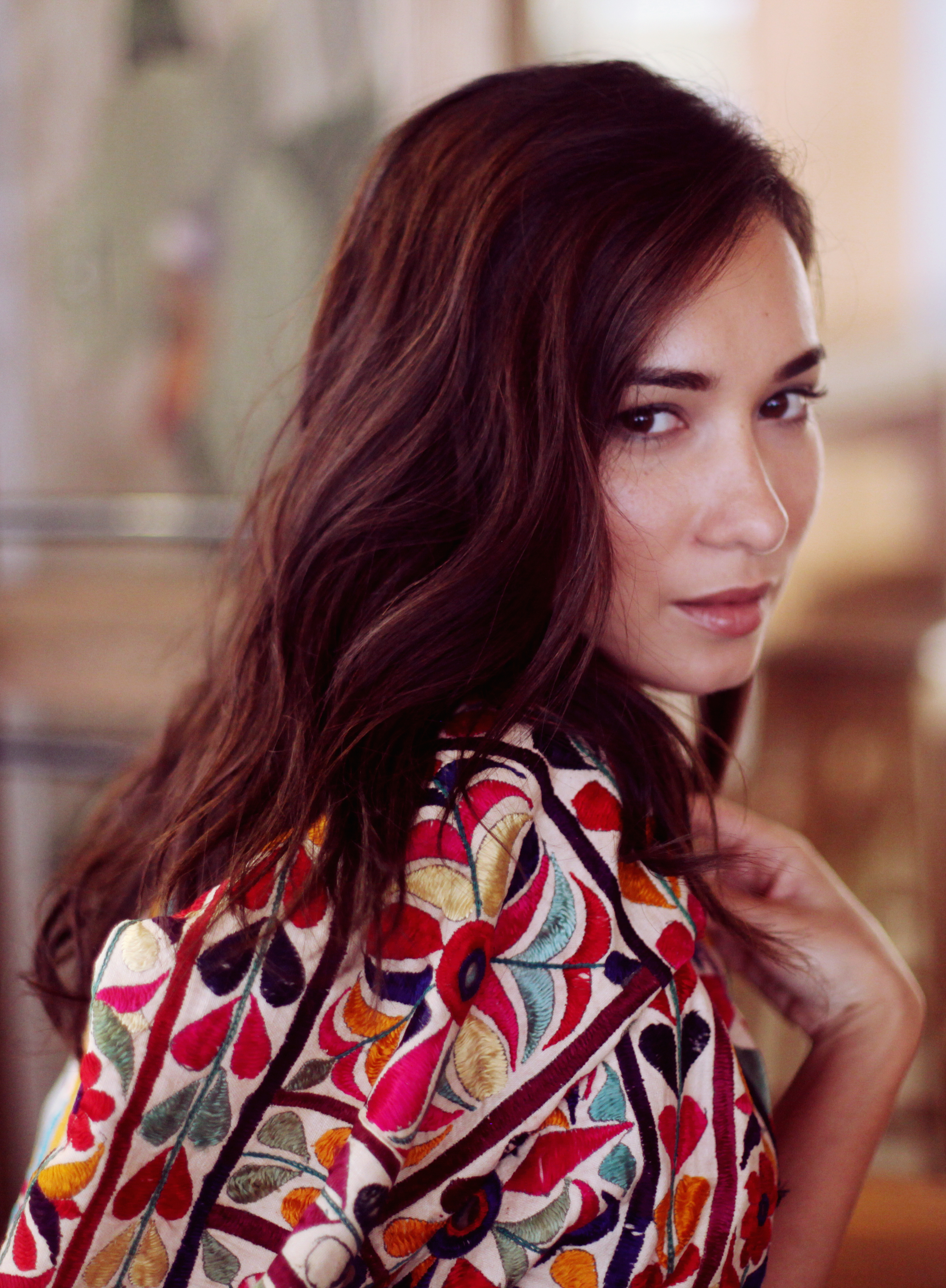
Jade in 2016

At age 14, Jade won an Asia-wide singing competition, which led to a record deal with Japanese producer, Tetsuya Komuro. Together, they released two EPs, Good News Bad News and 'Kwong Ying Zi Gan'. In July 2000, she performed alongside Namie Amuro in front of President Bill Clinton & other world leaders at the G8 Summit in Okinawa, Japan. At age 15, she had her first number-one hit with the song, "Kwong Ying Zi Gan" in Taiwan. She has since then been featured in multiple ad campaigns for Marks & Spencers, Cathay Pacific, Motorola and Ponds globally.

Jade signed with music mogul Paco Wong under Gold Typhoon (EMI) in 2007. She also sang the theme song for Legendary Assassin, "Ceng Jing Xin Teng", which was performed live on TV and radio stations across China. In 2009, she left GoldTyphoon (EMI) and signed with Terry McBride, CEO of Nettwerk Music Group (the force behind Avril Lavigne, Sarah McLachlan, Dido).

In 2011, Jade wrote & sang the Mandarin single "Xun Zhao (The Find)" for the web series Wish Upon A Star & sang the theme song "Shi Zhong" with The Wheels. In late 2012, Jade independently released her first self-written album across the internet, Celina. In 2013, Jade was cast as the leading lady in the musical Good Morning Hong Kong which played at the Lyric Theatre in the Academy of Performing Arts. In 2014, Jade recorded a duet "迷彩 Fighting For" which hit No.1 on the TVB8 Chart and won the TVB8 Best Song Awards. The "Fighting For" Music Movie was selected by the Hanoi International Film Festival 2014 to premiere in Asia, and was the only Hong Kong short film to be in competition with 30 other shorts.

== Charity work ==
In 2014 and 2015, Jade supports Maggie's Cancer Caring Centre in Hong Kong and offers her singing performances to raise money at the Fayre of St John's yearly event. Other charities & causes supported by Jade throughout the years include Filmaid using the power of film and media to transcend language and literacy, Room To Read focusing on girls' education and children's literacy in Asia and Africa, Bloomberg Charity Day, the Elephant Society working to stop the illegal trade in wildlife and animal parts, Foodlink Hong Kong mitigating hunger, fighting poverty and fostering nutritional wellness in HK, AMFAR supporting HIV/AIDS research, Asia Society forging closer ties between Asia and the West through arts, education, policy and business outreach.

== Personal life ==
Jade is a vegetarian, a daily meditator and a healthy eating advocate for battling climate change. Inspired by a serious burn accident in 2012, Jade began her journey as a vegetarian and in 2016, worked hand-in-hand with Christian Gerard Mongendre in opening a two floor plant-based restaurant in Hong Kong called HOME - Eat to Live to promote sustainable living and healthier lifestyles. The restaurant closed in 2017.

Since February 2018, Jade has been in a relationship with Han Geng, a Chinese actor, singer and former member of the South Korean boy band Super Junior. The two married on 31 December 2019 in New Zealand. In September 2022, Jade gave birth to their first child, a daughter. Their second child, a boy, was born on in October 2025.

== Filmography ==
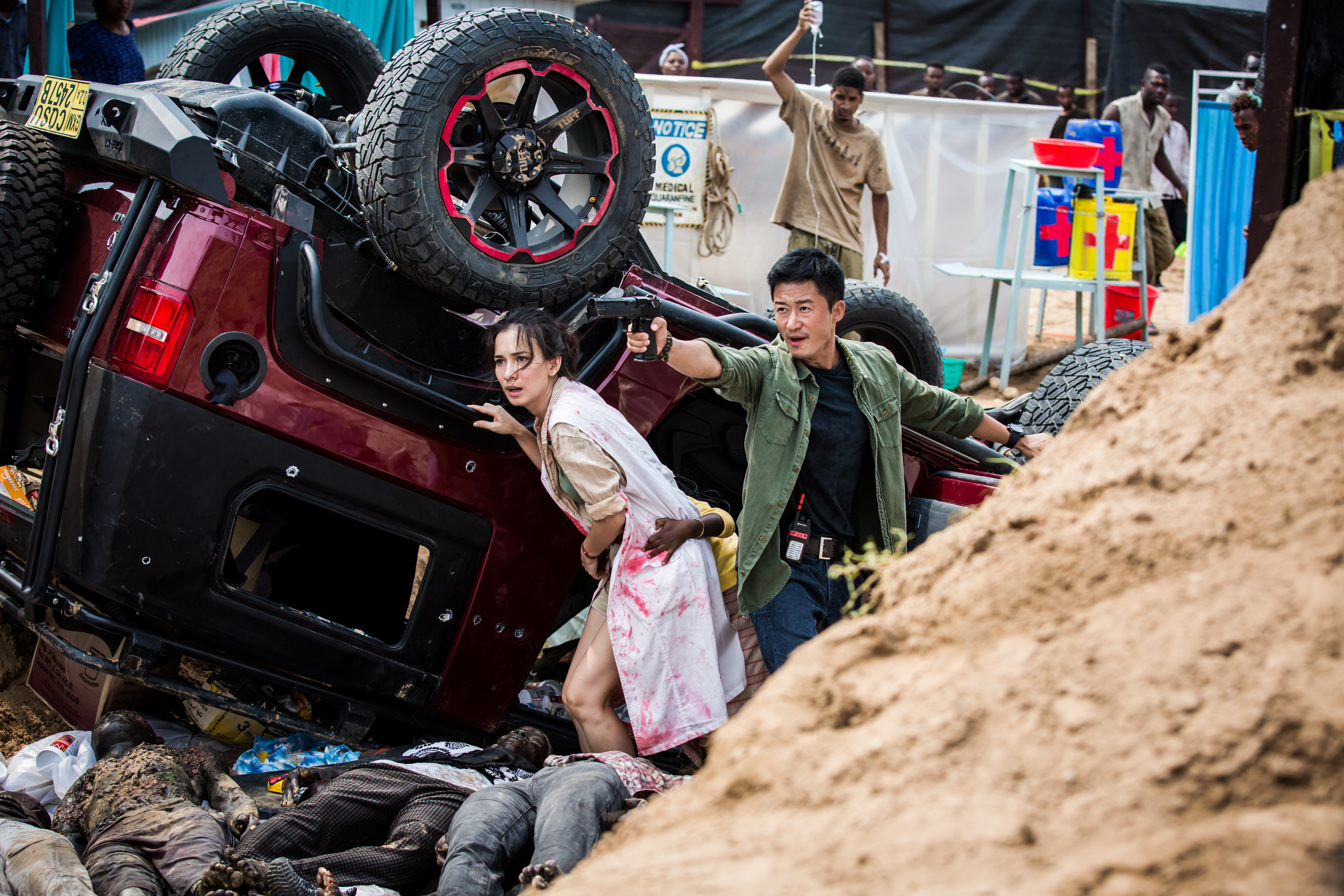
Jade and Wu Jing, on the set of Wolf Warrior 2.

Film
Year	Title	Role	Notes/Ref.
2008	Legendary Assassin	Hiu Wor	
2009	All's Well, Ends Well 2009	Gui Mui	
2009	Love Connected	Mary	
2012	Kung Fu Vettel: Drive of the Dragon	Celina Jade	Short film
2012	The Man with the Iron Fists	Dragon Inn singer	
2012	Zombie Guillotines	Assassin Nun	Short film
2012	I See You	Melissa	Short film
2013	Tomorrow Comes Today	Chin-Chin / Ting-Ting	
2014	Fighting For	Celina Jade	Music film
2014	Skin Trade	Min	
2016	April Flowers	April	
2017	Wolf Warrior 2	Dr. Rachel Prescott Smith	
2018	Hello, Mrs. Money	Monica (Aunt)	
2019	Triple Threat	Xian	
2019	A Sweet Life	Helga	
2020	My People My Hometown	Emma Maier	
2025	The Legend Hunters	Shirley Yang	

Television
Year	Title	Role	Notes/Ref.
2011	Wish Upon a Star (Xing Yuan Tong Xing)	Xiao Hui	Web series
2012	Mister French Taste	Angie Clarke	Episode: "The Job Interview"
2013–2017	Arrow	Shado/Mei	Recurring (Seasons 1-4); 21 episodes Special guest star (Season 6); 1 episode
2015	Blue Bloods	Medical Examiner	Episode: "Absolute Power"
2018	Asia's Next Top Model	Herself	Episode: "The Girl Who Can't Scream"
2020	Love Yourself	Karen	

Video games
Year	Title	Role	Notes
2012	Sleeping Dogs	Not Ping	Voice
2012	Sleeping Dogs: Nightmare in North Point	Not Ping	Voice
