= The Dragon (Arrow) =

- Arrow episode
- The title card for the episode
- Episode no.: Season 6 Episode 19
- Directed by: Gordon Verheul
- Written by: Spiro Skentzos; Elizabeth Kim
- Cinematography by: Chris Banting
- Editing by: Thomas Wallerstein
- Original air date: April 19, 2018

Guest appearances
- Kirk Acevedo as Ricardo Diaz (special guest star); Ashton Holmes as Eric Cartier; Gina Ravera as Lydia Cassamento; J. Douglas Stewart as Remy Cartier

Episode chronology
← Previous "Fundamentals"	Next → "Shifting Allegiances"
- Arrow season 6

"The Dragon" is the nineteenth episode of the sixth season, and 134th episode overall of The CW series Arrow. Unlike most Arrow episodes, and as the promotional pictures released prior to its airing hinted, "The Dragon" features minimal participation from the main cast members. Stephen Amell (Oliver Queen), Emily Bett Rickards (Felicity Smoak) and Echo Kellum (Curtis Holt) are only briefly seen as the plot focuses on main antagonist Ricardo Diaz's (Kirk Acevedo) quest of becoming a crime lord. Katie Cassidy (Laurel Lance / Black Siren) is the only main cast member to receive significant screen time due to her character aiding Diaz in his journey; none of the other main cast members appear despite being credited.

The episode was met with mixed to negative reviews by critics. Many saw it as a mere filler and an overdue attempt to work on Diaz's character development, though some praised Acevedo's and Cassidy's performances.

== Plot ==
In 1986, a young Ricardo Diaz is shown living in an orphanage. He witness Jesse, an older kid that bullies him, set fire to a photograph of Diaz's father.

In the present time, Diaz and Laurel Lance go to Blüdhaven, where he intends to join the Quadrant. (Note: A major organization that controls crime in the entire country.) Diaz and Laurel meet Eric Cartier, but Cartier is unimpressed by Diaz's takeover and has him fulfill a task in order to prove his worth and meet his father: to locate Robert Baylor, one of the Quadrant's men, who is under FBI's custody.

Diaz learns that Baylor is actually cooperating with the federals, and Cartier requests him to capture him. Diaz reluctantly agrees, but as he delivers Baylor to Cartier, the latter has both of them shot. Diaz survives due to a vest he was secretly wearing and returns to Cartier's place, where he takes out his men, lectures him on survival, explains how Jesse made him feel powerless and inferior and tortures him for information on the Quadrant's next meeting.

On their way to the Quadrant's meeting, Diaz tells Laurel about his fear of Jesse that he named it "The Dragon" and lived having nothing but that. Diaz has Cartier storm in the restaurant where the meeting is taking place while carrying C4 to take out the guards. After killing some additional men, Diaz and Laurel finally meet the Quadrant leaders face-to-face. Diaz offers them the entire Star City in exchange for a seat at the table, but Cartier is still unimpressed with Diaz's achievements and frustrated with his son's death and ends up mocking him for being nothing but a "street thug". Diaz reacts by executing him. Despite this, one of the remaining Quadrant leaders says she's interested in his proposal.

Having fulfilled his personal quest of becoming a crime lord, Diaz locates Jesse and brings him atop a building, where he shows him a recovered fragment of his burned father's picture. Diaz then burns him alive and tosses the fragment into the fire before a shocked Laurel.

Meanwhile, following her dismissal from Team Arrow, Felicity Smoak and Curtis Holt put their teams' differences aside and resume work on Helix Dynamics, but Curtis insists that they should talk about her dismissal and Oliver Queen working alone. After seeing news of the Green Arrow (Oliver) being caught in an explosion, Felicity rushes home and finds him alive and well.

== Production ==
The episode was directed by series recurring cinematographer Gordon Verheul from a story by Spiro Skentzos and Elizabeth Kim. The episode's title card replaces the arrowhead seen in previous episodes with a dragon. Apart from Acevedo as Ricardo Diaz, the additional guest cast includes Max Archibald as the younger Diaz, Ashton Holmes as Eric Cartier, Beni Gottesman as Jesse and Paul Moniz de Sá as the older Jesse.

== Reception ==
=== Broadcast ===
The episode aired on April 19, 2018. It was watched by 0.96 million viewers with a 0.3/2 share among adults aged 18 to 49. This was a 12% decrease in viewership from the previous episode, which was seen by 1.09 million viewers and a 0.4/2 in the 18–49 demographics. This means that 0.3 percent of all households with televisions watched the episode, while 2 percent of all households watching television at that time watched it.

=== Critical reception ===
"The Dragon" was met with mostly mixed or negative reviews, though at least one reviewer found it to be a standout episode.

Writing for Entertainment Weekly Chancellor Agard praised Katie Cassidy's and Emily Bett Rickards' performances in the episode, but considered many points of its plot "predictable". He also commented that the way Diaz murders Jesse is enough to prevent viewers from feeling empathy for the character and gave it a B− grade. Bleeding Cool's Dan Wickline commented that the episode helped develop Diaz.

Allison Shoemaker, from The A.V. Club, compared the episode unfavorably to season 5's "Underneath", which also focused on specific characters with limited participation of the remaining cast. According to her, "we know these characters [Diaz and Lance] a lot less well than we know Oliver and Felicity". She also said that both episodes "slow the hell down with stories that are languidly paced by their very nature", but only "Underneath" had positive results. She criticized what she saw as the writers making Black Siren a character whose main characteristic is not being Black Canary and found that the scene in which Diaz burns Jesse alive contradicts the character's development throughout the episode. On the other hand, she praised Acevedo's performance and the plot involving Smoak and Holt for being "clear, straightforward" and "incredibly precise".

In a 2/5 stars review, Den of Geek's Delia Harrington called the episode "overly long, and low on substance". She said the problems with it reflect issues of the season as a whole, which, according to her, include the absence of a good villain and the inability of the writers to establish Laurel's morals. She also said the sub-plot added "little" to the episode and that the attempt to make Diaz appear more interesting came too late. On the other hand, she considered the chemistry between Diaz and Laurel to be an interesting aspect.

Writing for IGN, Jesse Schedeen gave the episode an 8.6 ("great") score. He said it "succeeded in lending new depth to Diaz" and that "Kirk Acevedo certainly had no trouble in dominating the screen in the absence of the majority of the main cast. There's a gravity and a sense of danger to his performance, particularly now that this even darker side is coming to the forefront." He also noted that Diaz is the first main antagonist of the series who's "neither motivated by a hatred of the Green Arrow nor by a desire to destroy Star City".

On the other hand, he felt that the Felicity/Curtis' subplot "didn't really add much" and that it should have been replaced with more flashbacks of Diaz's past explaining how he became a skilled martial artist and how he entered the crime world. He also criticized the episode for failing to "offer a clear sense of where the season is headed in these final few weeks. [...] That's the problem with waiting so long to get the the [sic] meat of the conflict. As entertaining as this episode was, it also plays like a story we should have gotten several months ago."
