= Arrow season 6 =

Arrow
- Season 6
- Home media cover
- Showrunners: Wendy Mericle; Marc Guggenheim
- Starring: Stephen Amell; David Ramsey; Willa Holland; Emily Bett Rickards; Echo Kellum; Rick Gonzalez; Juliana Harkavy; Katie Cassidy; Paul Blackthorne
- No. of episodes: 23

Release
- Original network: The CW
- Original release: October 12, 2017 – May 17, 2018

Season chronology
- ← Previous; Season 5 Next → Season 7

The sixth season of the American television series Arrow premiered on The CW on October 12, 2017, and concluded on May 17, 2018, with a total of 23 episodes. The series is based on the DC Comics character Green Arrow, a costumed crime-fighter created by Mort Weisinger and George Papp, and is set in the Arrowverse, sharing continuity with other Arrowverse television series. The showrunners for this season were Marc Guggenheim and Wendy Mericle. Stephen Amell stars as Oliver Queen, with principal cast members David Ramsey as John Diggle, Willa Holland as Thea Queen, Emily Bett Rickards as Felicity Smoak, Echo Kellum as Curtis Holt and Paul Blackthorne as Quentin Lance also returning from previous seasons. Katie Cassidy, a principal cast member from seasons one to four and a guest actor for season five, was reinstated as a series regular for the sixth season as Laurel Lance / Black Siren. They are joined by Rick Gonzalez as Rene Ramirez and Juliana Harkavy as Dinah Drake, who were promoted to series regulars from their recurring status in the previous season.

The series follows billionaire playboy Oliver Queen (Stephen Amell), who claimed to have spent five years shipwrecked on Lian Yu, a mysterious island in the North China Sea, before returning home to Starling City (later renamed "Star City") to fight crime and corruption as a secret vigilante whose weapon of choice is a bow and arrow. In the sixth season after an explosive battle on Lian Yu, Oliver must balance being a vigilante, the mayor, and a father to his son William. At the same time, new enemies emerge, initially led by terrorist hacker Cayden James (Michael Emerson), who allies himself with various criminals including drug dealer Ricardo Diaz (Kirk Acevedo), metahuman vigilante Vincent Sobel (portrayed by Johann Urb, voiced by an uncredited Mick Wingert when masked), Russian mobster Anatoly Knyazev (David Nykl), and metahuman Black Siren. As James loses control of his cabal and is arrested, Ricardo Diaz comes to the fore and kills him, revealing that he manipulated James into believing Oliver killed his son and announcing to Green Arrow his scheme to take over Star City's criminal underworld and control the city's political infrastructure, all while Oliver must contend with his former teammates forming a rival team. As Diaz takes control of the city, Oliver is forced to recruit the aid of the FBI, in exchange for him publicly announcing his identity and going to federal prison. In the finale, Quentin Lance dies during the fight against Diaz's group, the FBI arrest Diaz's minions with Diaz still at large, and Oliver is imprisoned in a maximum security penitentiary.

The series was renewed for its sixth season on January 8, 2017, and filming began in Vancouver, British Columbia on July 6, 2017, and ended in late April 2018. The season received mixed reviews from critics compared to other seasons of the series. This season includes the fourth annual Arrowverse crossover with TV series The Flash, Legends of Tomorrow and Supergirl, and with elements from Freedom Fighters: The Ray. The season was released on DVD and Blu-ray on August 14, 2018. The series was renewed for a seventh season on April 2, 2018.

== Episodes ==
Arrow, season 6 episodes
No. overall	No. in season	Title	Directed by	Written by	Original release date	Prod. code	U.S. viewers (millions)
116	1	"Fallout"	James Bamford	Marc Guggenheim & Wendy Mericle	October 12, 2017	T27.13451	1.52
In flashbacks to island five months previous, Slade Wilson heads to the A.R.G.U.S. ship alone while the others take refuge in the plane. Samantha Clayton runs off to find her son, William, and Thea follows. Diggle's injured while rescuing Felicity. Following the explosion, Oliver finds Thea in critical condition. A dying Samantha asks him to look after William. Dinah Drake and Quentin Lance are attacked by Black Siren, whom he shoots. She is saved by an unknown man. In the present, Thea is still comatose and William blames Oliver for his mother's death. Black Siren and her mercenary team attack the Star City Police Department (SCPD) station. During another confrontation, John's hesitation gets Rene injured. Black Siren catches Team Arrow off guard by attacking the hideout before being driven off. Quentin's reluctance to harm Black Siren, his dead daughter's doppelgänger, allows her escape. Oliver arranges another hearing for Rene to reclaim his daughter. Curtis discovers that Black Siren stole a prototype T-sphere. Slade leaves to find his son, advising Oliver to choose between vigilantism and William. Oliver and William reconcile. Pictures of Oliver wearing the Green Arrow suit leak to the media.
117	2	"Tribute"	Laura Belsey	Story by : Adam Schwartz; Teleplay by : Marc Guggenheim & Beth Schwartz	October 19, 2017	T27.13452	1.51
Oliver publicly denies being the Green Arrow, facing an investigation by FBI agent Samanda Watson along with William's concerns of losing him. Anatoly Knyazev and his men kidnap a group of Markovian delegates, demanding a ransom. Believing Anatoly leaked the photo, Felicity and Curtis work on discrediting it while tracking the hostages, three of whom Team Arrow saves while Anatoly escapes with one. Anatoly tells Oliver that he needs to convince the Bratva that he is no longer friends with Oliver and is not weak, injecting the hostage with a toxin which will kill him soon. Detecting the toxin and acquiring the antidote, Oliver injects it into the hostage, but Anatoly kills him anyway. He escapes after telling Oliver that he did not leak the photo. The media acquires evidence from an "anonymous source" that it was faked, but Watson tells Oliver that she will continue her investigation. As John prepares to tell Oliver about his degenerative nerve damage, Oliver convinces him to wear the Green Arrow mantle, deciding to choose William over vigilantism.
118	3	"Next of Kin"	Kevin Tancharoen	Speed Weed & Oscar Balderrama	October 26, 2017	T27.13453	1.34
Team Arrow arrests the terrorist Alex Faust, with John refusing to shoot arrows. The City Council begins drafting a tighter anti-vigilante bill. Telling Dinah that he has overcome his tremors, John is revealed to have leadership problems when rogue CIA operatives begin hunting down a former member in order to silence him. Rene asks Oliver to return to the team. Oliver has Felicity help William with his mathematics test while convincing John of his competence. Team Arrow tracks down a rogue group of mercenaries led by Onyx Adams to a hotel and engages them, defeating them all and saving the civilians from a biological weapon. With no way to stop the bill, Oliver converts it to a city-wide referendum. Watson begins suspecting John being the Green Arrow. John meanwhile receives an arrow-firing crossbow invented by Felicity and Curtis. Oliver resumes his relationship with her while John is revealed to be injecting drugs to control his tremors.
119	4	"Reversal"	Gregory Smith	Sarah Tarkoff & Emilio Ortega Aldrich	November 2, 2017	T27.13454	1.33
Black Siren begins killing seemingly unimportant individuals while Felicity is approached by Alena, who tells her that Cayden James is planning to cause hundreds of millions of casualties worldwide. They meet black market dealer "Amnesiac" to buy a "ghost drive". Feeling concerned, Oliver intervenes and attacks the thugs, angering Felicity, who steals the drive. Team Arrow tracks down Black Siren to the Helix facility and discovers she is working for James, who tasks his men to kill Felicity and Alena, who is critically shot during the rescue by Team Arrow. Felicity learns that James has stolen the victims' fingerprints, necessary to enter the International Domain Name Directory (IDND), a global internet infrastructure hub. Believing that James intends to destroy the internet, Team Arrow attacks his party at the IDND, where Felicity manages to breach through the firewall to stop James' apparent attack. Felicity adds Alena to her startup, calling it Helix and intending to mass produce her spinal implant. James is revealed to have intentionally lured Felicity into breaking the firewall so that he can have secret access and covered tracks. He provides Black Siren with a device to stop Curtis' trackers. Slade calls Oliver and asks for his help.
120	5	"Deathstroke Returns"	Joel Novoa	Ben Sokolowski & Spiro Skentzos	November 9, 2017	T27.13455	1.29
Slade asks Oliver to help him find his son Joe, who is being held in jail. The two meet up in Kasnia with an old acquaintance of Slade's, Nylander, who provides them with the information they need. Oliver and Slade are told that Joe was killed in prison, but later learn that he has apparently been kidnapped by a gang called the Jackals. Slade abandons Oliver, dons the Deathstroke outfit and attacks the Jackals' base, before being confronted by Joe, revealed as the leader of the Jackals. Meanwhile, Dinah protects an anti-vigilante bill-supporting politician from the Vigilante, eventually discovering that he is actually her old partner Vincent Sobel, thought long dead. Vincent survived and was given regeneration powers by the particle accelerator, but did not approach Dinah earlier because he had lost faith in their police work. In flashbacks, Slade spends time with his son Joe camping in the forests of New Zealand. The trip is later revealed as a cover for a mission, where Slade kills a Chinese agent in an attempt to locate Yao Fei.
121	6	"Promises Kept"	Antonio Negret	Oscar Balderrama & Rebecca Bellotto	November 16, 2017	T27.13456	1.28
Slade tries to persuade Joe to leave with him, but he refuses, claiming that he saw his father kill the Chinese agent before he was influenced by Mirakuru. Slade tries to explain that it was a paid hit, but Joe refuses to forgive him, stating that learning who his father truly was led him down this path. Joe and Slade end up fighting until Oliver steps in, after which Joe escapes but not before revealing the existence of his brother, Grant. Slade tells Oliver he will continue to try and find both of his sons, but advises Oliver that he go back to his, not wanting Oliver to make the same mistakes he made. Meanwhile, Team Arrow fights against a new criminal group, led by Ricardo Diaz, who attempt to steal a valuable technology. The team eventually finds out about John's tremors, leading John to apologize to everyone. Curtis offers to help John the same way he helped Felicity when she was injured. John asks to have the night to think it over. Slade's flashbacks focus on his rise as Deathstroke and his relationship with his adolescent son Joe in ASIS.
122	7	"Thanksgiving"	Gordon Verheul	Wendy Mericle & Speed Weed	November 23, 2017	T27.13457	1.09
Oliver, Felicity, William, and Quentin organize a Thanksgiving food drive to raise money for a new SCPD precinct. Oliver is promptly arrested by Watson under charges of vigilantism for being the Green Arrow. James and Black Siren subsequently get back to causing chaos since the Green Arrow is caught. Oliver's trial is delayed and he is released on bail. When John gets injured in the field, Oliver suits up as the Green Arrow once again, helping the team try to stop a bomb planted by James and Black Siren at the stadium during a Billy Joel concert. They subsequently discover the bomb is fake and that the cops guarding the stadium are not cops; they are swiftly taken out by Dinah, Curtis, and Rene, but James and Black Siren escape. Oliver visits John in the hospital and states he will wear the hood until John has recovered, whereupon he can reclaim it. Thea wakes from her coma and has Thanksgiving dinner with Oliver, Felicity, John, and William.
123	8	"Crisis on Earth-X, Part 2"	James Bamford	Story by : Marc Guggenheim & Andrew Kreisberg; Teleplay by : Wendy Mericle & Ben Sokolowski	November 27, 2017	T27.13458	2.52
In S.T.A.R. Labs, a captured inter-dimensional villain from Earth-X, Prometheus, is revealed to be a parallel universe doppelgänger of Tommy Merlyn. After he cruelly taunts Oliver over his attachment to Earth-1's Tommy, Prometheus commits suicide out of loyalty to Earth-X's Nazi regime. Prometheus's partners, Dark Arrow (Oliver's doppelgänger), Overgirl (Kara Danvers' doppelgänger), and Eobard Thawne steal a sublight generator, the Prism, from research company Dayton Optical Systems; Oliver, Barry Allen, Kara, and the others believe that Dark Arrow seeks to build a neutron bomb with it to aid in his conquest of Earth-1. After a series of battles, most of the heroes—including Team Arrow—are held captive at S.T.A.R. Labs after Nazi forces infiltrate it. Oliver, Barry, and his allies are abducted to Earth-X's concentration camp, but Kara is moved to S.T.A.R. Labs. Oliver is determined to kill Dark Arrow after his capture. The villains reveal that Overgirl is dying and Dark Arrow plans to use the Prism, charged by S.T.A.R. Labs' particle accelerator, to produce artificial red sunlight and remove Kara and Overgirl's invulnerability, allowing a heart transplant for Overgirl but killing Kara in the process. Note : This episode continues a crossover event that begins on Supergirl season 3 episode 8, continues on The Flash season 4 episode 8, and concludes on Legends of Tomorrow season 3 episode 8.
124	9	"Irreconcilable Differences"	Laura Belsey	Beth Schwartz & Sarah Tarkoff	December 7, 2017	T27.13459	1.30
Oliver and Felicity celebrate their wedding with all of their friends. The case against Oliver intensifies when Quentin learns that a member of Team Arrow is testifying against him, causing Oliver to have the team tracked. Quentin is kidnapped by Black Siren and James. Dinah is discovered to be meeting with Vincent and tensions grow on the team until Rene admits he is the one testifying against Oliver. He explains Watson cornered him with evidence that he is Wild Dog and said that, if he did not testify, he would never be able to see his daughter again. Oliver briefly evicts Rene from the team, but the entire team puts aside any differences to rescue Quentin. Black Siren willingly allows Quentin to escape once they are outside. Oliver permanently ousts Rene for abandoning the primary mission to go looking for Lance on his own, violating Oliver's trust again. Rene is later reunited with his daughter, while Dinah and Curtis leave Team Arrow, unable to trust Oliver, John, and Felicity. Through a hidden camera, Oliver, John, and Felicity are shown being monitored by the cabal of James, his second in command Sheck, Black Siren, Anatoly, Vincent, and Diaz.
125	10	"Divided"	James Bamford	Ben Sokolowski & Emilio Ortega Aldrich	January 18, 2018	T27.13460	1.38
Oliver continues being the Green Arrow, refusing to have Rene, Dinah, and Curtis help him, while Felicity and Curtis struggle to cure John of his tremors, discovering in the process that their hideout has been bugged, forcing them to relocate to A.R.G.U.S. Oliver once again faces Cayden James, discovering that he has a cabal at his command. Dinah spends time with Vincent before discovering he has allied with Cayden James and attempts to arrest him before being overpowered. After his fight with Cayden James' Cabal, Oliver, Felicity, and John discover that, in order to win, they need to bring the team back together. Oliver apologizes to Rene, Dinah, and Curtis but, despite his apology, they refuse to return to the team. Instead, they decide to start their own team, with Oliver wishing them luck. Curtis gives Felicity a new chip implant for John's tremor problem and then shows Dinah and Rene their new hideout. Felicity puts the new chip in John curing his tremor problem and his nerve damage.
126	11	"We Fall"	Wendey Stanzler	Speed Weed & Spiro Skentzos	January 25, 2018	T27.13461	1.38
Cayden James attacks the city's critical internet infrastructure, causing numerous casualties, before demanding a ransom payment of $10 million a day to prevent future attacks. James reveals details of his vendetta against Oliver; a misfired arrow believed to be from the Green Arrow killed his son Owen a year ago. However, Oliver knows that he is not responsible because he was in Hub City at the time. Vincent claims that he is undercover with James' cabal and gives Team Arrow some intel. When one of James' attacks endangers William and his class during a field trip, Oliver is forced to reveal to his son that he resumed being the Green Arrow when he rescues him. Oliver and Quentin set up safe zones for citizens following the attacks; eventually, James' cabal targets them. Oliver and his former team put aside their differences and stop James' party's attack on the safe zones' occupants. Despite William being hurt by Oliver's lies, Felicity helps him see that it was with good intentions and gets him to accept his father's duty. Unable to find proof of his innocence before the deadline, Oliver gives into James' demands to buy time to find it.
127	12	"All for Nothing"	Mairzee Almas	Beth Schwartz & Oscar Balderrama	February 1, 2018	T27.13462	1.24
Oliver is almost out of money to pay James. Fearing he will detonate the bomb, Vince, who infiltrated James' organization, agrees to download data that could lead the two vigilante teams to where the bomb is located. Despite being successful in transmitting the data to Felicity, he is identified as the traitor, caught, and tortured by Anatoly. The location of the bomb is revealed, but Dinah, Curtis, and Rene decide not to follow Oliver in order to save Vince. However, James anticipates this and uses Vince as bait. Dinah is immobilized under collapsed rubble and is forced to watch Black Siren execute Vince. Lacking the manpower, Green Arrow and Spartan are unable to retrieve the bomb before it is relocated. However, they retrieve the falsified proof that shows Green Arrow killing James' son; the video was edited using the same technology that was used to forge the picture that exposed Oliver as the Green Arrow, implying another adversary is operating behind the scenes. Later that night, Oliver visits Dinah to see how she's doing. Dinah tells Oliver that she will get justice for Vince by murdering Cayden and his team starting with Black Siren. In flashbacks, Vincent and Dinah meet for the first time in Central City Police Department (CCPD), go on their first undercover mission to take out a drug dealer, and undergo their transformations from the particle accelerator explosion.
128	13	"The Devil's Greatest Trick"	JJ Makaro	Sarah Tarkoff & Emilio Ortega Aldrich	February 8, 2018	T27.13463	1.30
Cayden James threatens to set the bomb off at midnight. Alena and Felicity are able to decode the video of Oliver killing Cayden's son, proving it was someone else and clearing Oliver. With help from Barry Allen, Oliver is able to keep James from leaving town by showing him the new evidence. James concludes that someone in his group is behind it and asks for his former allies to be brought to him or he will set off the bomb. The team brings Laurel, Diaz, and Anatoly to James, but Laurel says she was behind his son's death and her actions allow everyone but James to escape. Diaz approaches Cayden in custody, revealing that he was responsible for the death of his son and that he has the new police captain on his payroll, killing Cayden before he leaves. Cayden's flashbacks focus on his relationship with Helix, his son Owen, his arrest by A.R.G.U.S., and the news that his son was murdered.
129	14	"Collision Course"	Ken Shane	Oscar Balderrama & Rebecca Bellotto	March 1, 2018	T27.13464	1.11
Dinah, Curtis, and Rene analyze the latest place Laurel was seen and manage to determine that she was dragged away by somebody. It turns out that Quentin took Laurel to a secure cabin to allow her to heal, which Thea eventually finds out and tells Oliver. Oliver demands the return of the city's money, which Laurel promises, if they get her out of the country. Curtis hacks the chip preventing John's tremors, allowing them to track down Oliver, John, Felicity, and, by extension, Laurel, though Quentin refuses to let Dinah kill her. The two teams fight, with Rene eventually getting injured and Oliver throwing a device that dampens Dinah's scream, allowing Laurel to incapacitate them with her own scream and escape. At the hospital, when John and Felicity come to see Rene, Curtis and Dinah turn them away, saying they want nothing to do with them anymore. At the edge of the city, Laurel begs a van driver to help her.
130	15	"Doppelganger"	Kristin Windell	Story by : Christos Gage & Ruth Fletcher Gage; Teleplay by : Speed Weed	March 8, 2018	T27.13465	1.28
Laurel appears at City Hall, revealing her story about how she was kidnapped and held against her will. Oliver and Thea find out that Diaz is keeping a hostage, revealed to be former Team Arrow member Roy Harper, prompting Thea to once again assume her vigilante persona to try and rescue him. Dinah, upon hearing of the situation, says she is willing to help out this once, but Oliver refuses, saying that, if she does not trust him, he does not trust her. Oliver and John eventually take on Diaz and his minions, who escape, but they do manage to rescue Roy. Oliver goes to see Laurel, who claims she cannot change who she is, but she will try to be good if Oliver gives her the space to do so, to which Oliver agrees. But, when he leaves, Black Siren receives a message from Diaz and smiles, implying that she is still working with him. Roy and Thea spend an evening together while observed by a woman who reports that the heir of Ra's al Ghul has been located.
131	16	"The Thanatos Guild"	Joel Novoa	Beth Schwartz & Ben Sokolowski	March 29, 2018	T27.13466	1.12
Nyssa al Ghul comes to Star City for Thea, claiming that a splinter group from the League of Assassins, The Thanatos Guild, led by a woman called Athena, is coming for her to get the location of a map that Malcolm Merlyn supposedly knew. Thea reluctantly agrees to help Nyssa, but claims she is leaving afterward. Team Arrow eventually finds the box containing the map and uses mathematics to unlock it, only for the map to be blank when opened. Felicity helps to reveal the hidden markers underneath and discovers that it contains locations to other Lazarus Pits. Dinah grows suspicious of her superior on the force, suspecting that she might be peddling Diaz's drugs. Thea talks to Oliver about handing the Green Arrow mantle back to John, but Oliver worries that the current circumstances may be a little too much for John at the moment. Thea, Roy, and Nyssa eventually depart to destroy the Lazarus Pits and Oliver says goodbye.
132	17	"Brothers in Arms"	Mark Bunting	Sarah Tarkoff & Jeane Wong	April 5, 2018	T27.13467	0.87
Dinah has Anatoly arrested, but Captain Hill and District Attorney Sam Armand force his release. Oliver confronts them with proof that they are working for Diaz and fires them when they affirm that they cannot accept his protection when faced with the threat posed by Diaz. Oliver apologizes to John about not giving him the suit. John questions Oliver's leadership skills and motives for continuing as the Green Arrow; Oliver counters that he has accepted his past mistakes. The two engage in an argument that leads to a fight. With Diaz pushing Vertigo through the city, Oliver and John work to destroy the shipment, while Curtis reveals his alter-ego to his new boyfriend, Nick Anastas. John decides to leave the team following the fight, leaving Oliver and Felicity as the final two members. Hill fires Dinah and the rest of the clean cops, forcing Nick to realize that vigilantism is the only path forward. Armand claims that Oliver obstructed justice, which is grounds for impeachment. Laurel learns that Diaz has one more vial of Vertigo and kisses him.
133	18	"Fundamentals"	Ben Bray	Speed Weed & Emilio Ortega Aldrich	April 12, 2018	T27.13468	1.06
With Oliver's impeachment hearing beginning, he loses his temper towards Felicity and William, causing Felicity to request a separation. To his horror, Oliver realizes he has been dosed with Vertigo and he begins hallucinating Adrian Chase and The Hood who torment him with reminders of his past failures. Oliver realizes that he never should have formed a "Team Arrow," allowing his loved ones to make him forget about his original mission. Learning Diaz's location, Oliver dons his original gear and attempts to take on the corrupt officers by himself. Felicity is able to bring Oliver back to his senses, revealing she never requested a separation. Oliver and Felicity escape before Diaz and his men can shoot them. Later, Oliver and William reconcile. Oliver is impeached and Quentin becomes the new Mayor of Star City. Diaz tells Laurel that, since Oliver has been impeached, it is time to inform the crime families across the country that Star City is open for business.
134	19	"The Dragon"	Gordon Verheul	Spiro Skentzos & Elizabeth Kim	April 19, 2018	T27.13469	0.96
A younger Diaz is shown in an orphanage being harassed by a bully. In the present, Diaz starts the next phase of his plan, which is to join a criminal organization called The Quadrant. One of the four leaders of the group does not think that Diaz is worthy, painting him as a street thug, and tries to have his son kill him. With Laurel's help, Diaz wages a small war on the group, killing both the man and his son, then taking his seat at the table. Later on, Diaz tracks down the man who bullied him as a child and sets him on fire as Laurel watches uncomfortably. Meanwhile, Felicity and Curtis work together again on their Helix project while Oliver works alone in Star City. An explosion happens as Oliver is fighting Diaz's men, leaving no survivors. Felicity, fearing for Oliver's life, returns home to find him safe and sound, promising her that he will never leave her.
135	20	"Shifting Allegiances"	Alexandra La Roche	Wendy Mericle & Rebecca Bellotto	April 26, 2018	T27.13470	0.87
Oliver pays a debt to Anatoly's rival in Russia, so that Anatoly will be able to go home. Oliver appeals to him, reminding him of his honor and their friendship. Anatoly betrays him, chains him, and later on takes him to see Diaz. Convinced to fight fairly by Anatoly, Diaz and Oliver square off one on one with the loser agreeing to leave the city. Oliver bests Diaz, only to be stabbed by a hidden knife. Later on, Diaz tells Oliver he is having his trial moved up and has him arrested. Meanwhile, Rene returns home, but is still affected by when he was shot. Dinah and Curtis team up with John and A.R.G.U.S. to stop a shipment of weapons by The Quadrant and are successful. As the new mayor, Quentin is approached by Diaz to sign a paper that will grant him some property in the city. Quentin refuses at first, but he eventually changes his mind out of fear for Laurel's safety after she expresses concerns about how dangerous he is.
136	21	"Docket No. 11-19-41-73"	Andi Armaganian	Story by : Marc Guggenheim; Teleplay by : Ubah Mohamed & Tyron B. Carter	May 3, 2018	T27.13471	1.10
Several witnesses are called at Oliver's trial to testify about the identity of the Green Arrow. By threatening his daughter, Diaz coerces Rene into saying Oliver is the Green Arrow at trial. After Oliver takes the stand, the Green Arrow crashes through the skylight, revealing himself to be Tommy Merlyn back from the dead. Tommy testifies that he is really the Green Arrow and is taken into custody. After being saved from Diaz's men by John and Rene, he is revealed to be Christopher Chance, the Human Target. Laurel takes the stand and, despite being threatened by Diaz earlier, testifies that Tommy is the real Green Arrow. Oliver is found guilty, proving the assumption that both the judge and the jury were in Diaz's pocket. Oliver's lawyer moves for a judgment notwithstanding verdict and the judge surprisingly agrees. Oliver returns to the lair and discovers that Chance switched places with the judge during jury deliberation. Oliver and Rene reconcile. An enraged Diaz kills the real judge just before Laurel appears and attacks him and his men, momentarily downing Diaz, before he takes her captive, telling her that he plans to kill Oliver along with his loved ones.
137	22	"The Ties That Bind"	Tara Miele	Ben Sokolowski & Oscar Balderrama	May 10, 2018	T27.13472	1.00
Diaz orchestrates attacks against Team Arrow and their loved ones; most escape unscathed, but Curtis's boyfriend Nick is seriously injured. They reunite at the New Team Arrow's bunker, where they watch as Diaz's men destroy Original Team Arrow's bunker. With Anatoly's help, Oliver ambushes Diaz, but he escapes, severely wounding Curtis. The team realizes Diaz was protecting a device containing potentially important data and sends Lyla Michaels into the SCPD headquarters to hack it. Felicity discovers it is an encrypted list of everyone on Diaz's payroll and starts attempting to decode it. Diaz kills one of the Quadrant leaders, assuming she gave Team Arrow the intel about his convoy. He attacks the new bunker, then fights with and nearly kills Oliver, who triggers explosives installed as a fail-safe against intruders. He and Felicity escape, but the still-encrypted data is lost. Diaz meets with the remaining two Quadrant leaders, kills one, and makes the other accept him as the head of the organization. Oliver turns to Watson for help; she agrees, provided he admits to her that he is the Green Arrow.
138	23	"Life Sentence"	James Bamford	Wendy Mericle & Marc Guggenheim	May 17, 2018	T27.13473	1.35
Team Arrow mounts a final attack on Diaz and, while Diaz manages to escape, Oliver obtains the list of everyone on his payroll, liberating Star City. During the attack, Quentin takes a bullet for Laurel and ends up in the hospital. The team comes to support him, including Laurel and a surprise visit from Sara Lance. However, Quentin suffers a seizure during surgery and dies. Oliver manages to get the team immunity from the FBI and police in exchange for handing himself in. Before arresting Oliver, Watson promises the team that the FBI will stay in Star City to deal with Diaz. Oliver finally admits to the public that he is the Green Arrow and urges his friends and allies to continue fighting to save the city. In prison, criminals act violently towards Oliver now that they know he is the Green Arrow.

== Cast and characters ==
=== Main ===
- Stephen Amell as Oliver Queen / Green Arrow (Note: Amell also portrays—in a less prominent capacity—Oliver Queen of Earth-X, known as Dark Arrow.)
- David Ramsey as John Diggle / Spartan / Green Arrow
- Willa Holland as Thea Queen / Speedy (Note: Holland departed the show as a series regular after "The Thanatos Guild".)
- Emily Bett Rickards as Felicity Smoak / Overwatch
- Echo Kellum as Curtis Holt / Mister Terrific
- Rick Gonzalez as Rene Ramirez / Wild Dog
- Juliana Harkavy as Dinah Drake / Black Canary
- Katie Cassidy as Laurel Lance / Black Siren (Earth-2) (Note: Cassidy also portrays the Earth-1 Laurel Lance in "Fundamentals".)
- Paul Blackthorne as Quentin Lance

=== Recurring ===
- Jack Moore as William Clayton
- Kathleen Gati as Raisa
- David Nykl as Anatoly Knyazev
- Sydelle Noel as Samanda Watson
- Venus Terzo as Elisa Schwartz
- Michael Emerson as Cayden James
- Tobias Jelinek as Sheck
- Johann Urb as Vincent Sobel / Vigilante
- Evan Roderick as Nick Anastas
- Kirk Acevedo as Ricardo Diaz / Dragon
- Pej Vahdat as Sam Armand
- Eliza Faria as Zoe Ramirez
- Tina Huang as Kimberly Hill

=== Guest ===
- Manu Bennett as Slade Wilson / Deathstroke
- Anna Hopkins as Samantha Clayton
- Dominic Bogart as Alex Faust
- Adrian Holmes as Frank Pike
- Chastity Dotson as Onyx Adams
- Kacey Rohl as Alena Whitlock
- Kris Holden-Ried as Nylander
- Liam Hall as Joe Wilson / Kane Wolfman
- Laara Sadiq as Emily Pollard
- Celina Jade as Shado
- Audrey Marie Anderson as Lyla Michaels
- Grant Gustin as Barry Allen / Flash
- Victor Garber as Martin Stein / Firestorm
- Caity Lotz as Sara Lance / White Canary
- Tom Cavanagh as Harry Wells and Eobard Thawne / Reverse-Flash
- Chyler Leigh as Alex Danvers
- Dominic Purcell as Mick Rory / Heat Wave
- Candice Patton as Iris West
- Franz Drameh as Jefferson Jackson / Firestorm
- Danielle Panabaker as Caitlin Snow / Killer Frost
- Colin Donnell as Earth-X Tommy Merlyn / Prometheus and Christopher Chance / Human Target
- Melissa Benoist as Kara Danvers / Supergirl and Overgirl
- Charlotte Ross as Donna Smoak
- Tom Amandes as Noah Kuttler
- Louis Ferreira as Jerry Bertinelli
- Patrick Sabongui as David Singh
- Steve Bacic as Sean Sonus
- Colton Haynes as Roy Harper
- Katrina Law as Nyssa al Ghul
- Kyra Zagorsky as Athena
- Josh Segarra as Adrian Chase
- Ashton Holmes as Eric Cartier
- Gina Ravera as Lydia Cassamento
- Catherine Dent as Alexa Van Owen
- Wil Traval as Christopher Chance / Human Target

== Production ==
=== Development ===
On January 8, 2017, The CW renewed Arrow for a sixth season. This was the final season to feature Wendy Mericle as showrunner; Marc Guggenheim served as co-showrunner.

=== Writing ===
The fifth-season finale ended with Oliver Queen and William Clayton witnessing the island Lian Yu explode as a result of Adrian Chase shooting himself, a dead man's switch, with many of Oliver's allies still on the island. Guggenheim said the fates of the characters would be revealed in the sixth season, but cautioned, "I know everyone is trying to determine who survives, who dies, what is the result of the cliffhanger based upon people's contractual status, and I would say that's not necessarily a good idea". He compared this to The Walking Dead season six finale because it had "a group of characters, all of whom were series regulars, in a dire situation at the end of their season. Just because they were series regulars did not mean that everyone came out of that cliffhanger alive." He also said the theme of the sixth season would be "family", adding that "last year we spent a whole season really building up this team, this new Team Arrow, and this year we've got the team in place – what sort of damage can we do? So much of Arrow lives in the challenges and trials that we put the characters through."

=== Casting ===
Main cast members Stephen Amell, David Ramsey, Willa Holland, Emily Bett Rickards, Echo Kellum and Paul Blackthorne return from previous seasons as Oliver Queen, John Diggle, Thea Queen, Felicity Smoak, Curtis Holt and Quentin Lance. Rick Gonzalez and Juliana Harkavy, who recurred in the fifth season as Rene Ramirez and Dinah Drake respectively were promoted to the principal cast for the sixth season. Katie Cassidy, who portrayed Laurel Lance / Black Canary as a regular from season one to four and recurred as the character's Earth-2 doppelganger Black Siren in season five, was reinstated as a regular for season six, playing the latter role. Cassidy also portrayed the Earth-1 Laurel in "Fundamentals". As with the fifth season, Holland was contracted only to appear in a limited number of episodes, but Guggenheim declined to reveal how many exactly. Holland left the series after her contract expired, her final appearance as a regular being "The Thanatos Guild". This was also Blackthorne's final season as a regular; he left after the season finale. Former series regulars Manu Bennett and Josh Segarra returned as Slade Wilson and Adrian Chase respectively in a guest capacity. Colin Donnell, also a former series regular, returned for two different roles as a guest: the Earth-X version of Tommy Merlyn who is that Earth's Prometheus; and Christopher Chance / Human Target disguised as the Earth-1 Tommy. Colton Haynes, who starred as Roy Harper / Arsenal in seasons two and three and was a guest star in season four, again returned in a guest capacity.

=== Design ===
Maya Mani designed the costumes for the season. Oliver's Green Arrow suit from the fifth season is retained in the sixth without any changes. Additionally, he wears his original "Hood" outfit from the first season during the episode "Fundamentals". In the sixth season, Diggle gains a new Spartan costume and helmet, which eschew the gray overtones of previous Spartan costumes, and instead have a black and red scheme. The Wild Dog costume for the season was substantially revamped; while the original introduced in season five consisted of "a hockey jersey, hockey mask and holsters", the new costume was made to be more tactical and armor-like, while retaining the older costume's color scheme. The Black Canary costume introduced in the season consists of a domino mask, long gloves and a bo staff.

=== Filming ===
Filming for the season began on July 6, 2017, in Vancouver, British Columbia. The episode "Thanksgiving" re-uses archive footage of Billy Joel from his concert of August 4, 2015, at the Nassau Coliseum in Long Island, performing the song "No Man's Land". To do this, Guggenheim personally wrote to Joel seeking permission. Filming for the season ended in late April 2018.

=== Arrowverse tie-ins ===
In May 2017, The CW president Mark Pedowitz officially announced plans for a four-show Arrowverse crossover event, crossing over episodes of the television series Supergirl, The Flash, Legends of Tomorrow, and Arrow. The crossover, Crisis on Earth-X, began with Supergirl and a special airing of Arrow on November 27, 2017, and concluded on The Flash and Legends of Tomorrow on November 28. Throughout the crossover, Stephen Amell also portrayed Oliver's Earth-X doppelganger Dark Arrow. Patrick Sabongui, who recurs as David Singh on The Flash, made a guest appearance in the episode "All for Nothing", while the character Barry Allen / The Flash did so in the following episode "The Devil's Greatest Trick"; Grant Gustin did not film any scenes, since the character is only shown speeding through lightning.

== Release ==
=== Broadcast ===
The season began airing in the United States on The CW on October 12, 2017, and completed its 23-episode run on May 17, 2018.

=== Home media ===
The season was released on DVD and Blu-ray on August 14, 2018, with special features including the fourth annual Arrowverse crossover event titled "Crisis on Earth-X". It began streaming on Netflix in May 2018, soon after the season finale aired.

== Reception ==
=== Critical response ===
The review aggregation website Rotten Tomatoes reported a 64% approval rating for the sixth season, with an average rating of 6.86/10 based on 186 reviews. The website's critical consensus reads, "Arrow's sixth season deals with the literal fallout from the explosion in season five's finale and promises a drastic change in direction for the series." Jesse Schedeen of IGN rated the entire season 6.7 out of 10, saying, "Arrow's sixth season may not qualify as the show's worst, but only because it improved a great deal in its final two months. Prior to that, the season squandered most of the potential afforded by Season 5, failing to balance its many characters and languishing under a disappointingly bland villain. It's good that the show eventually regained its footing, but there's no reason things should have gone so far off the rails in the first place."

=== Ratings ===
Viewership and ratings per episode of Arrow season 6
No.	Title	Air date	Rating/share (18–49)	Viewers (millions)	DVR (18–49)	DVR viewers (millions)	Total (18–49)	Total viewers (millions)
1	"Fallout"	October 12, 2017	0.6/2	1.52	0.5	1.18	1.1	2.70
2	"Tribute"	October 19, 2017	0.5/2	1.51	0.5	1.08	1.0	2.59
3	"Next of Kin"	October 26, 2017	0.5/2	1.34	0.4	1.05	0.9	2.38
4	"Reversal"	November 2, 2017	0.5/2	1.33	0.4	0.90	0.9	2.23
5	"Deathstroke Returns"	November 9, 2017	0.5/2	1.29	0.4	1.08	0.9	2.37
6	"Promises Kept"	November 16, 2017	0.5/2	1.28	—N/a	0.92	—N/a	2.20
7	"Thanksgiving"	November 23, 2017	0.3/1	1.09	0.5	1.07	0.8	2.16
8	"Crisis on Earth-X, Part 2"	November 27, 2017	0.9/3	2.52	0.8	1.89	1.7	4.41
9	"Irreconcilable Differences"	December 7, 2017	0.4/2	1.30	0.4	0.86	0.8	2.12
10	"Divided"	January 18, 2018	0.5/2	1.38	0.4	1.00	0.9	2.38
11	"We Fall"	January 25, 2018	0.4/2	1.38	0.4	0.96	0.8	2.34
12	"All for Nothing"	February 1, 2018	0.4/2	1.24	0.4	0.89	0.8	2.13
13	"The Devil's Greatest Trick"	February 8, 2018	0.4/2	1.30	0.4	0.92	0.8	2.21
14	"Collision Course"	March 1, 2018	0.4/2	1.11	0.4	1.02	0.8	2.13
15	"Doppelganger"	March 8, 2018	0.4/2	1.28	—N/a	0.86	—N/a	2.15
16	"The Thanatos Guild"	March 29, 2018	0.4/2	1.12	0.4	0.95	0.8	2.07
17	"Brothers in Arms"	April 5, 2018	0.3/1	0.87	0.3	0.84	0.6	1.74
18	"Fundamentals"	April 12, 2018	0.4/2	1.06	0.3	0.82	0.7	1.89
19	"The Dragon"	April 19, 2018	0.3/1	0.96	0.4	0.78	0.7	1.75
20	"Shifting Allegiances"	April 26, 2018	0.3/1	0.87	0.3	0.87	0.6	1.74
21	"Docket No. 11-19-41-73"	May 3, 2018	0.4/2	1.10	0.3	0.80	0.7	1.90
22	"The Ties That Bind"	May 10, 2018	0.3/1	1.00	0.4	0.85	0.7	1.91
23	"Life Sentence"	May 17, 2018	0.4/2	1.35	0.4	0.76	0.8	2.11

=== Accolades ===
Arrow, season 6 award nominations
Year	Award	Category	Nominee(s)	Result	Ref.
2018	Leo Awards	Best Cinematography Dramatic Series	Corey Robson ("Who Are You?")	Nominated	
2018	Leo Awards	Best Stunt Coordination Dramatic Series	Curtis Braconnier, Eli Zagoudakis ("Fallout")	Nominated	
2018	People's Choice Awards	The Sci-Fi/Fantasy Show of 2018	Arrow	Nominated	
2018	Saturn Awards	Best Superhero Adaptation Television Series	Arrow	Nominated	
2018	Teen Choice Awards	Choice Action TV Actor	Stephen Amell	Nominated	
2018	Teen Choice Awards	Choice Action TV Actress	Emily Bett Rickards	Nominated	
2018	Teen Choice Awards	Choice TV Ship	Stephen Amell and Emily Bett Rickards	Nominated	
2018	Teen Choice Awards	Choice Action TV Show	Arrow	Nominated	
