= List of supporting Arrow characters =

Arrow is an American superhero television series developed by Greg Berlanti, Marc Guggenheim, and Andrew Kreisberg based on the DC Comics character Green Arrow, a costumed crime-fighter created by Mort Weisinger and George Papp, and is set in the Arrowverse, sharing continuity with other Arrowverse television series. The series premiered in the United States on The CW on October 10, 2012, with international broadcasting taking place in late 2012 and primarily filmed in Vancouver, British Columbia, Canada. Arrow follows billionaire playboy Oliver Queen (Stephen Amell), who claimed to have spent five years shipwrecked on Lian Yu, a mysterious island in the North China Sea, before returning home to Starling City (later renamed "Star City") to fight crime and corruption as a secret vigilante whose weapon of choice is a bow and arrow.

Throughout the series, Oliver is joined by others in his quest, among them former soldier John Diggle (David Ramsey), I.T. expert and skilled hacker Felicity Smoak (Emily Bett Rickards), former assassin Sara Lance (Caity Lotz), aspiring vigilante Roy Harper (Colton Haynes), Oliver's sister Thea (Willa Holland), and attorney-turned-vigilante Laurel Lance (Katie Cassidy). The group also receives support from Laurel and Sara's father Officer Quentin Lance (Paul Blackthorne). During the first five seasons of the show, characters from Oliver's past appear in a separate story arc based on Oliver's flashbacks, which highlight parallels from Oliver's history that shape events in the main story. Starting with season seven, a series of flash-forwards focus on Oliver's children William and Mia, exploring how present events would affect their future and Green Arrow's legacy.

The following is a list of recurring and significant guest characters who have appeared in the television series, listed in alphabetical order by surname; for a list of main characters see List of Arrow characters. Many of the characters appearing in the series are based on DC Comics characters.

== Overview ==
Character	Portrayed by	First appearance	Seasons							
Character	Portrayed by	First appearance	1	2	3	4	5	6	7	8
Walter Steele	Colin Salmon	"Pilot"	Recurring	Recurring						
Raisa	Kathleen Gati	"Pilot"	Guest					Recurring		
Robert Queen	Jamey Sheridan	"Pilot"	Recurring		Guest	Guest	Guest		Guest	
Joanna De La Vega	Annie Ilonzeh	"Pilot"	Recurring	Guest						
Lucas Hilton	Roger Cross	"Pilot"	Recurring	Guest	Guest					
Sara Lance / The Canary / White Canary	Jacqueline MacInnes Wood	"Pilot"	Guest							
Sara Lance / The Canary / White Canary	Caity Lotz	"City of Heroes"		Recurring	Recurring	Recurring	Guest	Guest	Guest	Guest
Chien Na Wei / China White	Kelly Hu	"Honor Thy Father"	Recurring	Guest	Guest		Guest		Guest	Guest
Yao Fei Gulong	Byron Mann	"Lone Gunmen"	Recurring				Guest			Guest
Carly Diggle	Christie Laing	"Lone Gunmen"	Recurring							
Edward Fyers	Sebastian Dunn	"Damaged"	Recurring							Guest
Kate Spencer	Chelah Horsdal	"Damaged"	Guest	Recurring						
McKenna Hall	Janina Gavankar	"Vertigo"	Recurring							
Frank Pike	Adrian Holmes	"Betrayal"	Guest	Recurring	Guest	Guest	Recurring	Guest		
Shado/Mei	Celina Jade	"The Odyssey"	Recurring	Recurring	Guest	Guest		Guest		
Frank Chen	Chin Han	"Dodger"	Recurring							
Lyla Michaels / Harbinger	Audrey Marie Anderson	"Unfinished Business"	Guest	Recurring	Recurring	Recurring	Recurring	Recurring	Recurring	Recurring
Isabel Rochev	Summer Glau	"City of Heroes"		Recurring						
Adam Donner	Dylan Bruce	"City of Heroes"		Recurring						
Bethany Snow	Keri Adams	"City of Heroes"		Recurring	Recurring	Recurring	Recurring	Recurring	Recurring	Guest
Ben Turner / Bronze Tiger	Michael Jai White	"Identity"		Guest					Recurring	
Sebastian Blood / Brother Blood	Kevin Alejandro	"Identity"		Recurring						
Jean Loring	Teryl Rothery	"Broken Dolls"		Recurring				Guest		
Cindy "Sin" Simone	Bex Taylor-Klaus	"Broken Dolls"		Recurring	Guest				Guest	
Daily	Jesse Hutch	"Crucible"		Recurring						
Anatoly Knyazev	David Nykl	"Crucible"		Recurring			Recurring	Recurring	Guest	Guest
Dr. Anthony Ivo	Dylan Neal	"League of Assassins"		Recurring						
Amanda Waller	Cynthia Addai-Robinson	"Keep Your Enemies Closer"		Recurring	Recurring	Guest				
Nyssa al Ghul	Katrina Law	"Heir to the Demon"		Guest	Recurring	Recurring	Guest	Guest	Guest	Guest
Maseo Yamashiro / Sarab	Karl Yune	"The Calm"			Recurring					
Tatsu Yamashiro	Rila Fukushima	"The Calm"			Recurring	Guest				Guest
Ted Grant / Wildcat	J. R. Ramirez	"The Calm"			Recurring					
Ray Palmer / The Atom	Brandon Routh	"The Calm"			Recurring	Recurring	Guest			Guest
Sara Diggle	Unknown	"The Calm"			Recurring	Recurring				
Akio Yamashiro	Brandon Nomura	"The Calm"			Recurring					
Ra's al Ghul	Matt Nable	"The Magician"			Recurring					
Donna Smoak	Charlotte Ross	"The Secret Origin of Felicity Smoak"			Guest	Recurring		Guest		
Daniel Brickwell / Brick	Vinnie Jones	"Left Behind"			Guest	Guest			Recurring	
Matthew Shrieve	Marc Singer	"The Return"			Recurring					
Andy Diggle	Eugene Byrd	"The Return"			Guest	Recurring				
Michael Amar / Murmur	Adrian Glynn McMorran	"The Offer"			Guest	Recurring				
Damien Darhk	Neal McDonough	"Green Arrow"				Recurring	Guest			
Baron Reiter	Jimmy Akingbola	"The Candidate"				Recurring				
Taiana Venediktov	Elysia Rotaru	"The Candidate"				Recurring				
Lonnie Machin / Anarky	Alexander Calvert	"The Candidate"				Recurring	Guest			
Conklin	Ryan Robbins	"Restoration"				Recurring				
Alex Davis	Parker Young	"Haunted"				Recurring				
Ruvé Adams	Janet Kidder	"Dark Waters"				Recurring				
Paul Holt	Chernier Hundal	"Dark Waters"				Recurring	Guest			
Noah Kuttler / Calculator	Tom Amandes	"Unchained"				Recurring		Guest		
Dr. Elisa Schwartz	Venus Terzo	"Unchained"				Guest	Guest	Recurring	Guest	Guest
Evelyn Sharp / Artemis	Madison McLaughlin	"Canary Cry"				Guest	Recurring			
Tobias Church	Chad L. Coleman	"Legacy"					Recurring			
Billy Malone	Tyler Ritter	"Legacy"					Recurring			
Viktor	Mike Dopud	"Legacy"					Recurring			
Rory Regan / Ragman	Joe Dinicol	"The Recruits"					Recurring		Guest	Guest
Susan Williams	Carly Pope	"A Matter of Trust"					Recurring			
Derek Sampson	Cody Runnels	"A Matter of Trust"					Guest		Recurring	
Konstantin Kovar	Dolph Lundgren	"So It Begins"					Recurring			
Ishmael Gregor	David Meunier	"So It Begins"					Recurring			
Talia al Ghul	Lexa Doig	"Who Are You?"					Recurring		Guest	Guest
Alena Whitlock	Kacey Rohl	"Second Chances"					Recurring	Guest	Recurring	
Vincent Sobel / Vigilante	Clayton Chitty	"Second Chances"					Recurring			
Vincent Sobel / Vigilante	Johann Urb	"Deathstroke Returns"						Recurring		
Emily Pollard	Laara Sadiq	"Spectre of the Gun"					Guest	Guest	Recurring	
Zoe Ramirez	Eliza Faria	"Spectre of the Gun"					Guest	Recurring	Recurring	Guest
Zoe Ramirez	Andrea Sixtos	"Level Two"							Recurring	Recurring
Samanda Watson	Sydelle Noel	"Tribute"						Recurring	Guest	
Cayden James	Michael Emerson	"Reversal"						Recurring		
Sheck	Tobias Jelinek	"Reversal"						Recurring		
Nick Anastas	Evan Roderick	"Deathstroke Returns"						Recurring	Recurring	
Sam Armand	Pej Vahdat	"Thanksgiving"						Recurring		
Kimberly Hill	Tina Huang	"All for Nothing"						Recurring		
P. Parks	Josh Byer	"Doppelganger"						Recurring		
Stanley Dover	Brendan Fletcher	"Inmate 4587"							Recurring	
Honor / Silencer	Miranda Edwards	"The Longbow Hunters"							Recurring	
Kodiak	Michael Jonsson	"The Longbow Hunters"							Recurring	
Bell	David Stuart	"The Longbow Hunters"							Recurring	
Keven Dale (adult)	Raj Paul	"My Name Is Emiko Queen"							Recurring	
Virgil	Christopher Gerard	"Brothers & Sisters"							Recurring	
Sgt. F. Bingsley	Danny Wattley	"Training Day"							Recurring	
John Diggle Jr. (adult)	Charlie Barnett	"Starling City"								Recurring

== A ==
=== Kazumi Adachi ===
Kazumi Adachi (portrayed by Jeanie Cloutier) is the mother of Emiko Queen, born out of an affair Kazumi had with Robert Queen. Prior to the events of the seventh season, Kazumi is murdered by Kodiak of the Longbow Hunters. The hit was ordered by Dante, who wanted Emiko to be strong enough to lead the Ninth Circle and viewed her relationship with her mother as a weakness.

=== Cecil Adams / The Count / Count Vertigo ===
Cecil Adams / The Count / Count Vertigo (portrayed by Seth Gabel) is the dealer of the deadly narcotic known as Vertigo. Having already hated The Count for his sister Thea's Vertigo addiction, Oliver kills the drug lord in season two when The Count is holding Felicity hostage. In the fifth season's episode, "Kapiushon", his real name is revealed to be Cecil Adams.

=== Ruvé Adams ===
Ruvé Adams (portrayed by Janet Kidder) is the wife of Damien Darhk who shares his ambitions and campaigns against Oliver for mayor of Star City. She wins the election and becomes mayor after Oliver drops out of the race. In "Lost in the Flood", she is held captive by Lonnie Machin, who stabs her in the chest with an arrow. Unable to move, she is crushed by falling debris from the destruction of Darhk's nuclear bomb shelter. Before she dies, she asks Oliver to save her daughter.

=== Barry Allen / Flash (Earth-1) ===
Barry Allen / Flash (portrayed by Grant Gustin) is a young crime scene investigator from the Central City Police Department. Oliver first meets Barry when the latter arrives to personally investigate a superhuman-related crime in Starling City. Barry discovers that Oliver is his vigilante idol, the Arrow, saves Oliver's life and helps him to begin uncovering the Mirakuru plot orchestrated by Slade Wilson. Ultimately, both Barry and Oliver become good friends and they occasionally offer each other advice and support. Barry later gains the power of super-speed, and is inspired by Oliver's example to become a hero known as the "Flash". He occasionally joins Oliver on missions and remains a trusted friend and ally. Gustin stars as the character on The Flash.

=== Michael Amar / Murmur ===
Michael Amar / Murmur (portrayed by Adrian Glynn McMorran) is a man whose mouth is sewn shut, who enacts a deadly revenge scheme on the Starling City police for imprisoning him in Iron Heights Penitentiary on a false confession. He escapes in Darhk's prison riot and joins H.I.V.E., but is captured and returned to prison.

=== Nick Anastas ===
Nick Anastas (portrayed by Evan Roderick) is a Star City police officer who initially had a firm anti-vigilante stance of the Star City Police Department. He is also the boyfriend of Curtis Holt. Nick is one of the few honest cops that do not side with Diaz.

=== Sam Armand ===
Sam Armand (portrayed by Pej Vahdat) is a corrupt district attorney and ally of Diaz. Sam is fired by Oliver after he discovers his allegiance to Diaz. He is later arrested by Samantha Watson after the F.B.I. obtains evidence of his crimes.

=== Athena ===
Athena (portrayed by Kyra Zagorsky) is a former member of the League of Assassins once associated with Malcolm Merlyn as his second-in command. She took the position as leader of the Thanatos Guild that was supposed to be led by Merlyn prior to his death. In the final season, Athena is the leader of the League. She ambushes Oliver, Thea and Nyssa who are trying to infiltrate a base for ancient texts on the Monitor and she ends up being crushed by falling debris ending the Thanatos Guild.

== B ==
=== Frank Bertinelli ===
Frank Bertinelli (portrayed by Jeffrey Nordling) is Helena's mob boss father who is loosely based on the comic book character Guido Bertinelli. He is killed in the episode "Birds of Prey", but not by Helena.

=== Helena Bertinelli / Huntress ===
Helena Bertinelli / Huntress (portrayed by Jessica De Gouw) is a vigilante who seeks revenge against her mob boss father and his associates for murdering her fiancé. Oliver makes a connection with her and tries to help her. They develop feelings for each other until Helena realizes Oliver still has feelings for Laurel, causing a rift. Helena's revenge is thwarted by Oliver, who puts her father in jail, making an enemy of her

=== Sebastian Blood / Brother Blood ===
Sebastian Blood / Brother Blood (portrayed by Kevin Alejandro) is a savvy politician who is working with Slade Wilson, a friend of Oliver Queen and romantic interest of Laurel Lance. He is a city alderman who is running for mayor to create his vision of Starling City. He leads a double life as a criminal, wearing a skull mask based on the nightmares he had of his late-father, called "Brother Blood". Seemingly benign, over the course of season two Sebastian is gradually revealed to be narcissistic and directly responsible for the murders of his parents. When Slade kills Moira Queen, the only other mayoral candidate, Sebastian becomes the mayor of Starling City. When Oliver and Laurel are close to discovering his secret, he misdirects them by having Laurel kill a decoy in the skull mask. Laurel uncovers his secret and Oliver tries to reason with Sebastian. Sebastian is betrayed by Slade, causing him to give the Mirakuru cure to Oliver, for which he is killed by Isabel Rochev.

=== Daniel Brickwell ===
Danny "Brick" Brickwell (portrayed by Vinnie Jones) is a gang leader in Starling City. He earns the nickname "Brick" from being shot multiple times, without ever being put down. Brick organizes the takeover of the Glades in Oliver's absence and is later revealed to have killed Malcolm's wife, Rebecca, and thus is the indirect catalyst for the events of the series. Damien Darhk extorts Brick into joining H.I.V.E. after they escape from prison.

In season seven, Brick is shown as an inmate at Slabside Maximum Security Prison. Brick tells Oliver about the "Demon" that Ricardo Diaz has been using to forward his orders to. When Diaz takes control of the prison, Brick sides with him. Following Oliver defeating Diaz, Brick tries to escape through the morgue only to be stabbed by Stanley Dover.

== C ==
=== Lydia Cassamento ===
Lydia Cassamento (portrayed by Gina Ravera) is a member of The Quadrant who worked alongside Ricardo Diaz until she met her death at his hands.

=== Celia Castle ===
Celia Castle (portrayed by Christina Cox) succeeded Sebastian Blood as the mayor of Starling City until being killed by Maseo Yamashiro.

=== Christopher Chance / Human Target ===
Christopher Chance / Human Target (portrayed by Wil Traval) is hired by Oliver to serve as his body double when he is mayor. He is later summoned by John Diggle to pose as Tommy Merlyn in Green Arrow's costume during Oliver Queen's trial and later takes the place of Judge C. McGarvey. Upon the jury finding Oliver Queen guilty, Chance as Judge McGarvey has Oliver Queen seek probation and then he is free to go. After the trial is over and Chance unmasks himself to Oliver, he insists the team not seek his help for another year.

=== Chase ===
Chase (portrayed by Austin Butler) is a DJ who becomes Thea's romantic interest. It is revealed that he is a spy for the League of Assassins, and he commits suicide rather than be captured.

=== Doris Chase ===
Doris Chase (portrayed by Parveen Dosanjh) is the wife of Adrian Chase. She is unaware of her husband being the killer Prometheus until Oliver and Diggle bring her to an unmasked Adrian in the Prometheus outfit. When Doris tries to get Adrian to abandon his crusade against the Green Arrow, her husband kills her.

=== Frank Chen ===
Frank Chen (portrayed by Chin Han) is a wealthy businessman and close friend of the Queen family who had a mysterious connection to The Undertaking until he is killed by Malcolm.

=== Ryan Choi ===
Ryan Choi (portrayed by Osric Chau) is a scientist from Ivy Town who helped out during the Crisis.

=== Tobias Church ===
Tobias "Charon" Church (portrayed by Chad L. Coleman) is an imposing gangster looking to unite the various criminal enterprises in Star City under his own singular command. Church sought to eliminate Green Arrow to proceed with his plan to use Star City's docks to ship drugs and weapons to the major crime families of other cities with ease, having frequent encounters with him. After capturing and torturing the Green Arrow's sidekick, Rene Ramirez / Wild Dog, Church learns his identity is Oliver Queen, but is defeated by him. While being transferred to Iron Heights prison, Church is murdered by Prometheus for ignoring his warnings to not target Green Arrow.

=== Samantha Clayton ===
Samantha Clayton (portrayed by Anna Hopkins) is the mother of Oliver's son William. Oliver dated Samantha in college while in his relationship with Laurel, and she became pregnant. Moira bribed her to tell Oliver that she miscarried, and she moved to Central City, where she had their son. Oliver does not find out about William's existence for about a decade. A year after Oliver learns of his fatherhood, Samantha and William are abducted by Adrian Chase and his allies. After the Lian Yu explosion, Samantha is badly injured and later dies in Oliver's arms, asking him to look out for her son. Her parents then blame Oliver for Samantha's death, and later sever William's familial ties with his father after they gain legal custody of their grandson.

=== Conklin ===
Conklin (portrayed by Ryan Robbins) is a member of Shadowspire in the series flashbacks. Conklin is highly suspicious of Oliver and his presence on Lian Yu, and regularly tries to convince his boss, Reiter, not to trust Oliver. He is later killed by Oliver when the two are left alone in a room and fight in hand-to-hand combat. In "Taken", a primordial energy takes the form of Conklin and stands at the entrance of the cave, speaking in tongues, but disappears when it notices the spell tattoo on Oliver's chest and deemed him worthy to pass.

=== John Constantine ===
John Constantine (portrayed by Matt Ryan) is an enigmatic and irreverent former con man who is now a reluctant occult detective. Ryan appears in the fourth season's fifth episode per a "one-time-only-deal". Constantine is an associate of Oliver's ever since they met on Lian Yu and plays a pivotal role in completing Sara Lance's resurrection. Ryan reprises his role from the series Constantine and went on to reprise the role in the third, fourth and fifth seasons of Legends of Tomorrow.

=== Carrie Cutter / Cupid ===
Carrie Cutter / Cupid (portrayed by Amy Gumenick) is a lethal villain with a dangerously obsessive crush on the Arrow but is later enrolled into the Suicide Squad, where she forms a crush on Floyd Lawton / Deadshot. After Oliver Queen's identities as Arrow and Green Arrow are revealed, she develops a grudge against Felicity Smoak due to now knowing she is married to her object of obsession.

== D ==
=== Keven Dale ===
Keven Dale (portrayed by Raj Paul) is the head of Galaxy One in the 2040 flashforwards and the main antagonist of season seven's future arc. His organization hunts down vigilantes with Felicity Smoak's Archer program. Aman Mann plays the teenage version in the present.

=== Jessica Danforth ===
Jessica Danforth (portrayed by Jeri Ryan) is a friend of the Queen family and mayoral candidate for Star City who drops out of the race after her daughter's kidnapping.

=== Dante ===
Dante (portrayed by Adrian Paul) is a high-ranking member of the Ninth Circle. He is Emiko Queen's mentor and trainer, having taken her under his wing when she was abandoned by her father Robert Queen. He finances terrorist activities around the world and ends up on A.R.G.U.S.' radar when Ricardo Diaz hires the Longbow Hunters through him. Secretly, Dante hired Kodiak of the Longbow Hunters to kill Emiko's mother and manipulate Emiko into joining the Ninth Circle. When Emiko learns of this, she kills Dante.

=== Dinah Lance ===
Dinah Lance (portrayed by Alex Kingston) is the mother of Laurel and Sara, and Quentin's ex-wife. Dinah is a European history professor. Prior to Sara's disappearance, Dinah learned of her youngest daughter's relationship with Oliver, and is guilt-ridden for failing to stop her after the incident. After Sara's presumed death, Dinah's marriage with Quentin deteriorates and they divorce. She then leaves her family to find her daughter, correctly believing that she is alive. Dinah remarries after settling in Central City. Despite separating herself from Quentin after Sara's return, Dinah remains close to him and their daughters, and encourages Quentin to move on from their past.

=== Alex Danvers ===
Alex Danvers (portrayed by Chyler Leigh) is the adoptive sister of Kara Danvers and second-in-command of Department of Extranormal Operations. Leigh reprises her role from Supergirl. Leigh later portrayed Alex's Earth-1 equivalent in the crossover "Elseworlds", who learns details of her Earth-38 counterpart's life from Kara.

=== Kara Danvers / Supergirl ===
Kara Danvers / Supergirl (portrayed by Melissa Benoist) is Barry Allen's friend and ally from another universe, whom Oliver also ultimately befriends during an alien invasion crisis. Benoist reprises her role from the series Supergirl. In season six, Benoist portrays Kara's Earth-X doppelgänger, Overgirl, who is Oliver's doppelgänger's Kryptonian bride.

=== Damien Darhk ===
Damien Darhk (portrayed by Neal McDonough) is a former member of the League of Assassins and a friend-turned-adversary to Raʾs al Ghul. He is the main antagonist of season four. Years ago, Darhk left the League after being denied its leadership, taking a sample of the Lazarus Pit and several League members with him after Raʾs failed orders to execute him. He leads his own clandestine group, H.I.V.E., and plots to start a nuclear holocaust to rule a post-apocalyptic world in a plan known as "Genesis". According to Raʾs, Darhk also orchestrated Bronze Tiger's plot to steal Malcolm's prototype earthquake machine and Mark Shaw's attempt to acquire the A.R.G.U.S. file. In season four, he is introduced as the main antagonist, a formidable hand-to-hand combatant with mystical abilities—he can remotely manipulate objects and people, and can drain the life force from a person through physical contact. Darhk becomes enemies of Green Arrow and Oliver, believing the two are working together and not the same man (although he does express suspicions). Darhk also kidnapped Ray Palmer to steal his technology for Genesis. He ultimately deduces the true identities of the entire Arrow team. Despite being a sadistic terrorist leader, Darhk is also a loving father and husband; his wife, Ruvé Adams, also shares her spouse's cruelty and is supportive of his endeavors. Through Malcolm, Darhk learns that Oliver has fathered a son and uses him as a means to scuttle Oliver's mayoral campaign. Quentin and Mari McCabe discover that a mystical idol in Darhk's possession is the source of his supernatural powers, and Mari destroys it, leaving Darhk powerless and imprisoned. He later escapes with the assistance of Malcolm and Andy, regaining his powers from his rebuilt idol in the process, and kills Quentin's daughter, Laurel, in retaliation for his imprisonment. Following the destruction of Genesis and his wife's death, Darhk attempts to destroy all of Star City, but the idol is destroyed once more, nullifying his powers. Darhk fights Oliver but is overpowered, and taunts Oliver stating he spared Slade Wilson when he killed his mother. Oliver reminds Darhk of his crimes and kills him. McDonough goes to reprise his role in the second, third and fifth season of DC's Legends of Tomorrow.

=== Alex Davis ===
Alex Davis (portrayed by Parker Young) is an employee of Oliver's mayoral campaign and love interest for Thea. When Oliver drops out of the mayoral race, he starts to work for Ruvé Adams and it is later revealed that he is being controlled by her. Alex is killed by Lonnie Machin when he stumbles into a fight between Thea and Lonnie, due to Lonnie believing that Alex is clouding Thea's mind.

=== Andy Diggle ===
Andrew Diggle (portrayed by Eugene Byrd) is the brother of John Diggle who is first seen as a bodyguard in a season three flashback, but was previously known to have been killed by the H.I.V.E. organization, which hired Floyd Lawton as their hitman. However, Andy led a double life in the military as a drug lord associated with the Shadowspire organization in Afghanistan; H.I.V.E. faked Andy's death and he eventually became one of Damien Darhk's "Ghosts". John suspects that Andy joined H.I.V.E. of his own free will, and tries to reconcile with his brother while saving him from damnation. Andy later helps John and Lyla stop Shadowspire from obtaining a weapon from A.R.G.U.S and is welcomed back into the family by John, but this proved to be a facade to get closer to Team Arrow. Later, he works with Malcolm Merlyn to get Darhk out of prison, and restore Darhk's powers. Andy's actions result in Laurel's death at Darhk's hands. As a result, John pursues and kills Andy to protect the rest of his family.

=== John Diggle Jr. ===
John "JJ" Diggle Jr. (portrayed by Charlie Barnett) is the biological son of John Diggle and Lyla Michaels, who leads the "Deathstroke Gang" in the 2040 flashforwards. He has fallen out with both his father and his adopted brother Connor. When Connor contacts JJ for the first time in a year, JJ sends his gang to kill Connor. After the vigilantes bring down the wall separating Star City from the Glades at the end of season seven, the Deathstroke Gang grow more powerful and amass additional territory with JJ claiming ownership of the city. After the Crisis, JJ's entire history has changed; his father makes sure that JJ would grow up well-adjusted. In 2040, JJ is not a Deathstroke and works as a curator of Star City's Vigilante Museum, and is having a strained relationship with Connor. However, someone from the Queen family's past restores JJ's memories from the initial timeline.

Diggle and Michaels originally had a daughter named Sara, but Barry Allen's time traveling and creation (and subsequent erasure) of the Flashpoint timeline results in her being replaced by JJ. Keon Boateng and Marcello Guedes portray JJ as a child from season five to seven. After the Crisis, Sara is restored to the timeline, existing simultaneously with her brother.

=== Carly Diggle ===
Carly Diggle (portrayed by Christie Laing) is a love interest of John Diggle and widow of his brother, Andy. They eventually broke up because of Diggle's obsession with Deadshot.

=== Adam Donner ===
Adam Donner (portrayed by Dylan Bruce) is an assistant district attorney who becomes Laurel's boss in season two. Adam is fired later in the season.

=== Stanley Dover ===
Stanley Dover (portrayed by Brendan Fletcher) is a man incarcerated at Slabside Maximum Security Prison for a murder he claims he did not commit. He has a deep admiration for Oliver Queen. However, Oliver figured out that he framed Bronze Tiger for stabbing a guard and declines having Laurel Lance getting him released. When Ricardo Diaz takes control of the prison, Stanley admits that he is a serial killer to Oliver. When escaping, Stanley stabs Brick with a scalpel to get back at him for the torment he caused him and escapes through the morgue. Stanley returns to Star City as the "Star City Slayer", targeting members of Team Arrow, thinking they are bad for Oliver. He slits Dinah's throat, which has a permanent effect on her; causing her pain whenever she uses her sonic scream. After confronting Oliver, Felicity and William at their apartment, he is subdued by Oliver and returned to Slabside.

=== Constantine Drakon ===
Constantine Drakon (portrayed by Darren Shahlavi) is the head of Adam Hunt's security and deadly in hand-to-hand combat. He is the first real foe that the Arrow faces after returning home and is killed by an arrow to the chest.

== F ==
=== Esrin Fortuna ===
Esrin Fortuna (portrayed by Gabriella Wright) is an immortal shaman Oliver consults on John Constantine's recommendation to learn about Darhk's powers.

=== Nora Fries ===
Nora Fries (portrayed by Cassandra Jean Amell) is an inmate at Arkham Asylum. Normally held in cryostasis, she is released when John Deegan causes a mass breakout.

=== Max Fuller ===
Max Fuller (portrayed by Marcus Rosner) is the manager of the nightclub Poison. In season one, he bans Oliver Queen, Tommy Merlyn and Laurel Lance from his nightclub for Oliver sleeping with his fiancée in the past. In season seven, once Oliver has been outed as the Green Arrow, Fuller orchestrates the murders of his business partners Sam Hutchinson and Clayton Ford at the hands of Frank Cassaday, trying to frame Oliver. He then sends Cassaday after Oliver, but Oliver beats them both down and has them arrested by the SCPD.

=== Edward Fyers ===
Eddie Fyers (portrayed by Sebastian Dunn) is a mercenary on Lian Yu seen during the season one flashbacks where he serves as the main antagonist. Fyers plans to shoot down a Ferris Air flight and then force Yao Fei into taking responsibility for the attack. While he believes the plan is to destabilize China's economy, it is later revealed that he was hired by Amanda Waller, whose real goal was to kill Chien Na Wei. Fyers' plan is foiled by Shado, Slade Wilson, and Oliver Queen, who kills him with an arrow to the throat. He returns in the season eight episode "Purgatory" where Team Arrow and Lyla Michaels encounter him and his group on Lian Yu when the energy build-up restored them. When Lyla activates the weapon that is tied to her DNA, the energies are absorbed causing Edward and his group disappear.

== G ==
=== Ted Gaynor ===
Ted Gaynor (portrayed by Ben Browder) is Diggle's former military commander who turns rogue and starts robbing cash from truck transfers only to be killed by the Arrow. Gaynor returns in flashbacks where his military history with Diggle is shown.

=== Nyssa al Ghul ===
Nyssa al Ghul (portrayed by Katrina Law) is the daughter of Ra's al Ghul. Nyssa is said to have encountered a dying Sara on Lian Yu after Oliver and Slade's fight on the Amazo, and brought Sara to the League where they became lovers, though her father never approved of their relationship. In season two, when Sara leaves the League, Nyssa works to force her return, threatening her family, but ultimately accepts her departure and later helps Oliver fight Slade's army when Sara decides to return to the League. In season three, when Sara is murdered, Nyssa goes on a vengeance quest to kill Malcolm, correctly assuming he is her killer though he claims otherwise. She befriends Sara's sister, Laurel, but her animosity with Oliver intensifies because he is unwilling to let her execute Malcolm. Nyssa feels betrayed when Raʾs declares Oliver his successor and releases Malcolm, and she leaves Nanda Parbat for Starling City and begins training Laurel. Nyssa is later captured by Oliver, Maseo Yamashiro and a team of assassins to bring her back to Nanda Parbat by force, for stealing the Alpha/Omega virus from the League. Instead of having Oliver kill Nyssa for her betrayal, Raʾs decides that the two should marry, to her evident dismay. However, Nyssa aligns herself with Oliver and his team to save Starling City, defying her father. She later returns to the League under Malcolm's leadership and bows to him despite making it clear that she intends to kill him one day. In season four Nyssa begs Laurel not to use the Lazarus Pit to bring Sara back to life, knowing Sara will return different. When Laurel does so regardlessly, Nyssa retaliates by using a potion Raʾs Al Ghul left to destroy the Pit. Nyssa later escapes and tries to manipulate Oliver into killing Malcolm by leveraging him with the cure to Thea's condition, though this results in war between her and Malcolm. Eventually, Nyssa succeeds when Oliver defeats Malcolm without killing him and Nyssa disbands the League to spite Malcolm and regain Team Arrow's trust. She later returns to attend Laurel's funeral. In season five, Nyssa returns to help Oliver free his friends from Adrian Chase on Lian Yu. She survives Chase's explosion on the island. According to Slade, she went looking for Evelyn Sharpe, who was imprisoned in a cage. In season six, Nyssa helps Team Arrow fight off the Thanatos Guild, assembled by Malcolm before his death on Lian Yu. She departs with Thea Queen and Roy Harper to destroy the three Lazarus Pits that Malcolm discovered. Season seven's flashforwards reveal Nyssa training Oliver and Felicity's daughter Mia Smoak throughout her childhood. Later, in the series finale, it is revealed that the main cause of the estrangement between Nyssa and her father was because of the latter never had accepted his daughter being a lesbian.

=== Ra's al Ghul ===
Ra's al Ghul (Arabic: رأس الغول, lit. 'The Demon's Head'; portrayed by Matt Nable) is the main antagonist of season three and leader of the League of Assassins who has lived for at least two centuries (having been born some decades before 1854) due to the use of the Lazarus Pit, a pool which can heal wounds and bring the dead back to life. He is the father of Nyssa al Ghul. Raʾs has never acknowledged Sara as a member of the League and disapproves of Nyssa's relationship with her. Oliver claims to have killed Sara and challenges Raʾs al Ghul to a trial by combat which Raʾs easily wins, nearly killing Oliver by stabbing him through the chest. Raʾs wants to make Oliver his heir—the new Raʾs al Ghul—because Oliver is the only man to survive a death match against him, fulfilling a League prophecy regarding his destined successor. Raʾs become fixated with Oliver, neglecting other candidates, and becomes estranged with his daughter. When Oliver refuses his offer, Raʾs orders the League to kill the people of Starling City; he stabs Thea and leaves her near death, with a cure via the Lazarus Pit available only if Oliver agrees to become his heir. Oliver accedes, and Raʾs names him "Al Sah-Him". After Oliver captures Nyssa, Raʾs forces an engagement between them. He also orders Oliver to unleash the Alpha/Omega bioweapon on Starling City, oblivious that Oliver was working with Malcolm and Nyssa to take down the League from the inside. In the season finale, Oliver kills Raʾs. Malcolm becomes Raʾs successor of the League's leadership, and thus its prophecy is fulfilled as Malcolm survived an assault by Raʾs during his captivity. Later, in the series finale, it is revealed that Raʾs does not accept Nyssa's homosexuality, considered it abnormal in her life and thus another motive of why he wanted Oliver to be Nyssa's husband was to provide her a male partner.

=== Talia al Ghul ===
Talia al Ghul (portrayed by Lexa Doig) is a worldly and cultured elite warrior. Milli Wilkinson previously portrayed a younger version of the character on Legends of Tomorrow. Talia is Raʾs al Ghul's daughter and Nyssa al Ghul's eldest sister; she trained one of Oliver's mentors, Yao Fei Gulong, before training Oliver herself in Russia. She seeks revenge against Oliver for her father's death by aligning herself with Adrian Chase. Talia is also enemies with Nyssa after the former left their family, and their feud is intensified after knowing Nyssa's role of their father's death. Talia also controls a League of Assassins remnant.

After her fate was unknown following the explosion in Lian Yu, Talia turns up alive as an inmate of Slabside Maximum Security Prison. She resides in Level 2 of the prison under the alias of the "Demon" whom Ricardo Diaz uses to order different attacks on Oliver Queen. After Oliver helps in her escape, Talia drops off the USB involving Jarrett Parker's illegal psychiatric activities on them to Felicity Smoak, which leads to Level 2 getting shut down and Jarrett getting fired. Talia later returns and kills Jarrett as payback for what she has been through. In the final season, Talia sides with Oliver and Thea to uncover the truth about Mar Novu. She ends up betraying the two to restart the League of Assassins. Once Thea beats her in the tomb of Al-Fatih, she joins Thea's new league entitled 'the League of Heroes.' Shortly after The Crisis, Talia along with her sister, Nyssa, she would attend Oliver Queen's funeral.

=== Ted Grant / Wildcat ===
Ted Grant / Wildcat (portrayed by J. R. Ramirez) is a former boxer who runs a gym for underprivileged youth. He provides Laurel with combat training, and in the process becomes Laurel's friend and confidant. He is also a former low-profile vigilante who watched over the Glades.

=== Ishmael Gregor ===
Ishmael Gregor (portrayed by David Meunier) is the Pakhan ("Godfather") of the Bratva (Russian mafia), who takes a special interest in Oliver Queen.

=== Grim Reaper ===
Grim Reaper (portrayed by John DeSantis) is a tough inmate at Slabside Maximum Security Prison.

=== Yao Fei Gulong ===
Yao Fei Gulong (portrayed by Byron Mann) is a skilled former Chinese general who assists Oliver on Lian Yu during season one. Yao Fei was framed for the massacre of a Chinese village by his superiors and exiled to Lian Yu as punishment. He was found there by Edward Fyers who uses Yao Fei's daughter Shado as leverage to extort his help bringing down a commercial airliner. During an escape attempt, Yao Fei encounters Oliver whom he shelters and teaches survival skills to, and brings him to Slade Wilson and Shado to teach him combat and archery, respectively. Yao Fei is killed by Fyers in the season one finale.

In the season five flashbacks, it is revealed that Yao Fei was taught by Talia al Ghul.

In the season eight episode "Purgatory", he returns to life due to an energy build-up on the island. He helps Oliver and his team fight against a restored Fyers and his team. After Lyla Michaels activates the weapon that is tied to her DNA, the energies are absorbed, causing Yao Fei, Fyers, and the other mercenaries to vanish.

The character's name was derived from a DC Comics superhero character.

== H ==
=== Dave Hackett ===
Dave Hackett (portrayed by Ben Cotton) is Robert Queen's bodyguard, who survives the sinking of Queen's Gambit, but is killed on the life raft by Robert to ensure his son Oliver has enough food to survive.

=== Sam Hackett ===
Sam Hackett (portrayed by Luke Camilleri) is the son of Dave Hackett. Learning the truth of his father's death years later, Sam seeks revenge on Oliver but is subdued by the SCPD and arrested.

=== Carter Hall / Hawkman ===
Carter Hall / Hawkman (portrayed by Falk Hentschel) is the latest reincarnation of an Egyptian prince who is fated to reincarnate throughout time along with his soulmate, Kendra Saunders / Hawkgirl. Hentschel stars as the character on Legends of Tomorrow.

=== McKenna Hall ===
McKenna Hall (portrayed by Janina Gavankar) is a vice cop who dates Oliver.

=== Digger Harkness / Captain Boomerang ===
Digger Harkness / Captain Boomerang (portrayed by Nick E. Tarabay) is a former ASIS operative and Suicide Squad member who is highly skilled in martial arts and espionage, whose weapons of choice are custom-made boomerangs. Harkness returns in the season five finale where he is killed by Malcolm Merlyn.

=== Nate Heywood / Steel ===
Nate Heywood / Steel (portrayed by Nick Zano) is a historian-turned-metahuman superhero who can transform himself into a steel-like form. Zano stars as the character on Legends of Tomorrow.

=== Kimberly Hill ===
Kimberly Hill (portrayed by Tina Huang) is a corrupt SCPD officer and ally of Diaz. She took over the duties of being captain following the death of Pike while working with Armand to take down Oliver. Kimberly is fired by Oliver after he discovers her allegiance to Diaz. She is later arrested by Samantha Watson after the F.B.I. obtains evidence of her crimes.

=== Lucas Hilton ===
Detective Lucas Hilton (portrayed by Roger Cross) is Quentin Lance's partner who helps him primarily when he is a detective in season one. He is killed by Cyrus Gold in "Three Ghosts".

=== Paul Holt ===
Paul Holt (portrayed by Chenier Hundal) is the husband of Curtis Holt until their divorce in the fifth season, and Felicity Smoak's physiotherapist.

=== Honor / Silencer ===
Honor / Silencer (portrayed by Miranda Edwards) is a member of the Longbow Hunters. She later gets captured by Wild Dog during a raid on a CDC facility. Thanks to a trick by Smoak, Silencer was released where she secretly has a tracker on her so that Smoak and Black Siren could find Ricardo Diaz. Silencer caught up to Ricardo Diaz in Moscow where Ricardo is holding up Anatoly Knyazev by his shirt.

=== Adam Hunt ===
Adam Hunt (portrayed by Brian Markinson) is a corrupt businessman who is the first person on "The List" stopped by Oliver. He was blackmailed into involvement with the Undertaking. Hunt is later killed by Malcolm Merlyn.

== I ==
=== Anthony Ivo ===
Dr. Anthony Ivo (portrayed by Dylan Neal) is seen during flashbacks in season two where he serves as the main antagonist. Anthony Ivo is the first character in the series who tells Oliver, Slade, and Shado about the "Mirakuru". He later murders Shado. After one of his hands has been cut off by Slade, he is killed by Oliver on Lian Yu.

== J ==
=== Jefferson Jackson / Firestorm ===
Jefferson Jackson / Firestorm (portrayed by Franz Drameh) is a former high school athlete, auto mechanic, and graduate student who succeeds Ronnie Raymond as one half of the hero known as Firestorm with Martin Stein. Drameh reprises his role from The Flash.

=== Cayden James ===
Cayden James (portrayed by Michael Emerson) is the former leader of the hacktivist organization Helix. He initially appears in season five played by an unnamed stunt double before Emerson was cast. In season six, he serves as a red herring before Ricardo Diaz reveals himself as the season's chief antagonist. Once incarcerated by A.R.G.U.S., James is broken out of custody by Helix members with the aid of Felicity Smoak. Later, James reemerges in Star City after rescuing an injured Black Siren from Lian Yu. With Black Siren now under his employment, James and his followers Ricardo Diaz, Vincent Sobel, Anatoly Knyazev, and Sheck are in the process of working on their latest unknown project known as Arclight. It is later revealed that James believes that Oliver as the Green Arrow played a role in the death of James' son Owen. However, Oliver knows that he did not kill Owen James, because he was in Hub City at the time of his death, and after he gets a copy of the fabricated evidence, Oliver suspects that a member in James' cabal framed the Green Arrow for his own schemes. After James surrenders upon seeing Oliver's son, Oliver visits him in the police station, making arrangements to let him visit his son's grave. After Oliver leaves, Ricardo Diaz enters his room with the help of a police captain that is on his side. Before stabbing James to death, Diaz admits he was the one who orchestrated his son's death.

=== J'onn J'onzz / Martian Manhunter ===
J'onn J'onzz (portrayed by David Harewood) is an extraterrestrial superhero who is the last Green Martian and also the director of Department of Extranormal Operations (DEO), residing on Earth-38. Harwood reprises his role from Supergirl.

== K ==
=== Kate Kane / Batwoman ===
Kate Kane / Batwoman (portrayed by Ruby Rose) is the cousin of Bruce Wayne who runs Wayne Enterprises and fights crime as Batwoman after Batman mysteriously left Gotham City. Rose goes on to reprise the role in the spin-off show Batwoman.

=== Clark Kent / Superman ===
Clark Kent / Superman (portrayed by Tyler Hoechlin) is the cousin of Supergirl from Earth-38 and the protector of Metropolis. Hoechlin reprises his role from Supergirl.

=== Anatoly Knyazev ===
Anatoly Knyazev (portrayed by David Nykl) is former KGB agent and Russian mob member. Anatoly was kidnapped by Dr. Ivo and is brought to Lian Yu where he meets Oliver Queen and becomes a friend and is instrumental in Slade's defeat on the island. Sometime between the flashbacks and the present, Anatoly makes Oliver a Bratva captain and continues to assist him in the present.

In season six, he allied with Cayden James and Ricardo Diaz before defecting back to Oliver's side. In season seven, Anatoly helps Team Arrow take down Diaz and Felicity gives him a new identity for him to live his life.

=== Kodiak ===
Kodiak (portrayed by Michael Jonsson), also called "Bear" by his teammates, is a member of the Longbow Hunters. He is later revealed to have assassinated Emiko Queen's mother, Kazumi Adachi, on the orders of Dante.

=== Konstantin Kovar ===
Konstantin Kovar (portrayed by Dolph Lundgren) is a Russian influential General who seeks to gain more power by destroying the criminal organisation Bratva, making him an enemy of Anatoly Knyazev, and serves as the main antagonist in the season five flashbacks, after being alluded to in season four. After infiltrating the Bratva with Anatoly's help, Oliver finally kills Kovar on the island Lian Yu to fulfill Taiana Venediktov's last request, shortly before he is retrieved from the island by a fishing boat arranged by Anatoly (the five-year isolation and rescue story revealed to have been a ruse by Oliver and Anatoly).

Kovar is based on the character of the same name, who is the father of the superhero Red Star.

=== Kullens ===
Kullens (portrayed by Greg Rogers) is a Star City Councilman who is shadowed by Susan Williams. He was later among the politicians on Ricardo Diaz's side. Kullens was among those who were arrested by the FBI. Kullens is killed by Stanley Dover in season seven.

=== Noah Kuttler / Calculator ===
Noah Kuttler / Calculator (portrayed by Tom Amandes) is Felicity's long-lost father, who is a career cyber-criminal whom Donna Smoak divorced from eighteen years previously. He has advanced computer science and hacking skills which surpasses his daughter's, which he uses to blackmail Roy Harper out of hiding. Kuttler is ultimately arrested by Donna's current romantic partner, Quentin Lance, after Felicity turns her father in. After escaping from prison, Kuttler finds himself being targeted by H.I.V.E. due to their awareness that he possibly can thwart their plans for world domination with his computer skills; he helps his daughter in stopping H.I.V.E. after Felicity and her friends save him, but leaves Star City once more at Donna's insistence. He returns in season six to attend Oliver and Felicity's wedding.

In 2040, Felicity operates as the second Calculator to infiltrate Galaxy One/Eden Corps and find out their plans.

== L ==
=== Simon Lacroix / Komodo ===
Simon Lacroix / Komodo (portrayed by Matt Ward) is a mercenary archer who uses the name Komodo and was originally suspected of killing Sara Lance / Canary.

=== Sara Lance / Canary / White Canary ===
Sara Lance / Canary / White Canary (portrayed by Jacqueline MacInnes Wood in the pilot, and Caity Lotz afterwards) is Laurel's sister with whom Oliver had an affair. Sara, along with Laurel and their mother Dinah, is based on the DC Comics superheroine Black Canary. She was believed to have drowned with the sinking Queen's Gambit, but she resurfaces in season two as another vigilante, the "Canary", who is connected to the League of Assassins.

She was originally according to Kreisberg, "the beginning of the Black Canary story".

Canary eventually wins her freedom from the League and returns to Starling City, to become part of Oliver's team in addition to working as a bartender at his nightclub. She breaks with Oliver over a dispute concerning Roy, and rejoins the League in order win their backing against Slade Wilson's army. She returns to Starling City on a mission for the League, but is killed by a mysterious archer. It is revealed that Thea killed Sara while drugged and controlled by Malcolm, as part of a plot to force Oliver into combat with Raʾs al Ghul. Lotz dubs Cassidy's lines when Laurel impersonates Sara as the Canary, and later appears as a hallucination of Laurel's. In season four, Laurel, Thea, and Malcolm resurrect Sara using the Lazarus Pit, but she returns mentally fractured until Oliver brings in his old friend John Constantine to help restore her soul. However, Sara's behavior remains volatile and she suffers an insatiable bloodlust, which prompts her to seek solitude away from home.

In season six, Sara is informed about what happened to Quentin during the fight with Ricardo Diaz.

In season seven, Felicity alerts Sara of Earth-2 Laurel's activities and brings her to 2019 to help her bring Laurel back.

=== Lois Lane ===
Lois Lane (portrayed by Elizabeth Tulloch) is a reporter at the Daily Planet on Earth-38 and wife of Superman.

=== Brie Larvan ===
Brie Larvan (portrayed by Emily Kinney) is a narcissistic technical genius and killer who becomes a rival to Felicity Smoak. Kinney reprises her role from The Flash.

=== Floyd Lawton / Deadshot ===
Floyd Lawton / Deadshot (portrayed by Michael Rowe) is a mercenary who killed Andy Diggle under H.I.V.E.'s orders. Lawton is also a member of the Suicide Squad, although he is killed on a mission in season three. In season four, it is revealed that Lawton did not kill Andy. Instead, he was used by H.I.V.E. to fake Andy's death.

=== Alexi Leonov ===
Alexi Leonov (portrayed by Eugene Lipinski) is a Russian Bratva member. He is killed by Slade Wilson in season two.

=== Lopez ===
Lopez (portrayed by Alison Araya) is a Star City police officer who later sided with Ricardo Diaz. She was later arrested by the FBI.

=== Jean Loring ===
Jean Loring (portrayed by Teryl Rothery) is Moira's attorney for her murder trial. She later represents Oliver Queen when he is suspected to be Green Arrow due to the machinations of Ricardo Diaz.

=== Lex Luthor ===
Lex Luthor (portrayed by Jon Cryer) is an enemy of Superman and Supergirl's from Earth-38 that the Monitor recruits to avert the Crisis. Cryer reprises his role from Supergirl.

=== Garfield Lynns ===
Garfield Lynns (portrayed by Andrew Dunbar) is a former firefighter who is killing other firefighters as revenge for being abandoned in a fire. Before committing suicide, Lynns reveals to the Hood that he is scared of living.

== M ==
=== Lonnie Machin / Anarky ===
Lonnie Machin / Anarky (portrayed by Alexander Calvert) is a deranged freelancing criminal who is willing to do whatever it takes to impress a potential employer. After his face was disfigured and burned by Thea, he becomes a rogue terrorist and plans on getting his revenge on Darhk for betraying him. In season 5, he is taken down by the Green Arrow.

=== Billy Malone ===
Detective Billy Malone (portrayed by Tyler Ritter) is a new member of the Star City Police Department and Felicity's new boyfriend. He is inadvertently killed by Oliver due to a trap set by Prometheus.

=== Barton Mathis / Dollmaker ===
Barton Mathis / Dollmaker (portrayed by Michael Eklund) is a misogynistic serial killer and an enemy of Quentin Lance, later killed by Sara Lance.

=== Mari McCabe / Vixen ===
Mari McCabe / Vixen (portrayed by Megalyn Echikunwoke) was born in Africa and orphaned at a young age, and later raised in the United States. Mari inherits her family's mystical Tantu Totem, which allows her to access the powers of the animal kingdom, and becomes a Detroit-based superpowered vigilante. Mari is a friend and ally to both Oliver and Barry Allen. Echikunwoke reprises her role from the animated Arrowverse series Vixen.

=== C. McGarvey ===
C. McGarvey (portrayed by Gaalen Engen) is a corrupt judge in Star City. When it came to the trial of Oliver Queen, he got knocked out by John Diggle and Rene Ramirez so that Christopher Chance can pose as him to get Oliver Queen to seek probation before being free to go. When Ricardo Diaz had C. McGarvey brought to him over what happened at the trial, he tries to explain what really happened only for an angry Diaz to shoot him dead.

=== Aviva Metula / Shadow Thief ===
Aviva Metula / Shadow Thief (portrayed by Carmel Amit) is a former Mossad agent turned thief who partners up with Laurel Lance after she is outed as Black Siren. The two were introduced to one another by Ricardo Diaz. After Lance turns on her, Shadow Thief manages to escape.

=== Lyla Michaels / Harbinger ===
Lyla Michaels (portrayed by Audrey Marie Anderson) is an A.R.G.U.S. agent and John Diggle's wife who served with him in Afghanistan where they first met. Within A.R.G.U.S. she uses the codename "Harbinger" and is the field leader of the Suicide Squad. Lyla and John also have a child, born in season three, who they name Sara in honor of Sara Lance (The child is later changed to a son named John Jr. following the events of "Flashpoint"). Lyla and Sara are kidnapped by Oliver when he masquerades as a devoted League of Assassins member called Al Sah-Him. Though this strains the friendship between John and Oliver when the truth comes out, Lyla understands that it was necessary in his battle to destroy Raʾs al Ghul and the League. In season four, after Amanda Waller's death, Lyla becomes her successor as leader of A.R.G.U.S. and works to reform the organization. While she primarily aids Team Arrow, Lyla occasionally makes appearances in The Flash to aid Team Flash when A.R.G.U.S. faces metahuman threats. However, Lyla along with her husband learns of the alteration of her life due to the events of The Flash episode "Flashpoint", leading her to distrust the Flash. In the final season, Lyla is revealed to be working with Mar Novu / The Monitor. She later transforms into a new being and brands herself a "harbinger of things to come".

=== James Midas ===
James Midas (portrayed by Andrew Kavadas) is the CEO of Midas Medical, who is manufacturing and selling poison bullets. He is the first criminal arrested by the deputized Team Arrow.

== O ==
=== Alexa Van Owen ===
Alexa Van Owen (portrayed by Catherine Dent) is an outside counsel who once convicted the organization Intergang. She prosecutes Oliver Queen at his trial where Christopher Chance posing as Judge McGarvey during the verdict had heard the guilty verdict and told Oliver to seek probation before he is free to go.

== P ==
=== Ray Palmer / Atom ===
Ray Palmer / Atom (portrayed by Brandon Routh) is a scientist, inventor, minister and businessman who succeeds Isabel Rochev as CEO of Queen Consolidated after her crimes are posthumously exposed. Ray seeks to make improvements to Starling City after it survived terrorist attacks, and has the intention of renaming it "Star City", involving himself with the city's legislative body. After his fiancée, Anna Loring, is killed by one of Slade Wilson's Mirakuru soldiers, Ray uses the company's research and technical inventions to develop a suit powered by white dwarf matter, which, in his theory, can alter the wearer's size down to the subatomic level. Ray seeks to use it to become a high-tech vigilante, named "Atom". He renames Queen Consolidated "Palmer Technologies" and makes Felicity his vice president. Ray and Felicity become lovers until Ray realizes that she is in love with Oliver. Ray assists Team Arrow's fight against Raʾs al Ghul to stop him unleashing the Alpha/Omega bioweapon. In the season finale Ray is working on the suit with the intention of giving it the power to shrink but a malfunction causes the entire top floor of Palmer Technologies to blow up. It is revealed later that Ray is alive but was being held captive by Darhk until he is freed by Team Arrow to join their fight against H.I.V.E.

=== Jarrett Parker ===
Jarrett Parker (portrayed by Jason E. Kelley) is the chief psychiatrist at Slabside Maximum Security Prison who uses a special brain machine and a truth serum when doing his therapy on the inmates of the prison's Level 2. Thanks to Oliver Queen, Talia al Ghul escapes from Slabside and drops off a USB to Felicity Smoak which exposes Jarrett's illegal psychiatry activities. This leads to Jarrett getting fired and Level 2 of the prison being shut down. As he is loading his stuff into his car, Talia returns and kills him as payback for what he did to her.

=== P. Parks ===
P. Parks (portrayed by Josh Byer) is a Star City police officer who is among the police officers on Ricardo Diaz's side. When the FBI and Team Arrow raid the Star City Police Department, Parks is defeated by Green Arrow and Black Canary and arrested by the by FBI.

=== Frank Pike ===
Frank Pike (portrayed by Adrian Holmes) is a police lieutenant and Quentin Lance's superior. By the fifth season, Pike has been promoted to captain of police. He dies in season six during an attack caused by Cayden James.

=== Emily Pollard ===
Emily Pollard (portrayed by Laara Sadiq) is a councilwoman with a fierce anti-vigilante stance who pushes a bill with that agenda. She is at one point saved by Team Arrow, which doesn't changes her views at all. When Oliver Queen is impeached as mayor and later arrested as well as his successor Quentin Lance dying during surgery following the fight against Ricardo Diaz, Pollard takes his place and implements her measures with a firm hand. However, by the end of the year, her formerly-high popularity has started to wane in light of increased crime and the emergence of a mysterious new Green Arrow. After Oliver Queen is released from Slabside Maximum Security Prison and assists Dinah Drake in apprehending Max Fuller, Pollard visits the Star City Police Department disapproving of Oliver breaking the anti-vigilante law. Dinah states that Oliver is now working with the Star City Police Department. As Mayor Pollard leaves with plans to get the district attorney to take action, Dinah comments that the current district attorney is on her side. Pollard also deputised Curtis Holt, Rene Ramirez and John Diggle.

== Q ==
=== Robert Queen ===
Robert Queen (portrayed by Jamey Sheridan) is Moira's late husband, Oliver and Emiko's father, Thea's legal father, William Clayton and Mia Smoak's paternal grandfather, and Felicity Smoak's father-in-law. Despite his marriage to Moira, Robert was not a faithful husband, having many illicit affairs outside of his marriage including with his company's intern, Isabel Rochev, and a Japanese-descent woman, Kazumi Adachi. In addition, he has a secret daughter, Emiko, with Adachi. Robert is secretly aware that Thea is Malcolm Merlyn's biological daughter, but accepted her and also acted as a surrogate father to Malcolm's son, Tommy. As a young man, Robert gained his wealth through corrupted means; he gradually become remorseful of his greed, leading him to join Malcolm's secret society, Tempest, to improve Starling City's condition in hope of making amends. He also accidentally killed a local councilman, Henry Goodwin, when the latter seeks bribes from Robert, which traumatizes him and hates himself of becoming a killer. He and Oliver were both lost at sea when Malcolm sabotaged the Queen's Gambit. Robert admits to his son of being corrupt and is guilt-ridden by it, and was working to atone his misdeeds. He sacrifices his life by killing himself, increasing Oliver's chances of survival and returning home to Starling City to right Robert's wrongs.

== R ==
=== Raisa ===
Raisa (portrayed by Kathleen Gati) is a long-serving domestic worker in the Queen mansion when the series begins; she has been close to Oliver since his childhood. She returns in season six to help take care of William, Oliver's son.

=== Zoe Ramirez ===
Zoe Ramirez (portrayed by Eliza Faria as a teenager, Andrea Sixtos as an adult) is the daughter of Rene Ramirez. Rene does not have legal custody of Zoe at first, but later Zoe starts living with her father full-time. She later learned about her father's vigilante life, and becomes supportive of his heroic endeavors because of their shared hatred towards the crime wave plaguing their home and took her mother's life.

In season six, Zoe bonds with her father's vigilante associates, and sees Dinah Drake as a surrogate mother.

In the season seven flash-forwards, it is revealed that Zoe has followed in her father's footsteps and became Dinah Drake's protégée, being a member of female vigilante group the Canaries, while in her civilian identity, moonlights as a member of her father's staff (who is the Glades' elected mayor). At the end of the season, Zoe becomes the leader of the Canaries, when Dinah leaves Star City to live as a fugitive. In season 8, she is stabbed by John Diggle Jr. when fighting alongside Mia Smoak. Following the Crisis, Zoe is alive after the timeline has changed. She still works for her father, but did not become a vigilante.

=== Cisco Ramon / Vibe ===
Francisco "Cisco" Ramon / Vibe (portrayed by Carlos Valdes) is a mechanical engineering genius at S.T.A.R. Labs with known metahuman abilities to detect anomalies within reality and sonic manipulation. Cisco helps upgrade the arsenals of Oliver, Laurel, and Sara, aids Ray with his Atom suit, and designs a new safe house for Oliver. Valdes stars as the character on The Flash.

=== Red Dart ===
Red Dart (portrayed by Holly Elissa Dignard) is a member of the Longbow Hunters.

=== Rory Regan / Ragman ===
Rory Regan / Ragman (portrayed by Joe Dinicol) arrives "fresh from a personal tragedy" hoping to find answers in Star City, where he ultimately crosses paths with Green Arrow. Regan is the only survivor of the nuclear destruction of Havenrock and wears ancient magical rags as the vigilante Ragman. Oliver eventually manages to convince him to join Team Arrow as part of the new recruits. He leaves the team when his rags lose their powers after being used to shield a nuclear explosion. Later, his mask appears in Chimera's personal collection, leaving his fate unknown. After the crisis, Regan helps Team Arrow find William.

=== Baron Reiter ===
Baron Reiter (portrayed by Jimmy Akingbola) is the leader of Shadowspire in the season four's flashbacks, when he was searching for magical artifacts on Lian Yu, specifically the idol that Damien Darhk later possesses. He is eventually killed by Oliver when Taiana gains control of the idol's powers and weaken him long enough for Oliver to hurl a knife into Reiter's back, killing him.

=== Derek Reston / King ===
Derek Reston / King (portrayed by Currie Graham) is the leader of a gang consisting of his family members.

=== Kyle Reston / Ace ===
Kyle Reston / Ace (portrayed by Kyle Schmid) is the son of Derek Reston and a member of the Reston crime family.

=== Isabel Rochev ===
Isabel Rochev (portrayed by Summer Glau) is a senior executive at Stellmoor International who acquires half of Queen Consolidated in the second-season premiere. She later secures full control of the company in a hostile takeover. It is revealed she was Oliver's father's mistress during her internship and had been working with Slade to get revenge. Like Oliver, Isabel was also trained by Slade in martial arts, but she later had a blood transfusion from Slade which contains with the Mirakuru drug that empowered him. In the season two finale Isabel is killed by Nyssa al Ghul. The character shares her name with the DC Comics villain "The Queen", who, in the comics, became CEO of Queen Industries following the death of founder Robert Queen.

=== Mick Rory / Heat Wave ===
Mick Rory / Heat Wave (portrayed by Dominic Purcell) is an arsonist, career criminal, and accomplice of Leonard Snart who, in contrast to his partner, uses a heat gun capable of burning almost anything. Purcell reprises his role from The Flash.

== S ==
=== Nick Salvati ===
Nick Salvati (portrayed by Tahmoh Penikett) is the right-hand man of Frank Bertinelli.

=== Derek Sampson ===
Derek Sampson (portrayed by Cody Runnels) is a drug dealer terrorizing Star City. He is exposed to a chemical compound called "Stardust", which makes him unable to feel pain.

In season seven, he appears as an inmate at Slabside Maximum Security Prison. When Ricardo Diaz takes control of the prison, Derek assists him in attacking Oliver. When Diaz starts an electrical fire, Sampson is set on fire by Ben Turner.

=== Kendra Saunders / Hawkgirl ===
Kendra Saunders / Hawkgirl (portrayed by Ciara Renée) is a young woman who is just beginning to learn that she has been repeatedly reincarnated over the centuries. When provoked, her ancient warrior persona manifests itself, along with wings that grow out of her back, earning her the name Hawkgirl. Renée stars as the character on Legends of Tomorrow.

=== Vandal Savage ===
Vandal Savage (portrayed by Casper Crump) is a 4,000-year-old immortal, who has manipulated leaders throughout history in an attempt to gain dominion over the entire world. He becomes a main antagonist in the first season of Legends of Tomorrow.

=== Mark Scheffer / Shrapnel ===
Mark Scheffer / Shrapnel (portrayed by Sean Maher) is a former toy-shop owner who becomes a psychotic serial bomber and later a member of the Suicide Squad. He was killed during the first mission.

=== Elisa Schwartz ===
Elisa Schwartz (portrayed by Venus Terzo) is a Star City General Hospital doctor who often treats several Team Arrow members. She is very aware of Green Arrow's identity when she treated a dying Laurel.

=== Cooper Seldon ===
Cooper Seldon (portrayed by Nolan Funk) is Felicity's boyfriend during her time at MIT, and leader of the hacktivist-turned-terrorist organization "Brother Eye". He escapes in Darhk's prison riot and joins H.I.V.E. as their hacker.

=== Shado ===
Shado (portrayed by Celina Jade) is the daughter of Yao Fei. She helps train Oliver in archery and martial arts while on Lian Yu in the season one flashbacks; they eventually become lovers during the season two flashbacks. She is killed by Ivo causing Slade, who had secretly been in love with her, to blame Oliver for her death and vows revenge. She later appears in Slade's hallucinations in the present time. Jade also portrayed Shado's twin sister, Mei, who Oliver meets in Hong Kong during a season three flashback. She also appears as a hallucination in season four during Oliver's second stay on Lian Yu.

=== Evelyn Sharp / Artemis ===
Evelyn Crawford Sharp (portrayed by Madison McLaughlin) is a woman who takes up the mantle of the Black Canary following Laurel's death, eventually settling on the name Artemis. After imitating Black Canary, she ran afoul of Arrow after threatening revenge on Damien Darhk. She becomes one of the new recruits of Team Arrow despite her moral ambiguity and hatred for H.I.V.E., but ultimately betrays the team to Prometheus after learning about the List and Oliver's former identity as the Arrow. She is on Lian Yu when it was blown up by Prometheus, with her fate never revealed.

=== Mark Shaw ===
Mark Shaw (portrayed by David Cubitt) is the liaison A.R.G.U.S. agent to Corto Maltese, who has gone off the grid and is unreachable. Lyla Michaels asks John Diggle to check-up on Shaw while he visits the island. Diggle finds Shaw who is in the midst of a critical undercover mission with a local cartel and offers him to help. Soon after, Shaw betrays him and steals an A.R.G.U.S. thumbdrive. Oliver Queen, Roy Harper and Diggle ambush the trade between Shaw and the cartel. After Diggle defeats him, Shaw claims Amanda Waller drove him to his insubordination. Shaw begged Diggle to tell Waller he killed Shaw so Shaw can go back to living a normal life. Diggle, knowing full well what Waller was capable of, knocked him out but agreed to do so. In "Al Sah-him", it is revealed that he became ally to H.I.V.E. and, under the orders from Damien Darhk, went to Corto Maltese to draw A.R.G.U.S. agents and obtain secret files.

=== Sheck ===
Sheck (portrayed by Tobias Jelinek) is the right-hand man of Cayden James and a member of his secret cabal. He is responsible for saving Black Siren following the detonation of Lian Yu, ensuring her loyalty to his boss's cause. Scheck is later killed by Vigilante, revealing the latter's nature as a mole in the group.

=== Matthew Shrieve ===
Matthew Shrieve (portrayed by Marc Singer) is a US Army General who is introduced in a flashback at the end of the episode "The Return". He serves as a main antagonist of the third season flashbacks. Shrieve presents himself as a more reasonable counterpart to Amanda Waller, allowing Oliver and the Yamashiros to go free after their mission in Hong Kong is completed; he is later revealed to be the one who ordered their deaths, betraying and framing Waller as he plots to use the virus they acquired to cripple China, which he sees as a growing threat to America. Shrieve is also responsible for causing Akio's death and in vengeance he is brutally tortured by Oliver before being executed by Maseo.

=== Jake Simmons / Deathbolt ===
Jake Simmons / Deathbolt (portrayed by Doug Jones) is a metahuman from Opal City who receives his powers through unknown means, with the ability to harness and weaponize plasma energy.

=== Cindy "Sin" Simone ===
Cindy "Sin" Simone (portrayed by Bex Taylor-Klaus) is a wayward youth whom Sara takes under her protection in Starling City after Cindy's father is killed on Lian Yu. Cindy later befriends Roy Harper and Thea Queen.

=== David Singh ===
David Singh (portrayed by Patrick Sabongui) is the Central City Police Captain who provided the Green Arrow and his team with information that lead to the location of Dinah Drake. Sabongui reprises his role from The Flash.

=== Donna Smoak ===
Donna Smoak (portrayed by Charlotte Ross), a former cocktail waitress from Las Vegas, is Felicity's mother and Mia Smoak's maternal grandmother. Donna was previously married to cyber-criminal Noah Kuttler which led to Felicity's conception prior to leaving him; Donna claimed that Noah abandoned them, resulting in an estranged relationship with Felicity until they reconcile seventeen years later. Donna meets and dates Quentin Lance, but remains bitter over Noah and his criminal past. She helps Quentin to cope with the loss of his eldest daughter, Laurel. As of the season five premiere, Donna and Quentin have split up. Donna and Quentin eventually end up getting married in the season seven finale, we later find out she gets pregnant and gives birth to Felicity's younger brother Noah Lance.

=== Caitlin Snow / Killer Frost ===
Caitlin Snow / Killer Frost (portrayed by Danielle Panabaker) is a bio-engineering expert from S.T.A.R. Labs and a metahuman with cryokinetic abilities. Caitlin helps Felicity in recreating the Mirakuru antidote, and occasionally helps Team Arrow on missions. Panabaker stars as the character on The Flash.

=== Vincent Sobel / Vigilante ===
Vincent "Vinnie" Sobel / Vigilante (portrayed by Johann Urb, voiced by Mick Wingert when masked) is a crimefighter who kills criminals.

He is revealed to be a member of Cayden James' criminal cabal, but is working as a double agent who informs Team Arrow of their activities, primarily because of his love for Dinah. Vincent is eventually caught and killed by Black Siren for his betrayal.

Despite belief that Josh Segarra voiced the character, thus implying that Adrian Chase was also Vigilante (as is the case in the comics), it was revealed that his character was instead Prometheus. As such, Guggenheim indicated that the reveal of who Vigilante actually was would "probably" not be seen in season five and that Vigilante's identity was someone already seen before. Sobel was originally portrayed by Clayton Chitty in the fifth season.

=== Sean Sonus ===
Sean Sonus (portrayed by Steve Bacic) is a drug dealer who killed Central City Police Department officer Vincent Sobel during the S.T.A.R. Labs particle accelerator incident in season two of Arrow and got powers as a metahuman to further his criminal enterprise. Sean is hunted across the country by Dinah Drake until they meet again in Hub City.

=== Kate Spencer ===
Kate Spencer (portrayed by Chelah Horsdal) is a district attorney. She is killed in season two during Slade Wilson's rampage on Starling City.

=== Walter Steele ===
Walter Steele (portrayed by Colin Salmon) is Moira's husband, Oliver and Thea's step-father, and Felicity's former employer. He was president of Queen Consolidated until he disappeared in episode 9, but was found alive in episode 21. He and Moira separate at the end of season one, and he returns in season two to help her run for mayor. It is revealed that Moira had confided in Walter about Thea's true paternity at some point after they marry. He is currently the chief financial officer of Starling National Bank.

=== Martin Stein / Firestorm ===
Martin Stein / Firestorm (portrayed by Victor Garber) is a nuclear physicist focused on transmutation who is second half of the hero known as Firestorm with Jefferson Jackson. Garber reprises his role from The Flash.

=== Jason Stent ===
Jason Stent (portrayed by Chris Milligan) is a weapons dealer who was defeated by Emiko Queen when Oliver Queen is incarcerated at Slabside Maximum Security Prison.

=== Roy Stewart ===
General Roy Stewart (portrayed by Ernie Hudson) is John Diggle's step-father and a former U.S. Marine Corps lieutenant, who works in the Defense Intelligence Agency. He is introduced in Arrow's seventh season, in the episode "Spartan". He and Diggle have a strained relationship caused by Diggle's belief that Stewart abandoned his father during an operation, which led to his death, as well as the rigorous marine training he put the Diggle brothers through after marrying their mother. Actually, Diggle's father's death was caused by his own negligence and Stewart saved the rest of the unit, but Stewart has not corrected Diggle's view of the situation, wanting him to see his father as a hero. When Diggle learns what really happened, he and Stewart make amends.

== T ==
=== Jeremy Tell / Double Down ===
Jeremy Tell / Double Down (portrayed by JR Bourne) is a metahuman who can turn his playing card tattoos into weapons.

=== Eobard Thawne / Reverse Flash ===
Eobard Thawne / Reverse Flash (portrayed by Tom Cavanagh) is an enemy of Flash who impersonates Harrison Wells.

=== William Tockman / Clock King ===
William Tockman / Clock King (portrayed by Robert Knepper) is a criminal mastermind.

=== Ben Turner / Bronze Tiger ===
Ben Turner / Bronze Tiger (portrayed by Michael Jai White) is an assassin who uses metal claws as weapons and subsequently becomes a member of the Suicide Squad.

While it was said that he died during a Suicide Squad mission in the comics, Bronze Tiger turns up alive in season seven as an inmate at Slabside Maximum Security Prison. Stanley Dover frames him for stabbing an inmate causing Bronze Tiger to be placed in solitary confinement. When Ricardo Diaz takes control of the prison, Bronze Tiger assists Oliver Queen in fighting the inmates. As Oliver heads out to fight Diaz, Bronze Tiger leads the guards and prisoners to the secure prison yard. After Diaz is defeated and control over the prison is reclaimed, Bronze Tiger returns to his cell to find The Count of Monte Cristo in his cell as a guard thanks him for his assistance. In the season finale, Turner, having been released from Slabside, helps Team Arrow battle the Ninth Circle.

== V ==
=== Joanna De La Vega ===
Joanna De La Vega (portrayed by Annie Ilonzeh) is Laurel's friend and co-worker at legal aid firm CNRI.

=== Galina Venediktov ===
Galina Venediktov (portrayed by Natalia Vasiluk), the mother of Taiana Venediktov and Vlad Venediktov. She works as a maid for Konstantin Kovar, believing that he is looking for her children. When Oliver Queen arrives in Russia and exposes Kovar, revealing to Galina that her children are dead, she gives him a key card to Kovar's casino. When Kovar learns of this, he kills Galina.

=== Taiana Venediktov ===
Taiana Venediktov (portrayed by Elysia Rotaru), the daughter of Galina Venediktov and the sister of Vlad Venediktov. She is a woman whose life Oliver saves in the flashbacks, faking her death to protect her from Shadowspire. Oliver kills her brother, who Conklin had sent to attack him, and initially tries to hide it from Taiana. After they get caught by Conklin, Oliver is tortured, and they are both imprisoned. While Taiana is taking care of his wounds—and after Shado appears in his dreams, telling Oliver to do the right thing—he confesses. She later helps Oliver escape as they manage to steal the idol from Reiter, but the idol's power begins to corrupt Taiana. Realizing she cannot control it, she asks Oliver to kill her, and he does.

=== Virgil ===
Virgil (portrayed by Christopher Gerard) is a member of the Ninth Circle, who works as an intermediary for Dante. Following Dante's death, Virgil appears to take over his role as Emiko Queen's second-in-command until turning on her in the season seven finale.

== W ==
=== Amanda Waller ===
Amanda Waller (portrayed by Cynthia Addai-Robinson) is the leader of A.R.G.U.S. and commander of the Suicide Squad. In season two, Waller often forces John Diggle to work for her on missions other A.R.G.U.S. agents are unwilling to perform. She tries to have Starling City destroyed during Slade Wilson's attack to contain the Mirakuru soldiers, only to be stopped by John and Lyla. She has used the codename "Mockingbird". She is killed after the Shadowspire soldiers infiltrate A.R.G.U.S. in season four.

In the season three flashbacks, she rescues Oliver from Lian Yu after witnessing his progressive skills in combat and forces him to work for her and, in the process, furthers his training two years prior to his return to Starling City.

=== Samanda Watson ===
Samanda Watson (portrayed by Sydelle Noel) is an FBI agent investigating the vigilantes of Star City. Watson first arrives in Star City after a leaked photo of Oliver Queen as Green Arrow is exposed to the media. Although the photo was proven to be a fake, Watson remains suspicious of Oliver and chooses to stay behind in Star City to look further into Team Arrow as a whole. Eventually, Oliver comes clean to Samanda about it when he and the FBI work together to apprehend those involved with Ricardo's plot. Oliver agreed to turn himself over to her in exchange that the rest of Team Arrow is spared.

In season seven, Felicity approaches Samanda where she states that Ricardo Diaz has resurfaced and asks for the FBI's help in bringing down Diaz. She was reluctant at first until the Longbow Hunters attacked a CDC facility. After Red Dart and Kodiak get away while Silencer is secretly apprehended by Wild Dog, Samanda is reassigned to desk duty in Washington DC.

=== Chien Na Wei / China White ===
Chien Na Wei / China White (portrayed by Kelly Hu) is a Chinese Triad leader who has a grudge against Arrow for defeating her in combat during their first encounter. However, Oliver actually met her in Hong Kong two years prior, shown during the season three flashbacks. He helps capture her when she comes to Starling City. In season five, she escaped from prison with Carrie Cutter and Liza Warner but is later recaptured by Green Arrow and his team. She was briefly a member of "Ghost Initiative" in season 7 when A.R.G.U.S attempted to catch a terrorist financier Dante. In season 8, she got out of A.R.G.U.S and is working for the Chinese triad. She and her goons attempt to get Dr. Robert Wong and his recreated project Alpha/Omega virus. During the battle between her and Tatsu Yamashiro / Katana, the former attempts to kill her, but is thrown in the water by Laurel Lance of Earth-2 when using sonic scream.

=== Alena Whitlock ===
Alena Whitlock (portrayed by Kacey Rohl) also known as Kojo Sledgehammer, is a member of the Helix hacking organization who attempts to recruit Felicity to their ranks after helping her clear Diggle's name. She later allies with Team Arrow after Cayden James is driven insane by the loss of his son, and works with Felicity in battling James' cabal. In season seven, Felicity hires her as chief technology officer of Smoak Technologies. Alena is revealed to be responsible for Star City's dire situation in the 2040 flashforwards as she stole Felicity's Archer security program and sold it to Galaxy One.

=== Joe Wilson ===
Joe Wilson (portrayed by Liam Hall), also known as Kane Wolfman, is the son of Slade Wilson and a former ASIS operative. He is the leader of a Russian gang known as the Jackals, which specializes in the collection of powerful weapons.

=== Billy Wintergreen / Deathstroke ===
Billy Wintergreen (portrayed by Jeffrey Robinson) is Slade Wilson's partner in the ASIS, who betrays him and joins Fyers. He is later killed by Slade in the first-season finale. He returns in the season eight episode "Purgatory" where Team Arrow and Lyla Michaels encounter Wintergreen, Fyers and his group on Lian Yu when the energy build-up restored them. When Lyla activates the weapon that is tied to her DNA, the energies are absorbed, causing Wintergreen, Fyers and his group to disappear.

== Y ==
=== Maseo Yamashiro ===
Maseo Yamashiro (portrayed by Karl Yune) was Oliver's handler and later good friend during his time in Hong Kong. He becomes estranged from his wife, Tatsu Yamashiro, after the death of their son, Akio, and joins the League of Assassins as "Sarab". However he remains loyal to Oliver and covertly ensures his survival after his duel with Raʾs al Ghul, and still loves Tatsu. Despite this he is loyal to Raʾs and becomes a key leader in the League's mission to force Oliver to take Raʾs place, going as far as to kill the Starling City mayor to frame him. He is eventually killed by Tatsu after a sword-fight, finally relieved from the agony of his son's death.

=== Tatsu Yamashiro ===
Tatsu Yamashiro (portrayed by Rila Fukushima) is a mentor to Oliver during his time in Hong Kong. Devon Aoki was originally cast in the role, but left due to a scheduling conflict. She is the wife of Maseo Yamashiro. In the present day, she is estranged from her husband after the death of their son and she joins the Crescent Order after returning to Japan. She nurses Oliver back to health after he is nearly killed by Raʾs al Ghul. Tatsu supports Team Arrow during their war with the League of Assassins. She kills her husband in a short sword fight and mourns him. She later helps Nyssa and Oliver in curing Thea from the effects of the Lazarus Pit.
