= Doppelganger (Arrow) =

- Arrow episode
- Episode no.: Season 6 Episode 15
- Directed by: Kristin Windell
- Story by: Christos Gage; Ruth Fletcher Gage
- Teleplay by: Speed Weed
- Cinematography by: Gordon Verheul
- Editing by: Patrick Brian
- Original air date: March 8, 2018

Guest appearances
- Colton Haynes as Roy Harper (special guest star); Kirk Acevedo as Ricardo Diaz (special guest star); David Nykl as Anatoly Knyazev; Pej Vahdat as Sam Armand; Tina Huang as Kimberly Hill; Teryl Rothery as Jean Loring; Venus Terzo as Dr. Elisa Schwartz

Episode chronology
| ← Previous "Collision Course" | Next → "The Thanatos Guild" |
- Arrow season 6

"Doppelganger" is the fifteenth episode of the sixth season, and 130th episode overall of The CW series Arrow. The episode sees the return of former main character Roy Harper (Colton Haynes). It also sees the return of Thea donning her Speedy suit since the ninth episode of the fifth season. The episode stars Stephen Amell (Oliver Queen) who is joined by fellow main cast members David Ramsey (John Diggle), Emily Bett Rickards (Felicity Smoak), Katie Cassidy (Laurel Lance), Paul Blackthorne (Quentin Lance), Willa Holland (Thea Queen), Echo Kellum (Curtis Holt) and Juliana Harkavy (Dinah Drake). Main cast member Rick Gonzalez (Rene Ramirez) is also credited but does not appear in this episode.

== Synopsis ==
The episode starts with Jean Loring, Oliver's solicitor in his impending trial coming to him hopeful that she could get the charges against him dropped due to Rene's testimony being illegally obtained. Quentin then walks in to inform Oliver that Laurel Lance / Black Siren from Earth-2 is posing as Earth-1's deceased Laurel Lance much to the disbelief of Oliver and Thea. Oliver, Thea and Quentin go to the Star City Police Department in the hope to stop Laurel from speaking to the press but they are too late. Meanwhile, Curtis visits Rene's daughter Zoe to explain to her what happened to her father. In a meeting with the Star City district attorney, he reveals to Jean and Oliver that they are no longer using Rene's testimony and instead using Roy Harper's. After learning that Roy is the witness, Felicity Smoak and John Diggle discuss the situation with Thea and Oliver. After Laurel is taken from the hospital Dinah and Quentin find that there is corrupt officers in the police department who takes her to Anatoly Kynazev. Oliver and Diggle fight about Oliver being the Green Arrow again. Thea decides to go back out to the field to save Roy, she successfully gets into the hotel room where Roy is being held and kisses him after watching him get tortured. When SWAT shows up to the hotel, Oliver pulls Thea out to save Roy later. Dinah and Quentin are tasked to find the corrupt police officers in the department. When Laurel tells them that Diaz has Roy and where he is, Oliver, Thea and Diggle get ready to go after him. Dinah offers to join them, but Oliver declines her offer due to trust issues. After Roy is rescued, he and Thea go to bed and they were being watched by an unknown person.

== Production ==
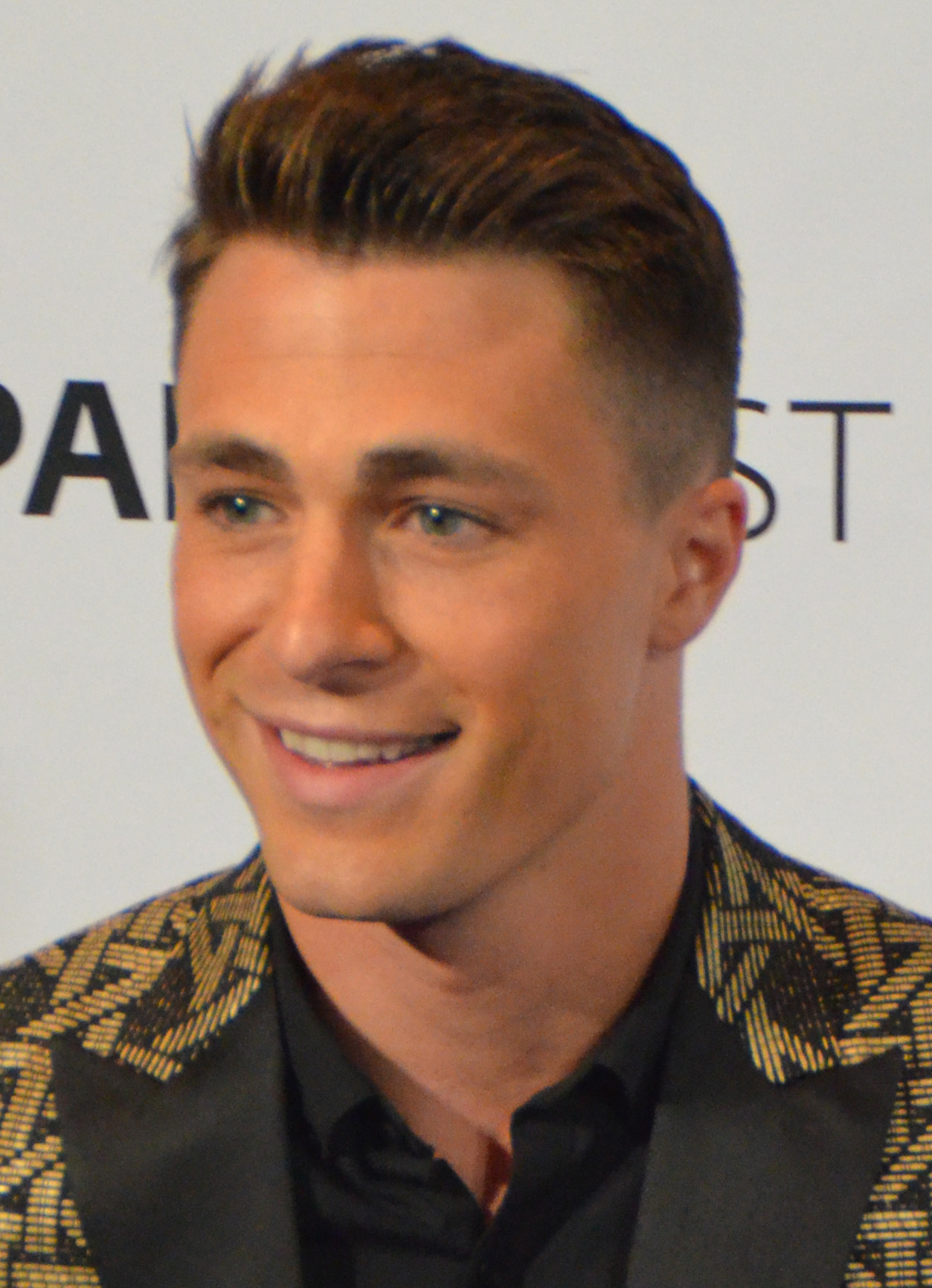
Colton Haynes returned in this episode as Roy Harper

In December 2017, it was announced that Colton Haynes was returning as his character of Roy Harper after an absence since his last guest appearance in "Unchained" since leaving in the third season. Arrow executive producers said, "We're thrilled to announce that Colton Haynes will be reprising his role as Roy Harper. Roy is called back to Star City to help resolve an urgent matter with high stakes for the team. His short visit turns into something surprising when he reunites with Thea and sparks a change in both of their lives that will have long-lasting consequences...." It was also revealed that he would have a short arc beginning in this episode.

== Reception ==
Jesse Schedeen of IGN rated the episode 7.0 and said about the episode "I was thrilled when it was announced that Haynes would be returning as Roy Harper this season. Haynes' presence has been missed on the show in recent years, both because he was a memorable part of the Team Arrow dynamic in Seasons 2 and 3 and because Thea never really made for a satisfying replacement in the vigilante sidekick department." He added "It was also nice seeing Diaz actually demonstrate his martial arts prowess for a change. In the comics, Richard Dragon is one of a small handful of post-Batman-level martial artists, and it's about time we started to get a sense of the physical powerhouse he can be. Hopefully we'll see some good Diaz/Ollie fisticuffs in the near future." Schedeen finished the review with "This week's Arrow is a clear good news/bad news situation. The long-awaited return of Roy Harper amounted to very little, begging the question of why he was brought back into the picture in the first place. But the renewed focus on Ricardo Diaz is beginning to help turn around this season's overarching conflict. The question is whether there's enough time left to truly take advantage of this status quo upheaval."

Marc Buxton of Den of Geek said in his review "this is the first episode where I really felt Diaz as a force to be reckoned with. Cayden James was an effective villain but since the twist of Diaz murdering James went down, Diaz has been so much background noise. But Diaz's torture of Roy really elevates the villain." A writer for Express Newsline, commented about this episode by saying "Right from the start of this episode, it quickly becomes clear that this Arrow episode will be a rough one for Oliver Queen. (Ignoring the season 5 episode where she tried to trick Ollie she was the real Laurel.) Yet the brilliance of this plot is how it puts Black Siren in such close quarters with Oliver and the gang. It's easy to forget just how much this show has changed and evolved over the past few years, but tossing Roy back into the ensemble really drove the point home. Now, she has escaped and is ready to resume her old life." They also added "It was nice seeing Thea back in her Speedy uniform."

Nicholas Graff of Sciencefiction.com said "Well, this was one of the episodes we had been waiting for this season, the long-awaited return of Roy Harper to 'Arrow,' and I can say it was not exactly what I had expected. Some of the side-stories seemed a bit more interesting, and it definitely felt like a bit too open-ended (I know there's a second half to it coming along in 2 weeks), so I am honestly not sure exactly how I felt about the episode." He ended his review by saying "Solid episode, always good to see Roy, though I kind of wish he was back in a more permanent fashion, and I was kind of hoping to see him suit up and go out and fight with the team again, like old times (though at least they put him in a red hoodie at the end, that was a nice-callback). I like where the show is going, though I think I want to see some closure or something on the split team storyline soon before they go to all-out war with Diaz and his SCPD goons. And I'm definitely not happy that we have a break next week before the second half of the Roy arc. Ah well, see you back here in 2 weeks!"
