= Elizabeth Kim =

Korean American journalist

Elizabeth Kim is the pen name of an American journalist who authored the book Ten Thousand Sorrows, which is described as a memoir.

== Early life ==
Kim was born in South Korea to a Korean mother and an American father. She was conceived most likely after the Korean Armistice Agreement, which ended the fighting in the Korean War. According to Kim's memories, her father abandoned her mother, who was forced to return to her hometown alone and pregnant to seek assistance from her family. After Kim's birth, she lived with her mother in a hut at the edge of town, and worked in the rice fields. When Kim was a child, as she remembers it, her mother was killed by her grandfather and uncle in what she would later describe as an "honor killing". Kim herself was left at a Seoul orphanage, with no record of her original name or her family. Eventually, she was adopted by a minister and his wife and given the name Elizabeth.

== Ten Thousand Sorrows ==
=== Writing and reactions ===
Kim was working as a journalist at the Marin Independent Journal and living in San Rafael, California, when literary agent Patti Breitman approached her about the possibility of writing a memoir. Kim was initially reluctant, but Breitman slowly convinced her of the idea; Breitman herself says that publishers were quite enthusiastic about the idea, and one even replied to her proposal within a day, simply asking her to "name a price". In the end, Kim received an advance of hundreds of thousands of dollars for her book; when it was published in May 2000, Kim quit her job at the Marin Independent Journal (despite her recent promotion to city editor) to tour in Canada, the United Kingdom, and the United States.

Andrea Behr, writing for the San Francisco Chronicle, praised Kim's writing, comparing her book to Frank McCourt's Angela's Ashes, and stating that "she has the gift of telling her story with such clear-sighted, humble honesty, and such compassion, that it's just as fascinating and compulsively readable as it is devastating". It was also reviewed favorably in O, Oprah Winfrey's magazine. Others were less positive. Salon reviewer Brigitte Frase described Kim's book as "brutal", "haunting and disturbing", and "an act of revenge", ending her review by stating that "I have read it so that you won't have to".

Some critics suspected Kim's book of being fictional rather than autobiographical, with Hillel Italie of Associated Press expressing concern that Kim's vagueness regarding dates and locations prevented the book's facts from being verifiable. It was particularly controversial in the Korean American community, some of whose members accused Kim of "exploiting the issue of biraciality" and "trying to take advantage of the [then] current interest in autobiographies, particularly those that involved violence against women". Others objected to the description of her mother's murder as an "honor killing" as being inconsistent with Korean culture. However, Korean American writer Kim Sun-jung defended the book, criticizing B. R. Myers, who lambasted what he described as the book's "ludicrous inaccuracies" about Korean culture, because Myers himself was not Korean.

=== Reviews ===
- Koji Nnamdi, WAMU
- Seiwoong Oh, Western American Literature
- Susan Soon-Keum Cox, Adoption Quarterly
- Tracy Dianne Wood, Ph.D. dissertation, U.C. Riverside

=== Editions and translations ===
Ten Thousand Sorrows was published in the following editions:

- Elizabeth Kim (2000), Ten Thousand Sorrows: The Extraordinary Journey of a Korean War Orphan, New York: Doubleday, ISBN 978-0-385-49633-9, OCLC 42753514
- Audiobook (read by the author): Elizabeth Kim (2000), Ten Thousand Sorrows: The Extraordinary Journey of a Korean War Orphan, New York: BDD Audio, ISBN 978-0-553-50258-9, OCLC 44062484
- United Kingdom edition: Elizabeth Kim (2002), Ten Thousand Sorrows: The Extraordinary Journey of a Korean War Orphan, London: Bantam Books, ISBN 978-0-553-81264-0, OCLC 51964925

It was translated into eleven languages. The below list gives unofficial translations of the foreign-language titles where the original title was not preserved.

- Chinese: Elizabeth Kim; 張娟芬 [Chang Chuan-fen, translator] (2000), 昨日不可留 [Yesterday cannot remain], Taipei: 大塊文化出版股份有限公司 [Locos Publishing Company], ISBN 978-957-0316-55-1, OCLC 50140103
- Dutch: Elizabeth Kim; Marcella Houweling (translator) (2000), Tienduizend tranen, Amsterdam: Luitingh-Sijthoff, ISBN 978-90-245-3751-8, OCLC 67359679
- Danish: Elizabeth Kim; Lene Schiøt (translator) (2001), Ti tusind sorger, København [Copenhagen]: Egmont Wangel, ISBN 978-87-608-1027-5, OCLC 462993529
- Finnish: Elizabeth Kim; Riikka Toivanen (2001), Kymmenentuhatta surua: korealaisen tytön tarina, Helsinki: WSOY, ISBN 978-951-0-25236-9, OCLC 58315443
- German: Elizabeth Kim; Maria Mill (translator) (2001), Weniger als nichts: ein Frauenschicksal zwischen Osten und Westen [Less than nothing: a woman's destiny between East and West], RM Buch-und-Medien-Vertriebs-GmbH, OCLC 759469198
- Hungarian: Elizabeth Kim; Nagy Imre (2001), Tízezer könnycsepp: egy távol-keleti nő emlékiratai, Budapest: Trivium, ISBN 978-963-7570-88-9, OCLC 440110110
- Korean: 엘리자베스김 [Elizabeth Kim]; 노진선 [Roh Jin-sun, translator] (2001), 만가지슬픔 [All kinds of sadness] (in Korean), 대산출판사 [Taesan Chulpansa], ISBN 978-89-372-0867-6, OCLC 48149370
- Turkish: Elizabeth Kim; Füsun Doruker (translator) (2001), On bin keder, İstanbul: Altın Kitaplar, ISBN 978-975-21-0160-9, OCLC 222983258
- Italian: Elizabeth Kim; Daniela Prasse (2002), Diecimila dolori, Milano: Longanesi & Co., ISBN 978-88-304-1769-4, OCLC 226228201
- Japanese: エリザベス・キム著 [Elizabeth Kim]; 雨宮絵理 [Amamiya Eri, translator] (2002), 一万の悲しみ (in Japanese), DHC, ISBN 978-4-88724-279-1, OCLC 50685924
- Polish: Elizabeth Kim; Danuta Górska (translator) (2002), Mniej niż nic [Less than nothing] (in Polish), Warszawa: Świat Ksiażk, ISBN 978-83-7311-320-6, OCLC 62764089

Further editions were published in two of those languages:

- German paperback: Elizabeth Kim; Maria Mill (translator) (2004), Ungeliebtes Kind: eine koreanische Kriegswaise kämpft um ihr Leben [Unloved Child: A Korean War orphan struggles for her life], München: Goldmann, ISBN 978-3-442-15232-2, OCLC 76488912
- Hungarian paperback: Elizabeth Kim; Nagy Imre (2006), Tízezer könnycsepp: egy távol-keleti nő emlékiratai, Budapest: Trivium, ISBN 978-963-9367-91-3, OCLC 441102719
