= Colin Wilson bibliography =

This is a bibliography of works by Colin Wilson.

The lists below provide information on Colin Wilson's major works. Individual essays, short stories and other short items are not listed separately, but most are reproduced in the items below. It is based upon Colin Stanley's The Ultimate Colin Wilson Bibliography 1956-2020, (2 volumes) Nottingham: Paupers' Press, 2020.

== Works ==
=== Fiction ===
- "The Frenchman" (short story, Evening Standard 22 August 1957)
- Ritual in the Dark (Victor Gollancz, 1960) (Reprinted, Valancourt Books, 2013) Gerard Sorme #1
- Adrift in Soho (1961)
- "Watching the Bird" (short story, Evening News 12 September 1961)
- "Uncle Tom and the Police Constable" (short story, Evening News 23 October 1961)
- "He Could not Fail" (short story, Evening News 29 December 1961)
- "Uncle and the Lion" (short story, Evening News 28 September 1962)
- "Hidden Bruise" (short story, Evening News 3 December 1962)
- "The Wooden Cubes" (short story, Evening News 27 June 1963)
- Man Without a Shadow (US title The Sex Diary of Gerard Sorme) (1963) (Reprinted, Valancourt Books, 2013) Gerard Sorme #2
- The World of Violence (US title The Violent World of Hugh Greene) (1963) (Reprinted, Valancourt Books, 2013)
- Necessary Doubt (1964) (Reprinted, Valancourt Books, 2014)
- The Glass Cage (1966) (Reprinted, Valancourt Books, 2014)
- The Mind Parasites (1967)
- The Philosopher's Stone (1969) (Reprinted, Valancourt Books, 2013)
- "The Return of the Lloigor" (first published 1969 in the anthology Tales of the Cthulhu Mythos; revised separate edition, Village Press, London, 1974).
- The God of the Labyrinth (US title The Hedonists) (1970) (Reprinted, Valancourt Books, 2013) Gerard Sorme #3
- The Killer (US title Lingard) (1970)
- The Black Room (novel, 1971)
- The Schoolgirl Murder Case (1974)
- The Space Vampires (1976)
- "Timeslip" (short story in Aries I, edited by John Grant, 1979)
- Starseekers (1980)
- "A Novelization of Events in the Life and Death of Grigori Efimovich Rasputin," in Tales of the Uncanny (Reader's Digest Association, 1983; an abbreviated version of the later The Magician from Siberia)
- The Janus Murder Case (1984)
- The Personality Surgeon (1985)
- Spider World: The Tower (1987)
- Spider World: The Delta (1987)
- The Magician from Siberia (1988)
- Spider World: The Magician (1992)
- The Tomb of the Old Ones (novella published as half of a double volume alongside a novella by John Grant, 2002)
- Spider World: Shadowland (2002)
- Lulu: an unfinished novel (with an introduction by Vaughan Rapatahana) (2017) Nottingham: Paupers' Press ISBN 9780956866387

=== Non-fiction ===
- The Outsider (1956)
- Religion and the Rebel (1957)
- The Age of Defeat (US title The Stature of Man) (1959)
- Encyclopedia of Murder (with Patricia Pitman, 1961)
- The Strength to Dream: Literature and the Imagination (1962)
- Origins of the Sexual Impulse (1963)
- Rasputin and the Fall of the Romanovs (1964)
- Brandy of the Damned (1964; later expanded and reprinted as Chords and Discords/Colin Wilson On Music)
- Beyond the Outsider (1965)
- Eagle and Earwig (1965)
- Sex and the Intelligent Teenager (1966)
- Introduction to the New Existentialism (1966)
- Voyage to a Beginning (1969)
- A Casebook of Murder (1969)
- Bernard Shaw: A Reassessment (1969)
- Poetry and Mysticism (1969; subsequently significantly expanded in 1970)
- L'amour: The Ways of Love (1970)
- The Strange Genius of David Lindsay (with E. H. Visiak and J. B. Pick, 1970)
- The Occult: A History (1971)
- Order of Assassins: The Psychology of Murder (1972)
- New Pathways in Psychology: Maslow and the Post-Freudian Revolution (1972)
- Strange Powers (1973)
- "Tree" by Tolkien (1973)
- Hermann Hesse (1974)
- Wilhelm Reich (1974)
- Jorge Luis Borges (1974)
- Hesse-Reich-Borges: Three Essays (1974)
- Ken Russell: A Director in Search of a Hero (1974)
- A Book of Booze (1974)
- The Unexplained (1975)
- Mysterious Powers (US title They Had Strange Powers) (1975)
- The Craft of the Novel (1975)
- Enigmas and Mysteries (1975)
- The Geller Phenomenon (1975), ISBN 0-7172-8105-1
- Colin Wilson's Men of Mystery (US title Dark Dimensions) (with various authors, 1977)
- Mysteries (1978)
- Mysteries of the Mind (with Stuart Holroyd, 1978)
- The Haunted Man: The Strange Genius of David Lindsay (1979)
- Science Fiction as Existentialism (1980)
- Frankenstein's Castle: the Right Brain-Door to Wisdom (1980)
- The Book of Time, edited by John Grant and Colin Wilson (1980)
- The War Against Sleep: The Philosophy of Gurdjieff (1980)
- The Directory of Possibilities, edited by Colin Wilson and John Grant (1981)
- Poltergeist!: A Study in Destructive Haunting (1981)
- Anti-Sartre, with an Essay on Camus (1981)
- The Quest for Wilhelm Reich (1981)
- The Goblin Universe (with Ted Holiday, 1982)
- Access to Inner Worlds: The Story of Brad Absetz (1983)
- Encyclopedia of Modern Murder, 1962-83 (1983)
- The Psychic Detectives: The Story of Psychometry and Paranormal Crime Detection (1984)
- A Criminal History of Mankind (1984), revised and updated (2005)
- Lord of the Underworld: Jung and the Twentieth Century (1984)
- The Bicameral Critic (1985)
- The Essential Colin Wilson (Robert Briggs Associates/Celestial Arts, 1985) ISBN 9780890874721
- Rudolf Steiner: The Man and His Vision (1985)
- Afterlife: An Investigation of the Evidence of Life After Death (1985)
- An Encyclopedia of Scandal. Edited by Colin Wilson and Donald Seaman (1986)
- The Book of Great Mysteries. Edited by Colin Wilson and Dr. Christopher Evans (1986), ISBN 0948164263
- An Essay on the 'New' Existentialism (1988)
- The Laurel & Hardy Theory of Consciousness. Robert Briggs Associates. June 1986. ISBN 978-0931191046.
- Marx Refuted – The Verdict of History, edited by Colin Wilson (with contributions also) and Ronald Duncan, Bath, (UK), (1987), ISBN 0-906798-71-X
- Aleister Crowley: The Nature of the Beast (1987)
- The Musician as 'Outsider'. (1987)
- The Encyclopedia of Unsolved Mysteries (with Damon Wilson, 1987)
- Jack the Ripper: Summing Up and Verdict (with Robin Odell, 1987)
- Autobiographical Reflections (1988)
- The Misfits: A Study of Sexual Outsiders (1988)
- Beyond the Occult (1988)
- The Mammoth Book of True Crime (1988)
- The Decline and Fall of Leftism (1989)
- Written in Blood: A History of Forensic Detection (1989)
- Existentially Speaking: Essays on the Philosophy of Literature (1989)
- Serial Killers: A Study in the Psychology of Violence (1990)
- The Strange Life of P.D. Ouspensky (1993)
- Unsolved Mysteries (with Damon Wilson, 1993)
- Outline of the Female Outsider (1994)
- A Plague of Murder (1995)
- From Atlantis to the Sphinx (1996)
- An Extraordinary Man in the Age of Pigmies: Colin Wilson on Henry Miller (1996)
- The Unexplained Mysteries of the Universe (1997) ISBN 0-7513-5983-1
- The Atlas of Sacred Places (1997)
- Below the Iceberg: Anti-Sartre and Other Essays (reissue with essays on postmodernism, 1998)
- The Corpse Garden (1998)
- The Books in My Life (1998)
- Alien Dawn (1999)
- The Devil's Party (US title Rogue Messiahs) (2000)
- The Atlantis Blueprint (with Rand Flem-Ath, 2000)
- Illustrated True Crime: A Photographic History (2002)
- Dreaming to Some Purpose (2004) - autobiography
- World Famous UFOs (2005)
- Atlantis and the Kingdom of the Neanderthals (2006)
- Crimes of Passion: The Thin Line Between Love and Hate (2006)
- The Angry Years: The Rise and Fall of the Angry Young Men (2007)
- Manhunters: Criminal Profilers & Their Search for the World's Most Wanted Serial Killers (2007)
- Super Consciousness (2009)
- Existential Criticism: selected book reviews (edited by Colin Stanley) (2009)
- Comments on Boredom/Evolutionary Humanism and the New Psychology (2013)
- Introduction to 'The Faces of Evil': an unpublished book (2013)
- An End to Murder (with Damon Wilson) (2015)
- Collected Essays on Philosophers (edited by Colin Stanley) (2016)
- My Interest in Murder: being a discarded introduction to "Order of Assassins" (2018)
- The Ultimate Colin Wilson: Writings on Mysticism, Consciousness and Existentialism (edited by Colin Stanley) (2019)
- Introducing the Occult: selected Introductions, Prefaces, Forewords and Afterwords (edited by Colin Stanley) (December 2022)

=== Plays ===
- Strindberg (1970)
- Mozart's Journey to Prague (1992)
- The Death of God' and other plays (edited by Colin Stanley) (2008)

=== Unpublished works ===
- The Anatomy of Human Greatness (non-fiction, written 1964; Maurice Bassett plans to publish this work electronically)
- Metamorphosis of the Vampire (fiction, written 1992–94)
