= Nannie Doss =

American serial killer (1905–1965)

- Mugshot, October 1954
- Born: Nancy Agnes Hazel; November 4, 1905; Blue Mountain, Alabama, U.S.
- Died: June 2, 1965 (aged 59); Oklahoma State Penitentiary, McAlester, Oklahoma, U.S.
- Resting place: Oak Hill Memorial Park
- Other names: The Giggling Nanny; The Giggling Granny; The Jolly Black Widow; The Lonely Hearts Killer
- Spouse: Charley Braggs (m. 1921; div. 1928) Robert Franklin Harrelson (m. 1929; died 1945) Arlie Jackson Lanning (m. 1946; died 1952) Richard Lewis Morton Sr. (m. 1952; died 1953) Samuel Luther Doss (m. 1954; died 1954)
- Motive: Life insurance money Search for "the real romance of life"
- Conviction: Murder (1 count)
- Penalty: Life imprisonment

Details
- Victims: 11
- Span of crimes: 1927–1954
- Country: United States
- States: Alabama; North Carolina; Kansas; Oklahoma
- Date apprehended: October 1954

Nannie Doss (born November 4, 1905 – June 2, 1965) was an American serial killer responsible for the deaths of 11 people between 1927 and 1954. Doss was also referred to as the Giggling Granny, the Lonely Hearts Killer, the Black Widow, and Lady Blue Beard.

Doss finally confessed to the murders in October 1954, after her fifth husband died in a small hospital in Tulsa, Oklahoma. In all, it was revealed that she had killed four husbands, two children, one of her sisters, her mother, two grandsons, and a mother-in-law.

== Early life ==
Nannie was born on November 4, 1905 in Blue Mountain, Alabama, now part of Anniston, to Louisa "Lou" (née Holder) and James F. Hazel. She had one brother and four sisters. Doss' father worked as a railroader, but in 1920 when Doss was in her teens she took over the family farm. Both Nannie and her mother hated James, who was a controlling and abusive father and husband. James would force his children to work on the family farm, refusing to let them attend school, which resulted in Nannie's poor academic performance.

Once when Nannie was 7 and taking a train with her family to visit relatives in southern Alabama, the train abruptly stopped and she hit her head on a metal bar on the seat in front of her. For years afterward she suffered severe headaches, blackouts, and depression. She blamed these and her mental instability on that accident.

During childhood, her favorite hobby was reading her mother's romance magazines and dreaming of her own romantic future. Her favorite part was the lonely hearts column. Nannie's father forbade his daughters to wear makeup and attractive clothing as he believed it would prevent them from being molested by men; despite this, she was raped many times in her childhood, which her father refused to believe. He also forbade them to go to dances and other social events.

== First marriage ==
Nannie was first married at age 16 to Charley Braggs, her co-worker at a linen factory. With her father's approval they married after four months of dating. Braggs was the only son of a single mother who insisted on continuing to live with him after he married. Nannie later wrote:

I married, as my father wished, in 1921 to a boy I only knew about four or five months who had no family, only a mother who was unwed and who had taken over my life completely when we were married. She never seen anything wrong with what she done, but she would take spells. She would not let my own mother stay all night...

Braggs' mother took up a lot of his attention and limited Nannie's activities. The marriage produced four daughters from 1923 to 1927. The stressed-out Nannie started drinking, and her casual smoking habit became a heavy addiction. Both unhappy partners correctly suspected each other of infidelity, and Braggs often disappeared for days on end.

In 1927, the couple lost their two middle girls to suspected food poisoning. Soon after, Braggs took firstborn daughter Melvina and fled, leaving newborn Florine behind. Braggs' mother died not much later and Nannie took a job in a cotton mill to support Florine and herself. Braggs brought Melvina back in the summer of 1928, accompanied by a divorcée with her own child. Braggs and Nannie soon divorced, and Nannie took her two girls back to her mother's home. Braggs always maintained he left her because he was frightened of her.

== Second marriage ==
Her second husband was Robert Franklin Harrelson. They met and married in 1929. They lived in Jacksonville with Melvina and Florine. After a few months, she discovered that he was an alcoholic and had a criminal record for assault. Despite this, the marriage lasted 16 years.

=== Grandchildren ===
Melvina gave birth to Robert Lee Haynes in 1943. Another baby followed two years later but died soon afterward. Exhausted from labor and groggy from ether, Melvina thought she saw her visiting mother stick a hatpin into the baby's head. When she asked her husband and sister for clarification, they said Nannie had told them the baby was dead—and they noticed that she was holding a pin. The doctors, however, could not give a positive explanation.

The grieving parents drifted apart and Melvina started dating a soldier. Nannie disapproved of him, and while Melvina was visiting her father after a particularly nasty fight with her mother, her son Robert died mysteriously under Nannie's care on July 7, 1945. The death was diagnosed as asphyxia from unknown causes, and two months later Nannie collected the $500 life insurance she had taken out on Robert.

=== Death of Harrelson ===
In 1945, Harrelson allegedly raped Nannie. The next day, she put rat poison in Harrelson's corn whiskey jar, and he died that evening.

== Later marriages ==
Nannie met her third husband, Arlie Lanning, through another lonely-hearts column while travelling in Lexington, North Carolina, and married him three days later. Like Harrelson, Lanning was an alcoholic womanizer. However, in this marriage it was Nannie who often disappeared—and for months on end. But when she was home, she played the doting housewife, and when he died of what was said to be heart failure, the townspeople supported her at his funeral.

Soon after, the couple's house, which had been left to Lanning's sister, burned down. The insurance money went to Nannie, who quickly banked it, and after Lanning's mother died in her sleep, Nannie left North Carolina and ended up at her sister Dovie's home. Dovie was bedridden and soon after Nannie's arrival she died.

Looking for yet another husband, Nannie joined a dating service called the Diamond Circle Club and soon met Richard L. Morton of Jamestown, North Carolina. They married in 1952 in Emporia, Kansas. He did not have a drinking problem, but he was adulterous. Before she poisoned him, she poisoned her mother, Louisa, in January 1953 when she came to live with them. Morton died three months later on May 19, 1953.

Nannie married Samuel Doss of Tulsa, Oklahoma, in June 1953. Doss was a Nazarene minister who had lost his family to a tornado in Carroll County, Arkansas. Samuel disapproved of the romance novels and stories that his wife adored. In September, Samuel was admitted to the hospital with flu-like symptoms. The hospital diagnosed a severe digestive tract infection. He was treated and released on October 5. Samuel died on October 12, 1954. Nannie killed him that evening in her rush to collect the two life-insurance policies she had taken out on him. This sudden death alerted his doctor, who ordered an autopsy. The autopsy revealed a huge amount of arsenic in his system. Nannie was promptly arrested.

== Confession and conviction ==
Doss confessed to killing four of her husbands, her mother, her sister, her grandson, and her mother-in-law. The state of Oklahoma centered its case only on Samuel Doss. Nannie Doss was prosecuted by J. Howard Edmondson, who later became governor of Oklahoma. She pled guilty on May 17, 1955, and was sentenced to life imprisonment; the state did not pursue the death penalty due to her sex. Doss was never charged with the other deaths. She died from leukemia in the hospital ward of the Oklahoma State Penitentiary in 1965. She is buried at Oak Hill Memorial Park in McAlester, Oklahoma.

== See also ==
- List of serial killers in the United States
- List of serial killers by number of victims

== Bibliography ==
- Wilson, Colin. The Mammoth Book of True Crime. New York: Carroll & Graf Publishers, 1998. ISBN 0-7867-0536-1
