= The Killer (Wilson novel) =

1970 novel by Colin Wilson

- First edition cover
- Author: Colin Wilson
- Language: English
- Genre: Crime novel
- Publisher: New English Library
- Publication date: May 1970
- Publication place: England
- Media type: Print (Hardback)
- Pages: 224
- ISBN: 978-0-450-00467-4
- Preceded by: The Mind Parasites
- Followed by: The Occult: A History

The Killer (published in the US as Lingard) is a 1970 novel by Colin Wilson about Arthur Lingard, a mentally unstable man with a troubled history of crime, incest and extremely violent behavior. He is an inmate at the Rose Hill experimental prison near Sedgefield, serving the last years of an eight-year sentence for a second-degree murder. The minimum security is due to the inference of the state authorities that Lingard is a "harmless vegetable". The prison doctor Samuel Kahn (the novel's narrator) disagrees with this due to his deep insight into Lingard's unfathomable psyche. The doctor discovers that in addition to Lingard's known crimes he is also responsible for a number of unsolved sex murders.

The critics called it "a shattering novel about a modern Jack the Ripper".
