= Dreaming to Some Purpose =

2004 book by Colin Wilson

- Author: Colin Wilson
- Language: English
- Genre: autobiography
- Publisher: Century
- Publication date: 2004
- Publication place: United Kingdom
- Pages: 402
- ISBN: 9781844131884

Dreaming to Some Purpose is a 2004 autobiography by the English writer Colin Wilson. It covers Wilson's youth as a school dropout, his brief critical success with The Outsider and subsequent public life in the 1950s, his return to bestseller lists with The Occult: A History from 1971, and his following career of writing books at a high pace, often about occult and paranormal subjects.
