= Lifeforce (film) =

1985 British science fiction horror film by Tobe Hooper

- United States theatrical release poster
- Directed by: Tobe Hooper
- Screenplay by: Dan O'Bannon; Don Jakoby
- Based on: The Space Vampires by Colin Wilson
- Produced by: Yoram Globus; Menahem Golan
- Starring: Steve Railsback; Peter Firth; Frank Finlay; Mathilda May
- Cinematography: Alan Hume
- Edited by: John Grover
- Music by: Henry Mancini
- Production companies: London-Cannon Films; Easedram
- Distributed by: Cannon Film Distributors
- Release date: 21 June 1985
- Running time: 101 minutes (theatrical cut); 116 minutes (international cut)
- Country: United Kingdom
- Language: English
- Budget: $25 million
- Box office: $11.6 million (US)

Lifeforce is a 1985 British science fiction horror film directed by Tobe Hooper, adapted by Dan O'Bannon and Don Jakoby, and starring Steve Railsback, Peter Firth, Frank Finlay, and Mathilda May. Based on Colin Wilson's 1976 novel The Space Vampires, the film portrays the events that unfold when a trio of humanoids in a state of suspended animation are brought to Earth after being discovered in the hold of an alien space ship by the crew of a European Space Shuttle.

Two cuts of Lifeforce were released: a 116-minute "international cut", and a 101-minute cut ordered by American distributor Tri-Star Pictures for the film's theatrical release in the United States. Lifeforce received mixed reviews and was a box office failure, but has since become a cult film.

== Plot ==
The crew of the joint British and American Space Shuttle Churchill, under the command of Colonel Tom Carlsen, finds a 150-mile-long (240 km) spaceship hidden in the coma of Halley's Comet. Inside, the crew discovers hundreds of desiccated bat-like creatures and three naked humanoid bodies (two male and one female) in suspended animation within glass containers. The crew recovers a bat-alien and the three bodies and begins the return trip to Earth. During the return journey, mission control loses contact with Churchill.

A rescue mission discovers that Churchill has been gutted by fire. The crew is dead and the escape pod is missing, yet the three containers bearing the bodies remain intact. The bodies are taken to the European Space Research Centre in London. Prior to a postmortem, the female alien awakens and drains the life force from a guard. She escapes the facility and drains other humans of their life force. The two male vampires awaken and violently attempt escape, but are apparently destroyed by grenades thrown by another guard. The guard drained by the female alien revives two hours after his death, with the ability to drain others of their life force.

The Churchill escape pod is found with Carlsen inside. He recounts the events aboard Churchill, including feeling compelled to open the female vampire's container and share his life force with her, leading to the draining of the Churchill crew's life force. He set fire to the shuttle to save Earth from the same fate and escaped in the pod. When hypnotised, it becomes clear that he has a psychic link to the female alien, and he reveals her ability to shapeshift. Carlsen and SAS Colonel Colin Caine trace her to a psychiatric hospital in Yorkshire, where they believe they have trapped her within the heavily sedated body of the hospital manager, Dr. Armstrong.

The two male vampires have survived by shapeshifting into the soldiers who killed their previous bodies, and now are infecting London's population. The female alien escapes from her sedated host and disappears. Martial law is declared as vampires multiply by absorbing the life force of humans. The life forces are channeled by the male vampires to the female vampire, who transmits the energy to their spaceship, now in geosynchronous orbit over London.

Hans Fallada impales a male vampire with an ancient weapon of "leaded iron." He, Carlsen, and Caine surmise that the vampires have visited Earth periodically with the coming of Halley's Comet, creating the vampire legends. Caine finds Fallada, possessed and manic, and shoots him. Fallada desiccates. Caine retrieves the weapon from a dead corpse which explodes into dust. Carlsen tracks the female vampire to St Paul's Cathedral, where she is lying upon the altar, transferring energy to her spaceship. She reveals she and Carlsen are now a part of each other due to the sharing of their life forces. Caine kills the second male vampire and throws the weapon to Carlsen, who impales himself and the female alien simultaneously. A burst of energy blows open the dome of St Paul's. The two ascend the column of energy to the spaceship, which returns to the comet as Caine watches.

== Cast ==
- Steve Railsback as Col. Tom Carlsen
- Peter Firth as Col. Colin Caine
- Frank Finlay as Hans Fallada
- Mathilda May as Space Girl
- Patrick Stewart as Dr. Armstrong
- Michael Gothard as Leonard Bukovsky
- Nicholas Ball as Roger Derebridge
- Aubrey Morris as Percy Heseltine
- Nancy Paul as Ellen
- Sidney Livingstone as Ned Price
- John Hallam as Lamson
- Chris Jagger as 1st vampire
- Bill Malin as 2nd vampire
- Jamie Roberts as Rawlings
- Chris Sullivan as Kelly
- Ken Parry as Sykes

== Production ==
=== Background ===
Lifeforce was the first film of Tobe Hooper's three-picture deal with Cannon Films, following Poltergeist in 1982, which was a collaboration with producer Steven Spielberg. The other two films are the remake of Invaders from Mars and The Texas Chainsaw Massacre 2.

Before Hooper was finally approved, Michael Winner was offered the chance to direct the film.

It has been suggested that Lifeforce is largely a remake of Hammer Film Productions's Quatermass and the Pit. In an interview, director Tobe Hooper discussed how Cannon Films gave him $25 million, free rein, and Colin Wilson's book The Space Vampires. Hooper then shares how giddy he was: "I thought I'd go back to my roots and make a 70 mm Hammer film."

=== Screenplay ===
The screenplay was written by Dan O'Bannon and Don Jakoby (both would also collaborate with Tobe Hooper in Invaders from Mars). Hooper came up with the idea of using Halley's Comet in the screenplay, rather than the asteroid belt in the novel, as the comet was going to pass by Earth in early 1986, less than a year after the film's release. The time settings were also changed from the mid-21st century to the present day. Michael Armstrong and Olaf Pooley were brought on during production to perform uncredited rewrites, Armstrong acting as a liaison between Hooper and the art department.

Before the premiere Hooper said, "The spirit of the book is certainly there from my interpretation of the reading. Though Colin Wilson's novel was set in the future, I made it a contemporary piece for identification. Also, I tied in Halley's comet, where they make the find of the alien ship. It has been millions of years in the coma of Halley's comet, traveling as a parasite of sorts. But, basically, I think the movie embodies the same spiritual feeling that Colin Wilson intended."

Colin Wilson was unhappy with the finished film. He later wrote: "John Fowles had once told me that the film of The Magus was the worst movie ever made. After seeing Lifeforce I sent him a postcard telling him that I had got one better." He was also quoted as quipping "Well, at least there's lots of full-frontal nudity."

A year after the release, Hooper admitted "Lifeforce had a great look but lacked a screenplay. There wasn't a hell of a lot that could be done about that except to change it completely. The film started off as Space Vampires, and that's actually what it should've been called. With that title you'd look at that picture with a completely different set of sunglasses!"

=== Casting ===
In February 1984, Billy Idol said he had been offered a lead role as a vampire by Hooper, who had directed the video of "Dancing with Myself", but turned it down due to touring commitments.

In April 1984, John Gielgud said "I was recently offered an enormous sum to play in a film called Space Vampires, and I nearly fell for it because it would have been nice to have had the money. But the next time I heard from them the figure had somehow been reduced by half, so I said no".

Mathilda May, an 18-year-old French actress, was cast as the female space vampire, a role that required extensive nudity. The filmmakers had difficulty finding an actress willing to perform the role and ultimately cast May after searching in Paris.

=== Filming ===
Filming began on 2 February 1984. The film was shot in Britain. It was originally scheduled for 17 weeks. It went five weeks over. "The Cannon people were great," Railsback said. "All they told Tobe was: 'Keep going.'"

According to interviews with Bill Malin, who plays one of the male vampires, the film went over schedule during production. Because of this some important scenes were never shot, and the film was shut down at one time because the studio had simply run out of money.

The extensive nudity required for May's role also presented challenges during filming. Makeup artist Sandra Exelby later recalled that Hooper wanted May's body hair completely removed, believing that doing so would make the character appear less nude. Exelby objected because of May's age, and a compromise was reached in which her pubic hair was instead kept short and lightened, requiring regular maintenance during filming.

Editor John Grover later recalled that some of Hooper's original footage of May was shot from angles considered too explicit for a commercial studio release, requiring footage to be cut or reshot.

The film marked the fourth project to feature special effects produced by Academy Award winner John Dykstra, who in 1986 was granted with the "Caixa Catalunya Award for Best Special Effects" at the Sitges Film Festival (located in Spain) for his special effects work in Lifeforce. (Note: This award (presented annually) is the Special Effects Award attributed by the Sitges Film Festival, but its name has changed among years, depending on different sponsors. In 1986 it was called "Premio Caixa Catalunya a los Mejores Efectos Especiales" ("Caixa Catalunya Award for Best Special Effects") since that year the sponsor was Caixa Catalunya, a local bank.) The umbrella-like alien spaceship was modelled after an artichoke, while the model London destroyed in the film was actually the remains of Tucktonia, a model village near Christchurch, United Kingdom, that had closed not long before the shooting of the film. It took a week to film the death scene of the pathologist played by Jerome Willis, and bodycasts of Frank Finlay, Patrick Stewart and Aubrey Morris were made by make-up effects supervisor Nick Maley for their death scenes.

One effect near the end of the film involving the column of energy rising from the female alien through the top of St. Paul's Cathedral to the spacecraft was engineered by art director Tony Reading. A column of retroreflective material was placed against black velvet and a crew member blew cigar smoke into its bottom. This image was then front projected onto a translucent projection screen behind the actors to create the energy column.

=== Music ===
James Horner was first asked to write the score before Henry Mancini was brought in and produced a score consisting of 90 minutes of occasionally atonal and ambient music using the London Symphony Orchestra. Mancini had agreed to do the film based on the original concept of a 15-minute essentially dialogue-free opening sequence involving the discovery and exploration of the alien spacecraft and the moving of the three aliens back to the Churchill, for which he composed a tonal "space ballet".

For the American domestic version, Michael Kamen and James Guthrie were asked to write occasional music cues that were placed in at the last minute.

=== Editing and post-production ===
The film was originally filmed and promoted under the same title as the Colin Wilson novel. Cannon Films, which reportedly spent nearly $25 million in hopes of creating a blockbuster film, disliked The Space Vampires for sounding too much like another of the studio's typical low budget exploitation films. As a result, the title was changed to Lifeforce, referring to the spiritual energy the space vampires drain from their victims, and it was edited for its US theatrical release by TriStar Pictures into a 101-minute domestic cut that was partially re-scored by Michael Kamen, with a majority of Henry Mancini's original music remaining.

The initial cut of Lifeforce as edited by Tobe Hooper was 128 minutes long. This is 12 minutes longer than the final version which had several scenes cut, most of them taking place on the Space Shuttle Churchill. According to Nicholas Ball, who played the main British astronaut, Derebridge, it was felt that there was too much material in outer space and so the majority of the Churchill scenes were deleted. Also, most of Nicholas Ball's performance ended up on the cutting room floor according to an interview he gave on the UK talk show Wogan in 1985.

Despite being credited on the US domestic cut, the following actors were deleted from that cut of the film: John Woodnutt, John Forbes-Robertson and Russell Sommers. The Churchill commanding officer Rawlins, played by Geoffrey Frederick, was British, but in post-production it was decided that Patrick Jordan would dub his voice. Also in the US version, some of Geoffrey Frederick's voiceover heard on the Churchill is dubbed.

== Reception ==
=== Box office ===
Lifeforce was released on 21 June 1985 to poor box office returns. The film opened in fourth place, losing a head-to-head battle against Ron Howard's science fiction film Cocoon. The film earned $11,603,545 at the US box office.

=== Critical response ===
On release, the film received negative reviews from American critics. Janet Maslin of The New York Times wrote, "[I]ts style is shrill and fragmented enough to turn Lifeforce into hysterical vampire porn." Michael Wilmington, in the Los Angeles Times, wrote that the film was "such a peculiar movie [that] it's difficult to get a handle on it". Jay Carr wrote in The Boston Globe that "it plays like a tap-dancing zombie." John Clute dismissed Lifeforce as a "deeply silly flick". Leonard Maltin called the film "completely crazy" and said it was "ridiculous, but so bizarre, it's fascinating".

On the other hand, horror and comic book writer C. J. Henderson praised the film: "Lifeforce is an incredible film, and may be the most intelligent vampire movie ever made ... [the ideas presented in Lifeforce] are beyond [other vampire movies,] beyond all of them, light-years beyond ... the story is what makes this movie hum. ... Lifeforce is a true, thinking sci-fi fan's film." Andrew Migliore and John Strysik, in their Lurker in the Lobby, explained that Colin Wilson wrote The Space Vampires as a consequence of H.P. Lovecraft's publisher August Derleth challenging Wilson (who was critical of Lovecraft's writing) to write a Lovecraftian novel himself (a challenge that resulted in three such novels, The Mind Parasites, The Space Vampires, and The Philosopher's Stone), and they continued, "Lifeforce is big, splashy, and...the scenes of an apocalyptic London are not to be missed. And the film, an obvious tribute to Nigel Kneale's Quatermass, has deep roots in Lovecraft's mythos." Film critic Gene Siskel, of Siskel & Ebert, called the film a "guilty-pleasure", awarding it 3 out of 4 stars.

On the review aggregator website Rotten Tomatoes, Lifeforce holds a 58% approval rating based on 33 critic reviews, with an average rating of 5.5/10. The consensus reads, "Brazenly strange and uneven in its execution, Lifeforce is an otherworldly sci-fi excursion punctuated with off-kilter horror flourishes." On Metacritic, the film has a weighted average score of 50 out of 100 based on 12 critics, indicating "mixed or average reviews".

== Home media ==
The first release on video in the UK was the heavily edited US "domestic cut". The full "international cut" was not available until it was released by MGM in the 2000s. The first US release of the "international cut" was MGM/UA's 1994 release on deluxe widescreen letterboxed LaserDisc.

Scream Factory announced they would be releasing Lifeforce in a Blu-ray/DVD Combo Pack on 18 June 2013. This included the US domestic cut, as well as the international cut of the film.

Arrow Video released Lifeforce in the UK as a steelbook two-disc Blu-ray special edition on 14 October 2013, with the same features as the US Blu-ray release.

A 4K Ultra HD Blu-ray was released on May 24, 2022, by Scream Factory. Only the 101-minute US cut is in 4K resolution; the 116-minute international cut is in 1080p.

A 4K Ultra HD Blu-ray was released on February 17, 2025, by Arrow Video, This version includes both the 101-minute US cut and the 116-minute international cut in 4K UHD. Both films are presented with Dolby Vision and Atmos.

== See also ==
- Planet of the Vampires
- Vampire film

== Bibliography ==
- Gross, Edward (October 1985). "Don Jakoby". Starlog. pp. 34–37.
- Sciaca, Tom (September 1985). "Lifeforce". Starburst Magazine. pp. 24–27.
- Weinberg, Marc (August 1985). "Lifeforce". Fangoria. No. 46. pp. 22–25.
