= Misfits =

Misfits or The Misfits may refer to:

== Film and television ==
- The Misfits (1961 film), a film starring Clark Gable, Marilyn Monroe, and Montgomery Clift
- The Misfits (2011 film), a Mexican film
- The Misfits (2021 film), an American film
- Misfits (TV series), a British television series

== Music ==
=== Albums ===
- Misfits (Blanco & The Jacka album)
- Misfits (Sara Hickman album)
- Misfits (The Kinks album)
- Misfits (Misfits album)
- The Misfits (album), a box set by the Misfits

=== Songs ===
- "Misfits" (Cold Chisel song)
- "Misfits" (The Kinks song)
- "Misfits" (Neil Young song)
- "Misfits", by XO-IQ, featured in the television series Make It Pop

=== Other uses in music ===
- Misfits (band), an American punk rock band from New Jersey
- Misfits (quartet), a barbershop quartet
- Misfits, a British rock band formed in 1979 by Rusty Egan and Midge Ure
- The Misfits, a fictional musical group in the television series Jem
- Misfits Records

== Other uses ==
- MISFITS, the Minnesota Society for Interest in Science Fiction and Fantasy
- The Misfits: A Study of Sexual Outsiders, by Colin Henry Wilson
- The Misfits, a novel by James Howe
- Misfits, a documentary play by Alex Finlayson about the making of the 1961 film
- Misfits Boxing, a promotion founded by British entertainer KSI
- Misfits Gaming, a professional e-sports team in Europe

== See also ==
- Misfit (disambiguation)
