= A Criminal History of Mankind =

1984 book by Colin Wilson

- Author: Colin Wilson
- Language: English
- Subject: crime
- Publisher: Granada
- Publication date: 1984
- Publication place: United Kingdom
- Pages: 702
- ISBN: 0246116366

A Criminal History of Mankind is a 1984 book by the English writer Colin Wilson. It describes a large number of crime cases from around the world, which are used to present philosophical ideas and a history of human consciousness.

== Overview ==
Its starting point was Wilson's view of how the same qualities that make humans creative and curious about the world also are responsible for serious crimes, and how the Industrial Revolution has impacted crime, creating seemingly "motiveless murders" that cannot be explained by material needs. An expanded version of the book that includes newer cases was published in 2005.

== Reception ==
The book was generally well received in the British media but was not as commercially successful as Wilson's The Occult: A History (1971) and Mysteries (1978), to which it had a similar level of ambition. In 2011, Philip Coulthard wrote that the "juxtaposition of violence and evolution through the book is particularly stunning", and "best of all, this being Wilson, none of it is depressing".
