= A Year of Grace =

1950 anthology compiled by Victor Gollancz

- First edition (UK)
- Author: Victor Gollancz
- Publication date: 1950

A Year of Grace is a 1950 anthology compiled by Victor Gollancz, consisting of passages (and some pieces of music) concerning religious and spiritual life, taken from a variety of different sources.

The sources include the writings of a number of rabbis, European and American philosophers, psychologists, poets and theologians, as well as some Biblical scripture. Islam and Hinduism are represented by Rumi and Hafiz, Ramakrishna and Kabir, the Baghavad Gita and the Upanishads.

== Composition and publication ==
Gollancz started reading for the book (which he also used in From Darkness to Light) over the winter of 1943, when recovering from a nervous breakdown he had had in June of that year, and worked on it intermittently until it was published. He wrote it over the winter of 1949, and it was published on 2 October 1950. Gollancz gave the royalties from the book to his daughters, and felt the book would do good to the world.

A Year of Grace became a Christmas bestseller in the UK and by June 1951 had sold a healthy 40,000. In America the book was published as Man and God by Houghton Mifflin, and was made Book of the Month Club Choice. However, it sold much less well on the other side of the Atlantic, only shifting 5,000 copies.

== Synopsis and polemic intent ==
The book is divided into five parts. The first part concerns God's Mercy and Love, A Reading of Christ, and Joy and Praise. The second part focuses on Good and Evil, Sin and Repentance, and Man, fellow-worker with God. The third part covers The Relation of Man to Man. The fourth part is broken into six sections: Acceptance, Man's Dignity and Responsibility, Activity, Integrity, Humility, and Freedom. The fifth and final part looks at The Self, Intimations, and The Many and the One.

In his foreword, Gollancz writes that the work is a "rather polemical" approach to expressing a mood, rather than a doctrine, about God and man. It is a response to both anti-religious humanism and anti-humanistic religion. Earlier in 1950, prior to the publication of A Year of Grace, Gollancz gave lectures on religion and humanism while on a visit to Germany. He focused on the twin dangers of anti-religious humanism, which regarded mankind as self-sufficient, and anti-humanistic religion, which gave a view of man as a "wretched, powerless, worthless sinner, miserable slave of a God conceived of as capricious and omnipotent tyrant". Religious humanism combined a belief in man's creative potential with "man as a fellow-worker with God". For Gollancz freedom was key to this line of thought. He intended the book to be read consecutively, so each passage might illuminate the other, and although he acknowledged that it is full of contradictions, he hoped the mood is consistent. Martin Buber, the Jewish philosopher, helped revise the translations from his own Jewish Mysticism and the Legends of Baalshem. On an autobiographical note, Gollancz writes that the mood of the anthology is one that has been with him since a very small boy. In 1961 he published The New Year of Grace: an Anthology for Youth and Age, including new selections and personal commentaries.

== Influences ==
Rabbi Lionel Blue has credited the selections in A Year of Grace as having infected him with spirituality "like measles", and credits the book with steering him away from an anti-religious attitude. Author Colin Wilson writes that he was inspired to send his book The Outsider to Gollancz after finding a copy of A Year of Grace in a second-hand bookshop, believing that he had found a sympathetic publisher. Gollancz reacted enthusiastically to Wilson and published the book.

== Reception ==
Plaudits for A Year of Grace came from a wide readership, including Alec Vidler, the Anglican theologian, who found it compassionate and searching. Many of Gollancz's friends gave positive comments, including George Bell, the Bishop of Chichester, Lettice Cooper, Stafford Cripps, Daphne Du Maurier and Dean Inge. Rose Macaulay disliked certain inclusions, particularly those of William Blake. Overall the book received a small, but largely positive press. Gollancz often wrote to reviewers who he felt had misunderstood his message, and A Year of Grace was no exception. He corrected Herbert Read's suggestion in the New Statesman that Gollancz was disillusioned with politics, when nothing was further from the truth – rather, he wrote in a letter to the magazine, the book demonstrated that politics was an essential activity.

Jill Balcon read extracts from A Year of Grace at Gollancz's funeral. On the BBC Radio programme Desert Island Discs, the anthology was chosen as the castaway's book by both Victor Gollancz, in 1961, and travel writer Colin Thubron in 1989.
