= Gary Lachman =

American writer and musician

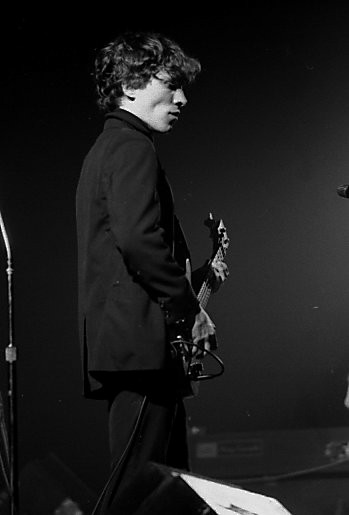
- Lachman performing with Blondie in 1976

Background information
- Also known as: Gary Valentine
- Born: Gary Joseph Lachman; December 24, 1955 (age 70); Bayonne, New Jersey, U.S.
- Genres: Alternative rock, new wave
- Occupations: Writer, musician
- Instruments: Bass, guitar
- Years active: 1975–present
- Labels: Chrysalis/EMI Records; Beyond/BMG Records; SBMG Records; Beat Records
- Website: gary-lachman.com

Gary Joseph Lachman (born December 24, 1955), also known as Gary Valentine, is an American writer and musician. He came to prominence in the mid-1970s as the bass guitarist for rock band Blondie. Since the 1990s, Lachman has written full-time, often about mysticism and occultism. He has written several books on consciousness, culture, and the western esoteric tradition and has written for journals in the US and UK.

== Early life ==
Gary Joseph Lachman was born December 24, 1955, in Bayonne, New Jersey, to Lorraine Kochanski and Alfred Lachman. His family was Catholic, and he was christened January 22, 1956. Lachman decided he was no longer Catholic at age 13. In his youth, he was a great fan of comic books, as well as science fiction and horror writers.

He was known in high school for being a poet. When Lachman was 17, he got his girlfriend, who was 16, pregnant; her parents waited for him to turn 18, and then had him arrested for statutory rape. As a result, he left Bayonne and moved to Manhattan, technically a violation of his probation. There, he tried for a time to make a living as a poet.

He later claimed that here he lived in poverty on the streets, saying that he had spent his time "writing some very bad poetry and working as a messenger and starving", and that he "was basically leading a kind of decadent juvenile delinquent life in the East Village". Blondie member Chris Stein rejected this claim and said "Gary never had to starve. He wanted to starve."

== Career ==
=== With Blondie ===
While in Manhattan, Lachman moved into a storefront owned by his schoolmate Clem Burke, a member of the rock band Blondie. In early 1975, after Blondie's original bassist Fred Smith left to join the band Television and amid founding bassist Richard Hell's departure, Burke suggested to Lachman that he could replace Smith as bass player, and Lachman attended an audition where he played piano.

After the audition he was made a member of Blondie. At the time he began playing with them, he did not actually know how to play bass, only some piano and songwriting. He taught himself to play bass, and began to play with the band. He moved into the apartment of Blondie members Debbie Harry and Chris Stein; he still had to report to his probation officer at this time. As part of Blondie, Lachman decided to go by the name Gary Valentine as he thought it more suited to a teen idol; he chose the name in contrast to several of the harsher pseudonyms in use by rockstars of the time.

The band developed its signature sound and style after Lachman joined, spending the next few months playing at New York's CBGB music club. Lachman wrote the music to the band's first single, "X Offender", originally titled "Sex Offender", but retitled to make it more palatable. This mostly failed.

While in Blondie, Lachman began to develop an interest in the occult; Stein and Harry owned several books on the subject, though their interest in it was mostly surface level. Several of his songs written for the band have occult themes. He read Colin Wilson's The Occult in 1975, which he said "changed [his] life". He was fascinated by Aleister Crowley for a time, but soon came to find that path boring.

=== Music career after Blondie ===
In 1977 he left the group to form his own band and was replaced by Nigel Harrison, just as Blondie were starting to gain recognition. He was replaced by Frank Infante. Blondie afterwards recorded a song Lachman wrote, "(I'm Always Touched by Your) Presence, Dear", which was a UK top ten hit in 1978, and was subsequently recorded by Tracey Ullman and Annie Lennox. The song received three gold records. It is about the telepathic connection Lachman believed he had with his then girlfriend Lisa Jane Persky.

After Blondie, Lachman moved to Los Angeles and in 1978 released a few singles, including "I Like Girls" and "The First One" backed with "Tomorrow Belongs to You" on Beat Records. Shortly after this, he formed The Know, with Joel Turrisi and Richard d'Andrea who were the first band to play the infamous Madame Wong's Chinese restaurant-turned-new wave venue. (Lachman's claim to this distinction has been verified by several eyewitnesses.) After a year and a half, Turrisi left the band and was replaced by drummer John McGarvey. In 1980, The Know released a single "I Like Girls" backed with "Dreams" on Planet Records and were the only bi-coastal US power pop band, developing large followings in New York and Los Angeles. Failing to secure an album deal, he disbanded The Know and in 1981 played guitar with Iggy Pop.

=== Writing career and reunion ===
After leaving his music career behind in 1982, aged 26, Lachman went back to school and received a philosophy degree from California State University, Los Angeles, and later began a doctoral program in English literature for a short period. He worked professionally for a time as a science writer for the University of California, Los Angeles.

In 1996, he was asked to participate in the Blondie reunion. In 1997, he performed with Blondie at several major festival concerts in the US. A compilation of Lachman's work in music, titled Tomorrow Belongs to You, featuring recordings by The Know and Fire Escape, was released in 2003 on the UK label Overground Records.

Lachman moved to London in 1996 and became a full-time writer, contributing to The Guardian, Fortean Times, Mojo, Bizarre, Times Literary Supplement The Independent, and other journals. His first book was Two Essays on Colin Wilson: World Rejection and Criminal Romantics and From Outsider to Post-tragic Man, published in 1994 in London by Paupers' Press. He followed this with Colin Wilson as Philosopher, coauthored with John Shand, in 1996. Turn Off Your Mind: The Mystic Sixties and the Dark Side of the Age of Aquarius, was published in 2001. It was followed in 2002 by New York Rocker: My Life in The Blank Generation, an account of his years on the New York and Los Angeles music scene in the 1970s.

In 2006, he was inducted into the Rock and Roll Hall of Fame as a former member of Blondie, although vocalist Debbie Harry prohibited Lachman and other ex-members from performing with the current line-up at the ceremony as they had already rehearsed their set.

The following years saw several more books, on the related themes of consciousness, the counterculture, and the influence of the occult and esoteric thought on mainstream western culture, including biographies of the Russian philosopher P.D. Ouspensky (2004), the Austrian "spiritual scientist" Rudolf Steiner (2007), the Swedish religious thinker Emanuel Swedenborg (2006), the Swiss psychologist Carl Jung (2010) and Colin Wilson (2016). Recent works include a study of writers and suicide, The Dedalus Book of Literary Suicides: Dead Letters (2008), with essays on Walter Benjamin, Yukio Mishima, Hermann Hesse, and others, and a history of occultism and politics, Politics and the Occult: The Right, the Left, and the Radically Unseen (2008), which addresses the theme of fascism and the occult through the work of Julius Evola, Rene Schwaller de Lubicz, Mircea Eliade, and others.

In 2014, Lachman took part in the annual Engelsberg Seminar held in Avesta, Sweden, lecturing on gnosis and the evolution of consciousness in the 21st century. In 2015, Lachman lectured on "Rejected Knowledge" to the Marion Institute as part of their "Living in the Real World" seminar.

== Personal life ==
He was married for a time, but divorced. Lachman has two sons. Lachman says he follows no particular path. Out of the mystical or occultist writers he has researched, he has been most influenced by Colin Wilson, whose thought forms the basis of much of his; he was also influenced by P. D. Ouspensky, and philosophers like Nietzsche. In 2018, he stated in an interview with Folk Horror Revival that he largely no longer enjoyed rock or pop music, now preferring classical.

== Bibliography ==
- —— (1994). Two Essays on Colin Wilson: World Rejection and Criminal Romantics and From Outsider to Post-Tragic Man. Colin Wilson Studies. West Bridgford: Paupers' Press. ISBN 0-946650-53-5.
- Shand, John; —— (1996). Colin Wilson as Philosopher. Colin Wilson Studies. West Bridgford: Paupers' Press. ISBN 0-946650-59-4.
- —— (2001). Turn Off Your Mind: The Mystic Sixties and the Dark Side of the Age of Aquarius. London: Sidgwick & Jackson. ISBN 0-283-06366-1.
- —— (2002). New York Rocker: My Life in the Blank Generation, with Blondie, Iggy Pop and Others, 1974–1981. London: Sidgwick & Jackson. ISBN 0-283-06367-X.
- —— (2003). A Secret History of Consciousness. Great Barrington: Lindisfarne Books. ISBN 1-58420-011-1.
- —— (2003). A Dark Muse: A History of the Occult. New York: Thunder's Mouth Press. ISBN 1-56025-656-7.
- —— (2003). The Dedalus Book of the Occult: The Dark Muse. Sawtry: Dedalus. ISBN 1-903517-20-6.
- ——, ed. (2004). The Dedalus Occult Reader: The Garden of Hermetic Dreams. Sawtry: Dedalus. ISBN 1-903517-32-X.
- —— (2004). In Search of P. D. Ouspensky: The Genius in the Shadow of Gurdjieff. Wheaton: Quest Books. ISBN 0-8356-0840-9.
- —— (2006). Into the Interior: Discovering Swedenborg. London: Swedenborg Society. ISBN 0-85448-149-4.
- —— (2007). Rudolf Steiner: An Introduction to His Life and Work. New York: Jeremy P. Tarcher/Penguin. ISBN 1-58542-543-5.
- —— (2008). The Dedalus Book of Literary Suicides: Dead Letters. Sawtry: Dedalus. ISBN 978-1-903517-66-6.
- —— (2008). Politics and the Occult: The Left, the Right, and the Radically Unseen. Newburyport: Quest Books. ISBN 978-0-8356-0857-2.
- —— (2008). The Dedalus Book of the 1960s: Turn Off Your Mind. Sawtry: Dedalus. ISBN 978-1-903517-70-3.
- —— (2010). Jung The Mystic: The Esoteric Dimensions of Carl Jung's Life and Teachings. New York: Jeremy P. Tarcher/Penguin. ISBN 978-1-58542-792-5.
- —— (2011). The Quest For Hermes Trismegistus: From Ancient Egypt to the Modern World. Edinburgh: Floris Books. ISBN 978-0-86315-798-1.
- —— (2012). Madame Blavatsky: The Mother of Modern Spirituality. New York: Jeremy P. Tarcher/Penguin. ISBN 978-1-58542-863-2.
- —— (2012). Swedenborg: An Introduction to His Life and Ideas. New York: Jeremy P. Tarcher/Penguin. ISBN 978-1-58542-938-7.
- —— (2013). The Caretakers of the Cosmos: Living Responsibly in an Unfinished World. Edinburgh: Floris Books. ISBN 978-178250-002-5.
- —— (2014). Aleister Crowley: Magick, Rock and Roll, and the Wickedest Man in the World. New York: Jeremy P. Tarcher/Penguin. ISBN 978-0-399-16190-2.
- —— (2014). Revolutionaries of the Soul: Reflections on Magicians, Philosophers, and Occultists. Newburyport: Quest Books. ISBN 978-0-8356-0926-5.
- —— (2015). The Secret Teachers of the Western World. New York: Jeremy P. Tarcher/Penguin. ISBN 978-0-399-16680-8.
- —— (2016). Beyond the Robot: The Life and Work of Colin Wilson. New York: TarcherPerigee. ISBN 978-0-399-17308-0.
- —— (2017). Lost Knowledge of the Imagination. Edinburgh: Floris Books. ISBN 978-1-782-50445-0.
- —— (2018). Dark Star Rising: Magick and Power in the Age of Trump. New York: TarcherPerigee. ISBN 978-0-525-50380-4.
- —— (2020). The Return of Holy Russia: Apocalyptic History, Mystical Awakening, and the Struggle for the Soul of the World. Rochester: Inner Traditions. ISBN 978-1-62055810-2.
- —— (2021). Introducing Swedenborg: Correspondences. London: Swedenborg Society. ISBN 978-0-85448-216-0.
- —— (2022). Dreaming Ahead of Time: Experiences with Precognitive Dreams, Synchronicity and Coincidence. La Vergne: Floris Books. ISBN 978-1-78250-796-3.
- —— (2023). Aleister Crowley: The Beast In Britain. London: Herb Lester Associates. ISBN 978-1-73989-717-8.
- —— (2024). Maurice Nicoll: Forgotten Teacher of the Fourth Way. Rochester: Inner Traditions. ISBN 978-1-64411-991-4.
- —— (2024). Facts Concerning H. P. Lovecraft and His Environs. London: Herb Lester Associates. ISBN 978-1-73933-971-5.
- —— (2024). Maigret’s Paris: Walking in the Chief Inspector's Footsteps. London: Herb Lester Associates. ISBN 978-1-73933-975-3.
- —— (2025). Fear City: The New York Underground, 1974-1981. London: Herb Lester Associates. ISBN 978-1-06-852346-5.
- —— (2025). Touched by the Presence: From Blondie's Bowery and Rock and Roll to Magic and the Occult. Rochester: Inner Traditions. ISBN 979-8-8885-0311-9.
