= Beyond the Robot =

2016 book by Gary Lachman

- Author: Gary Lachman
- Language: English
- Subject: Colin Wilson
- Genre: biography
- Publisher: Penguin Putnam
- Publication date: 2016
- Publication place: United States
- Pages: 416
- ISBN: 9780399173080

Beyond the Robot: The Life and Work of Colin Wilson is a 2016 book by the American writer Gary Lachman. It is a biography about the English writer and philosopher Colin Wilson.

Lachman first discovered Wilson when he was a musician in New York City in the 1970s and read Wilson's book The Occult: A History, which became the beginning of his own interest in occult, philosophical and mystical subjects. Relocated to England, Lachman made a career out of writing about such subjects, producing books about people such as Emanuel Swedenborg, Helena Blavatsky, Aleister Crowley, Rudolf Steiner, P. D. Ouspensky and Carl Jung. He remained an admirer of Wilson.

Michael Dirda of The Washington Post described Beyond the Robot as "an enthralling account" of Wilson's life and work, and a good introduction to Lachman's ability to write about his subjects with "exceptional grace, forcefulness and clarity".
