= The Secret Teachers of the Western World =

2015 book by Gary Lachman

- Author: Gary Lachman
- Language: English
- Subject: Western esotericism
- Publisher: TarcherPerigee
- Publication date: December 5, 2015
- Publication place: United States
- Pages: 528
- ISBN: 978-0-399-16680-8

The Secret Teachers of the Western World is a 2015 popular history book by the American writer Gary Lachman. It is about the influence of Western esotericism on mainstream culture and politics since antiquity, and how this influence relates to intuitive and rational thinking.

TarcherPerigee published the book on December 5, 2015. Publishers Weekly called it an "enthralling, complex work" that is "most successful as a thoughtful history of 'rejected knowledge' and its proponents, and on those terms it can be rich and rewarding".
