= Turn Off Your Mind =

2001 book by Gary Lachman

- Author: Gary Lachman
- Language: English
- Publisher: Sidgwick & Jackson
- Publication date: 2001
- Publication place: United Kingdom
- Pages: 430; 546 (revised)
- ISBN: 978-0-283-06366-4

Turn Off Your Mind: The Mystic Sixties and the Dark Side of the Age of Aquarius is a 2001 book by the American writer Gary Lachman. It charts the presence of mystic and occult ideas in the pop culture and counterculture of the 1960s. A revised and expanded version was published in 2009 as The Dedalus Book of the 1960s: Turn Off Your Mind.

== Reception ==
According to Paul Krassner in Los Angeles Times, "Turn Off Your Mind offers an alternative chronicle of what went on in the '60s when, somewhere along the spectrum of expanding consciousness, many hippies collided with a fascination with black magic. But Lachman's book reads more like a list of references that could conceivably serve as an aid in preparing for a stint on 'Occult Jeopardy!'" Krassner found the book to focus too much on the negative sides of the 1960s counterculture. He further wrote that Lachman "resorts to ... mendacious generalizations", "fails to report interesting details", that his "selection of anecdotes isn't without errors" and that there is "a fixation on fascism in the book that taints Lachman's perceptions". Krassner wrote: "I suspect that, unless you are a hard-core enthusiast of occult esoterica, you will find reading this book a chore rather than a pleasure."

The Independent's Christopher Hirst wrote that there is "much in Lachman's book to entertain and inform those who wished they had lived through the Sixties and those who did but can't remember it. If you want to know about, say, beatnik king Brion Gysin, ley-line apostle John Michell and Zen master Alan Watts, this is the place to start."
