= Outsider Cycle =

Series of books by Colin Wilson

- The Outsider; Religion and the Rebel; The Stature of Man; The Strength to Dream; The Origins of the Sexual Impulse; Beyond the Outsider; The New Existentialism
- Author: Colin Wilson
- Country: United Kingdom
- Language: English
- Published: 1956–1966

The Outsider Cycle is a series of books by the English writer Colin Wilson. It begins with Wilson's debut book The Outsider from 1956 and lays out a philosophical programme he called New Existentialism, which was intended to be more life-affirming than previous forms of Existentialist philosophy.

== Description ==
The Outsider Cycle surveys and analyzes creative and nonconformist people and lays out a philosophical programme Wilson called New Existentialism. The series receives its name from The Outsider, which was Wilson's debut book and temporarily launched him to literary stardom in 1956. Wilson kept publishing various books and declared the books of the Outsider Cycle as a series in the introduction to the sixth entry, Beyond the Outsider, in 1965. Wilson's The New Existentialism from 1966 is a summary of the series' philosophical programme and sometimes counted as a seventh entry. Wilson envisioned his New Existentialism as a more life-affirming answer to how both Romanticism and early 20th-century Existentialism had handled a modern view of meaning and knowledge, which since Isaac Newton's Philosophiæ Naturalis Principia Mathematica had been treated as things humans create and seek out for themselves.

== Books ==
- The Outsider (1956)
- Religion and the Rebel (1957)
- The Stature of Man (1959)
- The Strength to Dream: Literature and the Imagination (1962)
- The Origins of the Sexual Impulse (1963)
- Beyond the Outsider (1965)
- The New Existentialism (1966)
