= Dark Star Rising =

2018 book by Gary Lachman

- Author: Gary Lachman
- Language: English
- Publisher: TarcherPerigee
- Publication date: 2018
- Publication place: United States
- Pages: 256
- ISBN: 978-0-14-313206-6
- Preceded by: The Lost Knowledge of the Imagination

Dark Star Rising: Magick and Power in the Age of Trump is a 2018 book by the American writer Gary Lachman. It explores the influence of occult figures on the alt-right movement in the United States, and their use of internet memes and chaos magick in the rise of Donald Trump to the presidency. Lachman draws a direct line between occult and far right figures like philosopher Julius Evola, Steve Bannon, and Aleksandr Dugin, while showing how the New Thought religious movement and people like Norman Vincent Peale shaped who Trump became, leaving a post-truth reality in its wake.

== Reception ==
Mark Frauenfelder reviewed the book for Boing Boing, writing that it was informative and educational on the subject of the occult, the New Thought movement, and the relationship between occult fascism and the alt-right. Frauenfelder commended Lachman for his scholarship and "encyclopedic knowledge", and for his skill in breaking down a convoluted history of occultism in simple terms. He also applauded Lachman for not "ascribing any kind of paranormal efficacy to occult practices" and for showing the consequences of these ideas when they are relied upon in reality.

Writer and occultist Ralph Tegtmeier positively reviewed the book for Paralibrum, giving it a lengthy, in-depth analysis. Tegtmeier observes that Dark Star Rising is unlike Lachman's previous books on occult ideas, as it focuses on the subject of the occult, far-right American politics, and Donald Trump, whom Tegtmeier notes is, by itself, a difficult figure to write about. Tegtmeier congratulates Lachman for steering away from personal attacks on Trump, and for taking a strictly "phenomenological" approach to the topic. He notes that Lachman's investigation of Aleksandr Dugin's connection to the alt-right is timely and of great interest to readers. On the other hand, Tegtmeier does take issue with Lachman's reductionist description of chaos magick, writing that the specific claims showing chaos magick was used to get Trump elected is somewhat, admittedly weak. Nevertheless, Tegtmeier agrees with Lachman that he "has a very good point overall, and a pretty convincing if disturbing one", as there are too many similarities that are "too striking and well-documented to be frivolously discounted". Tegtmeier summarizes the book as an important one, calling it "a roller coaster ride across the unsavoury theme park of American, Russian and, to a lesser extent, global right-wing, authoritarian and neo-fascist politics".

In a review for the Fortean Times, S. D. Tucker gave the book five out of five stars, noting the quality of its composition, research and interest. Tucker disagreed with Lachman on placing all the blame at Trump's feet as the "ultimate source of post-truth chaos in himself", noting that "rejections of demonstrable physical reality" were also found in previous administrations, even ones run by the Democratic Party, as "competing versions" of reality waged war with each other throughout the political spectrum.
