= Misfit =

Misfit may refer to:

== Film, books, and television ==
- "Misfit" (short story), a 1939 short story by Robert A. Heinlein
- The Misfit, a character in Flannery O'Connor's short story "A Good Man Is Hard to Find"
- Misfit (1965 film), a 1965 American film
- The Misfit (TV series), a 1970s ATV sitcom series
- Salah Asuhan (film), a 1972 Indonesian film released internationally as The Misfit
- Misfit (2017 film), a 2017 Dutch film

== Music ==
- Misfit (songwriter), Korean lyricist at S.M. Entertainment
- "Misfit" (Amy Studt song), 2003
- "Misfit" (Curiosity Killed the Cat song), 1986
- "Misfit", 1974 song by Carly Simon from Hotcakes
- "Misfit", song by Elefant from Sunlight Makes Me Paranoid
- "Misfit", 1980 song by Wipers from their album Is This Real?
- Misfit, a rapper in the hip hop group Rascalz

== Other uses ==
- Misfit (DC Comics), comic book character
- Misfit (Marvel Comics), comic book character
- Misfit Studios, a Canadian small press publishing company
- Misfit Wearables, a wearable sensor technology design and manufacturing company

== See also ==
- Misfit (comics), a list of comics that share the name
- Misfits (disambiguation)
