= John Grover (film editor) =

British film editor (1938–2026)

- Born: John Clifford Grover; 24 October 1938; Barnet, Middlesex, England
- Died: September 28, 2026 (aged 87); Buckinghamshire, England
- Occupation: Film editor
- Years active: 1961–2005

John Clifford Grover (24 October 1938 – 28 September 2026) was a British film editor. He was best known for his film editing work on a variety of films through a four decade career.

Grover worked uncredited as an assistant editor on David Lean's Doctor Zhivago and Stanley Kubrick's 2001: A Space Odyssey; along with Ray Lovejoy. Other films he edited include the Roger Moore films The Wild Geese and The Sea Wolves, as well as Tobe Hooper's Lifeforce and Jim Henson's Labyrinth. He worked on a total of six James Bond films in the 1970s and 1980s, including as the film editor on For Your Eyes Only, The Living Daylights and License to Kill, and other editing work on The Spy Who Loved Me, Moonraker and Octopussy.

Grover died at his home in Buckinghamshire on 28 September 2026, aged 87.
