= Lionel Blue =

British rabbi and broadcaster

Rabbi Lionel Blue OBE
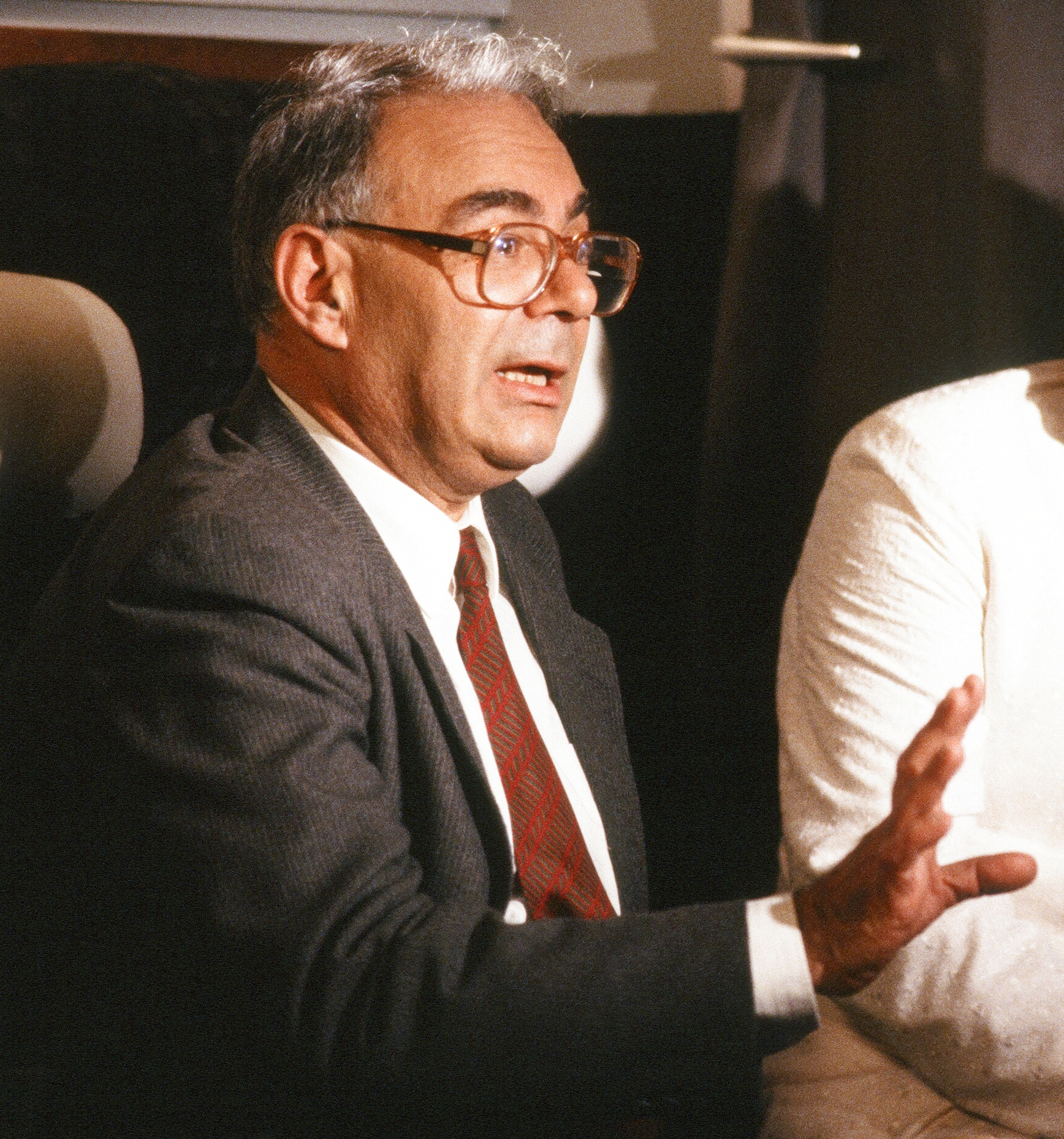
- Appearing on Channel 4 in 1988 in John Wells and the Three Wise Men (Open Media)

Personal life
- Born: 6 February 1930 London, England
- Died: 19 December 2016 (aged 86) London, England
- Spouse: Jim Cummings (partner, 1981–d. 2014)
- Education: Balliol College, Oxford; University College London; Leo Baeck College
- Occupation: Rabbi

Religious life
- Religion: Judaism
- Denomination: Reform Judaism

Jewish leader
- Residence: London

Lionel Blue OBE (né Bluestein; 6 February 1930 – 19 December 2016) was a British Reform rabbi, journalist and broadcaster, described by The Guardian as "one of the most respected religious figures in the UK". He was best known for his longstanding work with the media, most notably his wry and gentle sense of humour on Thought for the Day on BBC Radio 4's Today programme. He was the first British rabbi publicly to declare his homosexuality.

== Career ==
Blue was born in the East End of London in 1930. His parents were Jews of Russian origin and his father worked as a tailor. Blue did not receive a religious education, declaring that he lost his religious faith at the age of five after a petitionary prayer failed to remove Adolf Hitler and Oswald Mosley. Instead, Blue became interested in Marxism. He entered Hendon County School at sixth form level, following education in the East End and a year out of school at age 16–17. He served in the British Army but was discharged after having a nervous breakdown brought on by anxiety over his closet homosexuality.

Blue read history at Balliol College, Oxford and Semitics at University College London. He regained his faith while at Oxford, when he found some resolution to severe personal conflicts regarding his sexual orientation at a Quaker meeting. He also found Victor Gollancz's A Year of Grace helpful during this time, and finally became one of the first two students at Leo Baeck College for training rabbis in 1956.

Blue was ordained as a rabbi in 1960. Between 1960 and 1963, Blue was the minister of the Settlement Synagogue and Middlesex New Synagogue. He then became the European Director of the World Union for Progressive Judaism. In 1967, he began a long-term engagement as a lecturer at Leo Baeck College in London. He lived in Finchley, north London.

Blue made his first radio broadcast in 1967 and was a regular contributor to BBC Radio 4's Thought for the Day programme for 25 years. He made numerous appearances on BBC Radio 4 and Radio 2, also producing a television programme entitled In Search of Holy England in 1989. In 1978, he collaborated with the author June Rose, on a cookbook, A Taste of Heaven: Adventures in Food & Faith. In 2006, a return trip to his childhood home in London's East End to mark the 350th anniversary of Jewish life in Britain was the subject of an evocative audio slideshow on the BBC News website.

Blue was awarded honorary doctorates from the Open University and Durham University. In 1994, he was appointed an Officer of the Order of the British Empire (OBE).

== Personal life ==
Blue came out in 1980 while he was involved with sailboat designer Kim Holman, a relationship which lasted from 1962 to 1982. He published Godly and Gay in 1981.

After his split with Holman, Blue met Jim Cummings through a personal ad in Gay Times. They remained together until Cummings's death in 2014. He was involved with various gay charities, including the Jewish Gay and Lesbian Group, and Kairos in Soho.

== Illnesses and death ==
Blue was diagnosed with epilepsy at the age of 57; however, he successfully controlled his disorder with medication. During an operation in 1997, a surgeon discovered a tumour which tests proved to be malignant. He received radiotherapy and hormonal treatment to reduce any further growth. He was also diagnosed as having Parkinson's disease. Blue died on 19 December 2016 at the age of 86.

== Books ==
- To Heaven with Scribes and Pharisees (Darton, Longman and Todd,1975) ISBN 0232512892.
- A Backdoor to Heaven (Fount, 1985) ISBN 9780006269786.
- Kitchen Blues (ISIS Large Print, 1986) ISBN 9781850890850.
- Bolts from the Blue (Hodder & Stoughton, 1986) ISBN 9780340413715.
- Simply Divine - with Reverend John Eley (British Broadcasting Corporation, 1986) ISBN 9780563204596.
- Bedside Manna (Victor Gollancz, 1991) ISBN 9780575054417.
- Tales of Body and Soul (Coronet, 1995) ISBN 9780340649558.
- My Affair with Christianity (Hodder & Stoughton General, 1999) ISBN 9780340669075.
- Sun, Sand and Soul (Hodder & Stoughton General, 1999) ISBN 9780340669273.
- Kindred Spirits (Fount, 1999) ISBN 9780006278191.
- Hitchhiking to Heaven – Autobiography (Hodder & Stoughton General, 2004) ISBN 9780340786611.
- Best of Blue (Continuum, 2006) ISBN 9780826490452.
- The Godseeker's Guide (Continuum, 2010) ISBN 9781847064189.
