= Fredrick William Holiday =

- Born: Frederick William Holiday; 1921; Stockport, Cheshire, England
- Died: 1979 (aged 58–59); Haverfordwest, Pembrokeshire, Wales
- Other name: Ted Holiday
- Occupations: Journalist; Cryptozoologist
- Organization: Loch Ness Investigation Bureau

Frederick "Ted" William Holiday (1921–1979) was an English journalist, who wrote books about angling and also the Loch Ness monster, developing a hypothesis about its nature.

His interest began in 1933 with the publication of the Hugh Gray photograph in newspapers, becoming a lifelong passion. From 1939 to 1946 he served in the RAF. In August 1962 he made his first one-man expedition trying to get photographs of the Loch ness Monster, and in 1963 joined the newly formed Loch Ness Phenomena Investigation Bureau.

After several hundred hours of watching the Loch, Holiday claims that he reported four unidentified sightings. In his 1968 book, The Great Orm of Loch Ness, Holiday postulated that the creature in the Loch was an invertebrate creature similar in form to the extinct Tullimonstrum gregarium, but vastly larger.

Holiday also claimed that he noticed several unusual coincidences, including camera malfunction during certain Nessie sightings. For example, in August 1968, even though there were several witnesses along the shore, "Nessie" chose to appear in one of the very few places that were obscured from the various cameras. Holiday reported, "The observers were watchful and keen but they had seen nothing. The phenomenon had concealed itself so there was nothing for them to see."

By 1972, Holiday modified his initial hypothesis that the Loch Ness monster was a literal physical animal. In his second book, The Dragon and the Disc, Holiday postulates that there are certain commonalities between paranormal phenomena and certain reported sightings on the Loch. Holiday also believed that there is a relationship between ancient dragon legends and contemporary UFO phenomena. Though he maintained in the book that he still believed that the monster was an invertebrate animal, there was a paranormal aspect to it reminiscent of ancient Water Horse legends which he could not fully explain.

His final work, The Goblin Universe, was published posthumously and includes an introduction by Colin Wilson.

== Books ==
- Sea Trout: How to Catch Them (1956)
- River-fishing for Sea Trout (1960)
- Angling in Wales (1960)
- Fishing in Wales (1964)
- Feathering for Seafish (1966)
- The Great Orm of Loch Ness: A Practical Inquiry into the Nature and Habits of Water-monsters (1968)
- The Dragon and the Disc: An Investigation into the Totally Fantastic (1973)
  - also published as Creatures from the Inner Sphere (1973)
  - republished as Serpents of the Sky, Dragons of the Earth (1993), ISBN 1-881852-07-5
- Estuary Fishing (1974), ISBN 0-214-20041-8
- The Dyfed Enigma: Unidentified Flying Objects in West Wales, co-authored with Randall Jones Pugh (1979), ISBN 0-571-11412-1
- The Goblin Universe, co-authored with Colin Wilson (1986), ISBN 0-87542-310-8
  - 2nd ed. by Holiday (1990), ISBN 1-85480-081-7
