= Misfit (comics) =

Misfit, in comics, may refer to:

- Misfit (Marvel Comics), a male supervillain.
- Misfit (DC Comics), a female vigilante.

== See also ==
- Misfit (disambiguation)
