= From Atlantis to the Sphinx =

Pseudohistory book by Colin Wilson

From Atlantis To The Sphinx
- Cover of the first edition
- Author: Colin Wilson
- Language: English
- Subject: Great Sphinx of Giza
- Publisher: Virgin Books
- Publication date: 1996
- Publication place: United Kingdom
- Media type: Print (Hardcover and Paperback)
- Pages: 294
- ISBN: 1-85227-526-X
- OCLC: 35205669

From Atlantis to the Sphinx: Recovering the Lost Wisdom of the Ancient World is a 1996 book about the Great Sphinx of Giza by British author Colin Wilson. Wilson proposes that the Sphinx was constructed by a technologically advanced people "nearly 10,000 years before Egyptologists have hypothesized" by the same people who provided plans for the construction of the pyramids of Egypt, Central and South America.

== Summary ==
The book explores the connection between astronomy and mythology, arguing that ancient man used "Lunar knowledge" (intuition) as opposed to modern man's "Solar knowledge" (logic) to interpret the universe and therefore possessed an entirely different but equally valid mentality from that of modern man. Wilson proposes that the outlook of ancient man was based on "seeing the big picture" rather than logically breaking down the universe into its constituent parts.

Wilson develops this idea of civilizations founded on Lunar Knowledge together with astronomy to explain the monumental and seemingly spontaneous achievements of ancient cultures such as the Pyramid Complex at Giza in Egypt.

Wilson argues that the essential weakness of James George Frazer's The Golden Bough is that Frazer attributed the fundamental mythological systems to the beginnings of the farming cultures, specifically to fertility. Agreeing with the philosopher Giorgio de Santillana's thesis developed in Hamlet's Mill (1969), Wilson places the genesis of mythology previous to fertility cultures, linking the fundamental myths to astronomical occurrences such as the Precession of the Equinoxes.

The main observations drawn by Wilson are that our ancient pre-Homo sapiens ancestors possessed intelligence equal to that of modern man, their apparent lack of technological achievement being explained by the needlessness of it based on their completely different, intuitive and all-embracing mentality. Over time, a more logical and dissecting mentality evolved leading to the traits that mark modern civilizations.

== Reception ==
Atlantis and the Sphinx received a mixed review from Norman Malwitz in Library Journal. The book was also reviewed by John Michell in The Spectator.

Malwitz described Wilson's thesis as "unusual", but credited Wilson with presenting his theories in "a sober and readable manner." He considered Wilson's claim that the Sphinx shows signs of water damage and is much older than has been thought to be his most interesting and believable statement. He compared the book to John Anthony West's Serpent in the Sky (1979).
