= June Rose =

- Born: 20 June 1926; Bedford, England, UK
- Died: 10 January 2018 (aged 91)
- Known for: Biographer and Journalist

June Rose (20 June 1926 – 10 January 2018) was a British biographer whose subjects ranged from the Italian artist Modigliani to notable women such as Elizabeth Fry and Marie Stopes.

== Early life ==
June Rose was born in Bedford in 1926, the fourth of five children. Her father was Benjamin Rose, who established the Rose Stores clothing shops. She attended the South Hampstead primary school in London, and the Warren School in Worthing, West Sussex.

== Career ==
Rose worked for a succession of newspapers, starting in 1946 at the Time-Life bureau in London, followed by work with The Irish Press in Dublin and for The Jerusalem Post in Israel. By the early 1960s she returned to London, working for The Jewish Chronicle, and contributing to The Times and BBC radio.

Her first book was a monograph of John Leech, the Punch illustrator.

Rose wrote a biography of Marie Stopes, Marie Stopes and the Sexual Revolution. The life of Dr. James Miranda Barry was the subject of another of her books and explored why a woman took on the identity of a man to succeed in the Victorian era.

Another biography by Rose was of Suzanne Valadon, the painter and mother of Maurice Utrillo, followed by a biography of the 20th-century sculptor Jacob Epstein. In 1978, she collaborated with Rabbi Lionel Blue on a cookbook entitled A Taste of Heaven: Adventures in Food & Faith.

Rose also wrote a history of Barnardo's, a British charity caring for vulnerable children. The book was written after being given access to the organisation's archives. Her history of the Royal National Institute for the Blind, Changing Focus: The Development of Blind Welfare in Britain, was written to celebrate the 100th anniversary of this major British charity.
