= James Barry (surgeon) =

Irish military surgeon (c. 1789–1865)

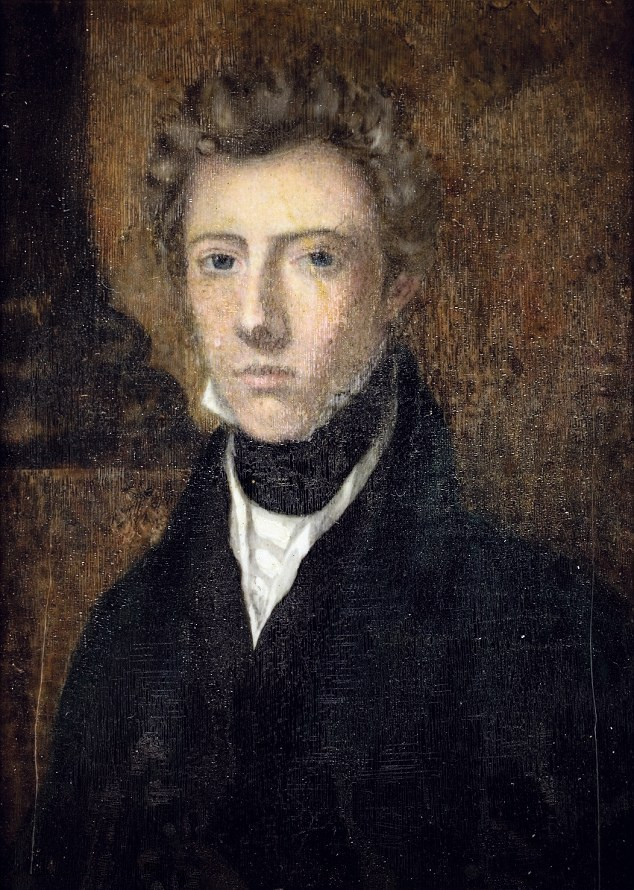
- Portrait claimed to be of Barry, c. 1820s
- Born: Margaret Anne Bulkley c. 1789 (Note: Various sources give birth dates of 1792, 1795, and 1799, but these other dates are almost certainly the result of Barry later lying about age on official documents to aid passing as a man.); Cork, Ireland
- Died: 25 July 1865 (aged 75–76); London, England
- Other name: James Miranda Steuart Barry (Note: Despite Barry being frequently referred to nowadays as James Miranda Barry, or James Miranda Steuart Barry (even by some biographers), there is no evidence he actually ever used either name. The earliest known use of "James Miranda Barry" to refer to him is found in The Perfect Gentleman: The Remarkable Life of Dr James Miranda Barry, the Woman who Served as an Officer in the British Army from 1813 to 1859, by June Rose, publ. 1977.)
- Education: University of Edinburgh Medical School
- Occupation: Surgeon
- Relatives: James Barry (uncle)

James Barry (born Margaret Anne Bulkley, or Bulkeley; c. 1789 – 25 July 1865) was a military surgeon in the British Army. Originally from the city of Cork in Ireland, Barry obtained a medical degree from the University of Edinburgh Medical School, then served first in Cape Town, South Africa, and subsequently in many parts of the British Empire. Before retirement, Barry had risen to the rank of Inspector General (equivalent to Brigadier) in charge of military hospitals, the second-highest medical office in the British Army. He (Note: This article uses he/him pronouns to refer to Barry because they are the pronouns he used at the time of his death.) improved conditions not only for wounded soldiers, but also for the native inhabitants. Barry performed the first recorded caesarean section by a European in Africa in which both the mother and child survived the surgery.

Barry, who lived his entire adult life as a man, was named Margaret Anne at birth and was known as female in childhood. Barry lived as a man in both public and private life, at least in part, in order to be accepted as a university student, and to pursue a career as a surgeon. His gender became known to the public and to military colleagues only after his death.

== Early life ==
James Barry (born Margaret Anne Bulkley), was born in Cork around 1789, (Note: In a letter dated 14 January 1805, Mary Bulkley described Barry as being fifteen years old, so he was presumably born between January 1789 and January 1790. Other sources give birth dates of 1792, 1795, and 1799, but Barry may have supplied false birth dates on official documents to support his identity.) as the second child of Jeremiah and Mary Anne Bulkley. His mother, Mary Anne Bulkley was the sister of James Barry RA, a celebrated Irish artist and professor of painting at London's Royal Academy. His father, Jeremiah Bulkley ran the weigh house in Merchant's Quay, Cork, but anti-Catholic sentiment led to him being fired. This and subsequent financial mismanagement left Mary Anne and Barry without the financial support of either Jeremiah (whose debts left him in the Marshalsea debtors' prison in Dublin) or the Bulkleys' first son John.

In 1803, a third child appeared in their household, Julianna Bulkley. Historians Michael du Preez and Jeremy Dronfield speculate that Juliana was Barry's daughter, borne as a result of childhood rape. No evidence supports this theory, aside from stretch marks on Barry's body indicating a possible past pregnancy, and various circumstances make it unlikely. Around that time, Barry's father ejected his wife and child from their home, and later wrote to his wife that he had "made up [his] mind to forgive". Ann Heilmann disputes this, noting that many fictional and non-fiction accounts present Barry's alleged pregnancy as affirmation of his womanhood; she offers the alternate explanation that Julianna was the daughter of an affair by Barry's mother.

In 1804, Barry (aged about fifteen) and his mother left Ireland for London to apply for help from her brother, the artist James Barry RA. He rejected her request, having been estranged from her for more than thirty years. However, the inheritance from his death in 1806, as well as assistance from some of his former friends, allowed Mrs. Bulkley and her son a degree of comfort.

The teenaged Barry was educated with the prospect of becoming a tutor, but with no work history, he struggled to find positions. Barry, his mother, and her late brother's influential, liberal-minded friends (General Francisco de Miranda, Edward Fryer who had become the young Barry's personal tutor, and Daniel Reardon, the family's solicitor) appeared to form a plan to enable Barry to study medicine at the University of Edinburgh. Barry and his mother departed aboard a Leith smack on 30 November 1809.

From then on, he was known as James Barry, nephew of the late James Barry RA, and remained so for the next 56 years. In a letter to Daniel Reardon sent 14 December 1809, Barry asked for any letters addressed to Margaret Bulkley to be forwarded to Mary Anne Bulkley (who Barry now calls "my aunt"), writing "it was very useful for Mrs Bulkley (my aunt) to have a Gentleman to take care of her on Board Ship and to have one in a strange country." Though signed "James Barry", Reardon wrote on the back of the envelope "Miss Bulkley, 14 December"; this crucial piece of evidence was the one which enabled researchers to confirm Barry's past identity.

Arriving in Edinburgh in November 1809, Barry entered the Medical School as student of literature and medicine. His stature, voice, and smooth skin led many to suspect that he was a pre-pubescent boy, and the University Senate initially attempted to block Barry's application for the final examinations due to his apparent youth. However, the Earl of Buchan, a friend of Fryer and Barry's late namesake, persuaded the Senate to relent and Barry qualified Medicinae Doctor (MD) in 1812, writing his thesis on femoral hernia. He then moved to London, signing up for the Autumn Course 1812/1813 as a pupil of the United Hospitals of Guy's and St Thomas'. His teachers included Henry Cline and celebrated surgeon Astley Cooper. On 2 July 1813, he successfully passed the examination of the Royal College of Surgeons of England.

== Career ==
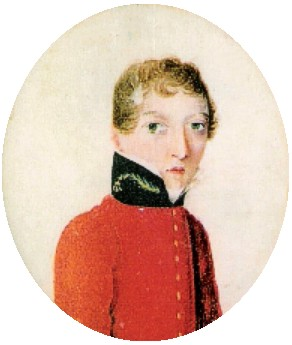
Portrait of James Barry, painted c. 1813–1816

Upon joining the army, Barry was commissioned as a Hospital Assistant in the British Army on 6 July 1813, taking up posts in Chelsea and then the Royal Military Hospital in Plymouth, achieving a promotion to Assistant Surgeon to the Forces, equivalent to lieutenant, on 7 December 1815.

Following this military training, Barry was posted to Cape Town, South Africa, in 1816. Through Lord Buchan, he had a letter of introduction to the Governor, Lieutenant General Lord Charles Somerset. Following the successful, even spectacular, treatment of Lord Charles's sick daughter, he was welcomed into the family, maintained a close friendship with the Governor, and became his personal physician. In 1822 Somerset appointed him as Colonial Medical Inspector, an extraordinary jump in expectations from Barry's low military rank, which brought with it great responsibility. Over ten years of work in the Cape, he effected significant changes, among them improvements to sanitation and water systems, improved conditions for enslaved people, prisoners and the mentally ill, and provision of a sanctuary for the leper population. He also performed one of the first known successful Caesarean sections in which both mother and child survived; the child was christened James Barry Munnik in his honour, and the name was passed down through the family, leading to Barry's name being borne by a later Prime Minister of South Africa, J. B. M. Hertzog. Barry also gained enemies by criticising local officials and their handling of medical matters, but the advantage of a close relationship with the Governor meant that the repercussions of these outspoken views were usually smoothed over.

Barry was promoted to Surgeon to the Forces on 22 November 1827. His subsequent posting was to Mauritius in 1828. In 1829, he risked a great deal of trouble by going absent without leave to return to England and treat Lord Charles Somerset, who had fallen ill, and remained there until Lord Charles' death in 1831. His subsequent posting was to Jamaica, and then the island of Saint Helena in 1836. At St Helena, one clash with a fellow army surgeon resulted in him being arrested and court-martialled on a charge of "conduct unbecoming of the character of an Officer and a Gentleman". He was found not guilty, and honourably acquitted.

In 1840, Barry was posted to the Leeward Islands and Windward Islands of the West Indies, there focusing on medicine, management and improving the conditions of the troops, and receiving a promotion to Principal Medical Officer. In 1845, he contracted yellow fever and left for England on sick leave in October. After being cleared for duty, he was posted to Malta in 1846. Here he was severely reprimanded for inexplicably taking a seat in the local church that was reserved for the clergy. He also had to deal with the threat – and eventual actuality – of a cholera epidemic, which broke out in 1850.

The following posting was to Corfu in 1851, which brought with it a promotion to the rank of Deputy Inspector-General of Hospitals on 16 May, equivalent to lieutenant colonel. In 1857 Barry was posted to Canada, and granted the local rank of Inspector General of Hospitals (equivalent to Brigadier General) on 25 September. In that position, he fought for better food, sanitation and proper medical care for prisoners and lepers, as well as soldiers and their families. This local rank was confirmed as substantive on 7 December 1858.

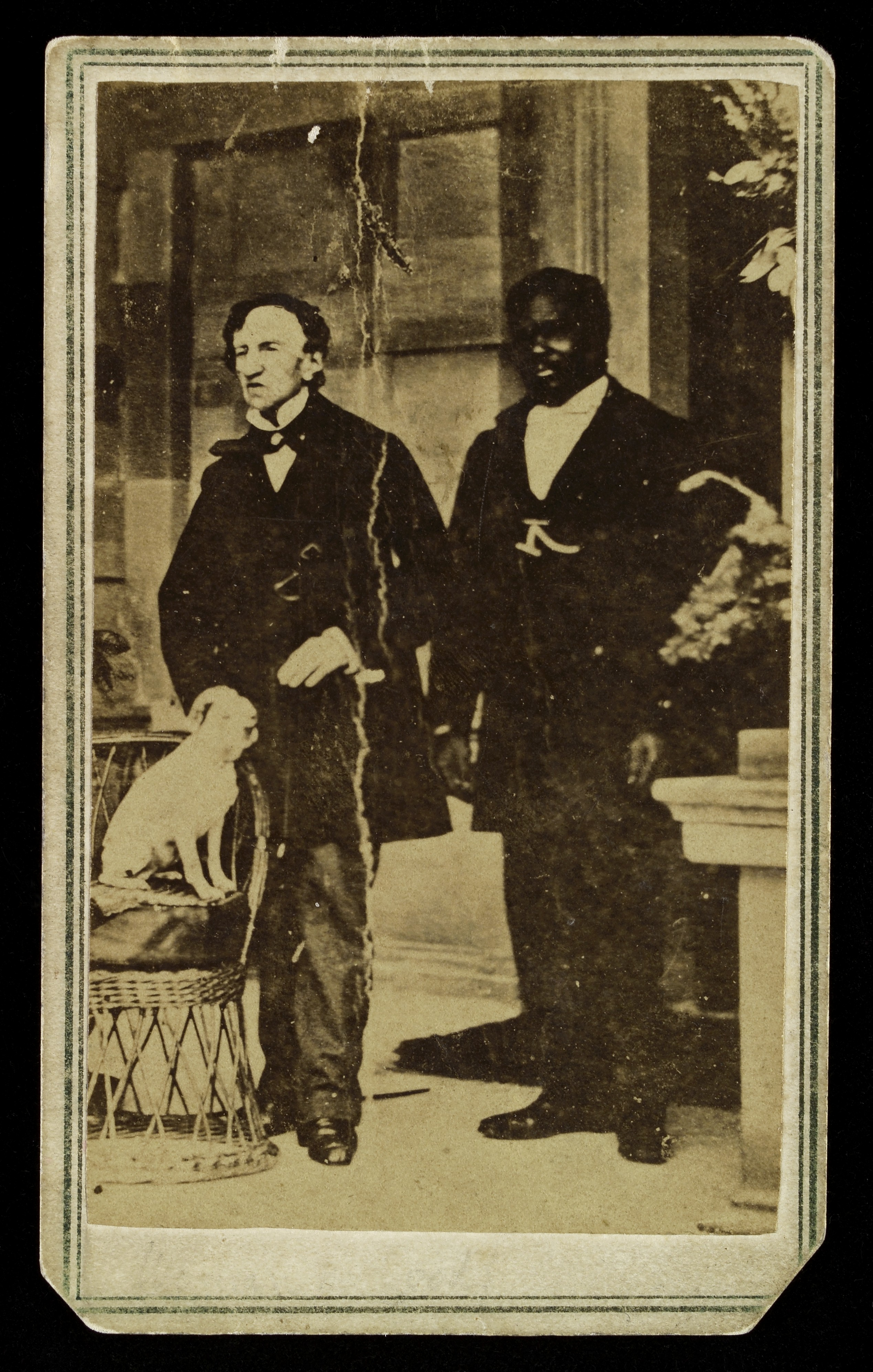
Barry (left) with John, a servant, and Barry's dog, Psyche, c. 1862, Jamaica

Wherever Barry served across the British Empire, improvements were made to sanitary conditions and the conditions and diet of both the common soldier and other under-represented groups. He was outraged by unnecessary suffering, and took a heavy-handed and sometimes tactless approach to demanding improvements for the poor and underprivileged which often incited anger from officials and military officers; on several occasions he was both arrested and demoted for the extremity of this behaviour. He held strict views about nutrition, being completely vegetarian and teetotal, and, while keeping most personal relationships distant, was very fond of pets, particularly a beloved poodle named Psyche. The name of the black servant Barry first employed in South Africa and who remained with him until his death is not precisely known, although a fictionalized account of Barry's life calls him "Black John". Playwright Jean Binnie's radio play Doctor Barry (BBC, 1982) identified him as John Joseph Danson.

== Death ==
Despite protesting against the decision, Barry was forcefully retired by the army on 19 July 1859 because of ill health and old age, and was succeeded as inspector general of hospitals by David Dumbreck. After a quiet retirement in London, Barry died from dysentery on 25 July 1865. The identity of the woman who discovered the truth of his physical sex is disputed, but she was probably a charwoman who also laid out the dead. The charwoman, after failing to elicit payment for her services, sought redress in another way; she visited Barry's physician, Major D. R. McKinnon, who had issued the death certificate upon which Barry was identified as male. The woman claimed that his body had been biologically female and had marks suggesting he had at one point borne a child. However, no professional examination was carried out which could have confirmed these points beyond doubt. When McKinnon refused to pay her, she took the story to the press, and the situation became public. It was discussed in an exchange of letters between George Graham of the General Register Office, and McKinnon.

Sir,

It has been stated to me that Inspector General Dr James Barry, who died at 14 Margaret St on 25th July 1865, was after his death found to be a Female.

As you furnished the Certificate as to the cause of his death, I take the liberty of asking you whether what I have heard is true, and whether you yourself ascertained that he was a woman and apparently had been a Mother?

Perhaps you may decline answering these questions; but I ask them not for publication but for my own information.

I have the honor to be

Sir

Your faithful Servant

George Graham

Registrar General

McKinnon's response was as follows:

Sir

I beg to acknowledge the receipt of your letter of the 23rd August respecting the death of Inspector General Dr James Barry.

I had been intimately acquainted with that gentleman for a good many years, both in the West Indies, & in England, and I never had any suspicion that Dr Barry was a female.

I attended him during his last illness, and for some months previously for bronchitis; the affection causing his death was diarrhoea produced apparently by errors in diet.

On one occasion after Dr Barry's death, I was sent for to the office of Sir Charles McGregor, & there the woman who performed the last offices for Dr Barry was waiting to speak to me.

She wished to obtain some perquisites of her employment which the Lady who kept the lodging house in which Dr Barry died had refused to give her.

Amongst other things she said Dr Barry was a female & that I was a pretty doctor not to know this & that she would not like to be attended by me. I informed her that it was none of my business whether Dr Barry was a male or a female – that I thought it as likely he might be neither, viz. an imperfectly developed man.

She then said that she had examined the body & that it was a perfect female & farther that there were marks of her having had a child when very young. I then enquired how have you formed this conclusion? The Woman pointing to the lower part of her stomach, said from marks here. I am a married woman, & the mother of nine children & I ought to know.

The woman seemed to me to think that she had become acquainted with a great secret & wished to be paid for keeping it, I informed her that all Dr Barry's relatives were dead, & that it was no secret of mine, & that my own impression was that Dr Barry was a Hermaphrodite.

But whether Dr Barry was male, female, or hermaphrodite I do not know, nor had I any purpose in making the discovery as I could positively swear to the identity of the body as being that of a person whom I had been acquainted with as Inspector General of Hospitals for a period of eight or nine years.

I have the honour to be

Sir

Yours faithfully

Signed,

D R McKinnon

After the matter was made public, some people claimed to have known of it all along, although many who had known him expressed surprise or even disbelief. The British Army, seeking to suppress the story, sealed Barry's service records for the next 100 years. The historian Isobel Rae gained access to the army records in the 1950s, and concluded that the painter James Barry was indeed Barry's uncle. Barry was buried in Kensal Green Cemetery, with a Portland stone headstone inscribed Dr James Barry Inspector General of Hospitals. It was claimed by several sources that "John", the manservant who always attended Barry, returned to Jamaica, but his actual fate is unknown.

== Gender and personal life ==
In a letter chiding John Bulkley, Barry's older brother, for abandoning legal studies for the military, 19-year-old Barry wrote: "Was I not a girl I would be a Soldier!"

Rachel Holmes notes in her biography of Barry that Mary Anne Bulkley, in all her complaints to her brother about her child's precarious future, never once raised the question of marriage – even though a good match was then quite vital for a woman's financial security. Holmes suggests this could mean Mrs Bulkley was aware of "some defect in her daughter that made marriage an impossibility".

Barry's interest in medicine was probably encouraged by the liberal-minded friends of the late James Barry RA, and just before travelling to Edinburgh to enroll as a medical student in 1809, he assumed a male identity. His short stature, slight build, unbroken voice, delicate features and smooth skin led others to suspect that he was not a man but a pre-pubescent boy. This identity was maintained through surgical training and recruitment into the British Army which, at officer rank level, did not then require a medical examination.

During Barry's first posting abroad to Cape Town in South Africa, he became a close friend of the Governor, Lord Charles Somerset, and his family. It has been suggested that Lord Charles discovered his secret and that the relationship was more than friendship. Their closeness led to rumours and ultimately an accusation briefly appearing on a bridge post in Cape Town on 1 June 1824 saying that the writer had "detected Lord Charles buggering Dr Barry", which led to a court trial and investigation, as homosexual activity was at that time illegal. Despite these allegations, if Somerset was aware of Barry's sex, he did not reveal it.

Despite efforts to appear masculine, witness reports comment on Barry's effeminacy and on a somewhat contradictory reputation – he had a reputation for being tactless, impatient, argumentative and opinionated, but was also considered to have had a good bedside manner and famous professional skill. His temper and bravado led to a famous pistol duel with Captain Josias Cloete of the 21st Light Dragoons. Barry's aim was better, the bullet striking Cloete's shako military cap and removing its peak, which dissipated its force.

During the Crimean War (1854–1856), Barry got into an argument with Florence Nightingale. After his death, Nightingale wrote that:

I never had such a blackguard rating in all my life – I who have had more than any woman – from this Barry sitting on (her) (Note: Use of rounded parentheses in original.) horse, while I was crossing the Hospital Square, with only my cap on, in the sun. (He) kept me standing in the midst of quite a crowd of soldiers, commissariat servants, camp followers etc etc, every one of whom behaved like a gentleman, during the scolding I received, while (she) behaved like a brute. After (she) was dead, I was told (he) was a woman. ... I should say (she) was the most hardened creature I ever met.

Barry would never allow anyone into the room while undressing, and repeated a standing instruction that "in the event of his death, strict precautions should be adopted to prevent any examination of his person" and that the body should be "buried in [the] bed sheets without further inspection".

== Intersex controversy ==
Kubba and Young picked up on Major McKinnon's statement that he did not know whether Barry was "male, female, or hermaphrodite" and suggested that it might be more appropriate to say that Barry was "hermaphrodite" [or intersex] rather than "female", and "may have had ambiguous genitalia". These suppositions are based on the premise that "Concealment of one's sex for ... 40 years in the British Army, is simply unbelievable". However, du Preez and Dronfield show how Barry might have been able to conceal this secret from all but a few people, and those who did know did not reveal it while he was alive. N. Turner has commented on Kubba and Young's conclusion that the belief in an intersex condition was based on "vanishingly slim evidence". Holmes also raises the possibility of Barry being intersex, but acknowledges the impossibility of knowing, expressing surprise that this is a problem for so many people. The suggestion that he may have been intersex has been criticised for both biological and social reasons. In a review of Holmes's biography, Loudon firmly rejects the implication that Barry might have been intersex.

Regarding the intersex theory, one biographer wrote, "Dr. Barry couldn't have been a woman, for women and medicine were contradictory terms ... it was still too much to imagine that any female could perform as brilliantly as Dr. Barry had done."

== In popular culture ==
E. Rogers, a frequent writer to The Lancet, advertised his novel A Modern Sphinx (later published as Madeline's Mystery) in 1895 through a series of letters to The Lancet. Barry was a character in this novel.

In 1919, a play entitled Dr. James Barry by Olga Racster and Jessica Grove was performed at the St. James's Theatre, with Sybil Thorndike playing Barry. It received a mixed review in The Observer. Racster & Grove later dedicated their 1932 novel The Journal of Dr. James Barry to Thorndike, for her portrayal of Barry.

South African writer Réné Juta published a novel in 1920 titled The Tavern/Cape Currey about Barry's life.

The story of James Barry is briefly told in Zoya Voskresenskaya's novel Devochka v Burnom More (Girl in the Stormy Sea, 1969), whose action takes place during WWII.

In 1982, BBC Radio 4 first broadcast the 45-minute play Dr Barry by Jean Binnie. It was re-broadcast in 2018.

In Janet Kagan's 1985 Star Trek novel Uhura's Song, the character Dr. Evan Wilson owns a spaceship named the Dr. James Barry.

In 1994, Anna Massey played Barry in an episode of the BBC drama-documentary The Experiment. Barry was compared with Hannah Cullwick, who "was experimented on by Arthur Munby, who believed that women in servile labour could earn a nobility of the soul".

Barry's life is the subject of the 1999 historical novel James Miranda Barry (published in the United States as The Doctor) by Patricia Duncker.

A 2004 play, Whistling Psyche by Sebastian Barry, imagines a meeting between James Barry and Florence Nightingale.

In 2012, the UK folk duo Gilmore and Roberts included a song about Barry called Doctor James on their album The Innocent Left.

In 2016, the TV series Herstory: Ireland's EPIC Women featured Barry as the subject of episode 3 as a part of the Herstory 20/20 Project.

In April 2018, Rachel Weisz said that she was developing a biopic of Barry, and intended to produce and star in it.

In February 2019, E. J. Levy's novel based on Barry, The Cape Doctor, was acquired by Little, Brown and Company. The announcement was met with controversy because Levy refers to Barry as "she" and a "heroine," though Levy has stated that the novel also refers to Barry as "he" and "I". The novel was published in June 2021, and it tells the story of a fictional woman named Margaret Brackley, who becomes Dr. Jonathan Perry, who is based on Barry.

In 2024, Irish musician Wallis Bird collaborated with the German classical quintet Spark to release a single about Barry titled "Dr. James Barry". The song was also included on the subsequent album Visions of Venus.

== See also ==
- Alan L. Hart, a transgender American physician
- Albert Cashier, American Civil War soldier
- Amelio Robles Ávila, a transgender Mexican revolutionary
