= The Tower (Wilson novel) =

1987 novel by Colin Wilson

The Tower is a novel by Colin Wilson published in 1987.

== Plot summary ==
The Tower is a novel in which humankind has been enslaved and driven to outlawry by giant spiders in the far future.

== Reception ==
Dave Langford reviewed The Tower for White Dwarf #88, and stated that "Tower opens with much ostentatious research work about deserts and creepy-crawlies, which in the great tradition of pulp SF ignores the sheer unworkability of giant insects."
