= The Philosopher's Stone (novel) =

1969 novel by Colin Wilson

- First edition
- Author: Colin Wilson
- Language: English
- Publisher: Barker
- Publication date: 1969
- Publication place: United Kingdom
- Pages: 315

The Philosopher's Stone is a 1969 horror novel by the English writer Colin Wilson. It tells the story of two researchers who find a way to reach a higher state of consciousness, which leads to frightening revelations about humanity's distant history. Like Wilson's 1967 novel The Mind Parasites, The Philosopher's Stone uses motifs from H. P. Lovecraft's Cthulhu Mythos.

== Publication history ==
It was first published in the United Kingdom in 1969 by Arthur Barker Limited. A paperback edition was published by Panther Books Ltd in 1974.

== Reception ==
Clifford P. Bendau wrote in Colin Wilson, the Outsider and Beyond from 1979: "The human striving for an inept management of freedom is, once again, the issue in The Philosopher's Stone. ... Like The Mind Parasites, The Philosopher's Stone is a story that is a teaching; but it is also a teaching that is a story. It remains one of Colin Wilson's best novels to date."

In his 1982 book The Novels of Colin Wilson, Nicolas Tredell also made comparisons to The Mind Parasites, and wrote that "The Philosopher's Stone is a much more substantial and, in some ways, more satisfactory novel". He criticized the second part of the novel: "With two higher men on his hands, and a lot of the novel still to go, Wilson tries to show them in action. He runs into difficulties, however. As in The Mind Parasites, the consciousnesses rendered do not seem much like those of higher men. In the earlier novel, however, the battle against the parasites acted as a structuring device; at this stage in The Philosopher's Stone, structure is lacking."
