= Ritual in the Dark =

1960 novel by Colin Wilson

- Author: Colin Wilson
- Language: English
- Publisher: Victor Gollancz Ltd
- Publication date: 1960
- Publication place: United Kingdom
- Pages: 416

Ritual in the Dark is the 1960 debut novel of the English writer Colin Wilson. It follows the young would-be writer Gerard Sorme as he enters a small wealthy social circle in Whitechapel led by the homosexual aesthete Austin Nunne.

The story took inspiration from the Jack the Ripper case. Sorme was loosely based on Wilson at the age of 19 and reflects Wilson's teenage rebellion in his views of other people. Wilson said in 2005: "The point of Ritual is that Gerard thinks he can empathise with Austin, believing (wrongly) that his type of revolt is like his own. Only the sight of a dead woman in the morgue makes him aware of the abyss that exists between his own intellectual rebellion and Austin's sadism." The book originally ended with Sorme having a mystical epiphany, but this turned out to be difficult to write well, so Wilson removed it at the suggestion of the publisher Victor Gollancz.

Time wrote that Wilson should shelve his attempt to become a novelist. Kirkus Reviews wrote about the novel's components, which include murder and existentialist philosophy: "Beyond its echoes of Oscar Wilde, Huysmans, Graham Greene, is the voice of current protest, and, with its subject and its author, this makes a powerful combination—sex and sexuality, perversions".

Wilson wrote two more novels about Sorme: Man Without a Shadow (1963) and The God of the Labyrinth (1970).
