= Religion and the Rebel =

1957 book by Colin Wilson

- Author: Colin Wilson
- Language: English
- Series: Outsider Cycle
- Publisher: Victor Gollancz Ltd
- Publication date: September 1957
- Publication place: United Kingdom
- Pages: 333

Religion and the Rebel is a 1957 book by the English writer Colin Wilson.

== Summary ==
Colin Wilson sets out to describe how Western culture since the Renaissance suffers from a separation between intellect, intuition and body. He examines a number of thinkers who have tried to resolve this from a religious perspective. Those profiled in the book include Jakob Böhme, Blaise Pascal, Emanuel Swedenborg, Søren Kierkegaard, George Bernard Shaw, Ludwig Wittgenstein and Alfred North Whitehead.

== Reception ==
The book was the follow-up to Wilson's 1956 debut work The Outsider, which initially was lauded as a work of genius in the British press, but quickly received a severe backlash due to Wilson's eccentric behaviour and self-praise. This had significant impact on the British reception of Religion and the Rebel. Philip Toynbee of The Observer had first praised The Outsider but distanced himself from it, and called Religion and the Rebel a "vulgarising rubbish bin". Raymond Mortimer of The Sunday Times described it as "half-baked Nietzsche".

Charles J. Rolo of The Atlantic called Religion and the Rebel "a hodgepodge" and wrote that "there is a certain madness" to how Wilson grouped thinkers or even chose to label their work as religious. Kirkus Reviews called it "a semi-discriminate hodgepodge, flamboyant but lucid and sententious, erudite to the point of exhibitionism, painfully egocentric, and somehow interesting".

In 1965, Wilson grouped together The Outsider, Religion and the Rebel and four subsequent books and called them the Outsider Cycle.
