= The Delta (novel) =

1987 novel by Colin Wilson

The Delta is a science fiction novel by English writer Colin Wilson, published in 1987.

== Plot summary ==
The novel's main protagonist, Niall, heads for the Delta to investigate the source of a vital spiritual force which causes insects to grow large.

== Reception ==
David Langford, reviewing The Delta for White Dwarf #100, stated that "The Delta is better than promised by The Tower, but the crudeness of its SF tropes detracts from the more interesting Wilson philosophy."

== Reviews ==
- Review by Jim England (1988) in Vector 142
- Review by Andy Sawyer (1988) in Paperback Inferno, #75
