= The Mammoth Book of True Crime =

1988 two volume anthology by Colin Wilson

- Author: Colin Wilson
- Language: English
- Publisher: Carroll & Graf Publishers
- Publication date: 1988
- ISBN: 1-85487-519-1

The Mammoth Book of True Crime is a two volume anthology by British author Colin Wilson. It was published by Carroll & Graf Publishers, New York, in 1988.

The first volume is divided alphabetically into sections that reflect the various aspects of crime.
