= The Outsider (Wilson book) =

1956 book by Colin Wilson

- Cover of the first US edition
- Author: Colin Wilson
- Language: English
- Series: Outsider Cycle
- Subject: Philosophy
- Publisher: Gollancz (UK); Houghton Mifflin (US)
- Publication date: 1956
- Publication place: United Kingdom
- Media type: Print (hardcover and paperback)
- Pages: 302
- Followed by: Religion and the Rebel

The Outsider is a 1956 book by English writer Colin Wilson.

Through the lives and works of an assortment of writers and other cultural figures – including H. G. Wells (Mind at the End of Its Tether), Franz Kafka, Albert Camus, Jean-Paul Sartre, T. S. Eliot, Ernest Hemingway, Harley Granville-Barker (The Secret Life), Hermann Hesse, T. E. Lawrence, Vincent van Gogh, Vaslav Nijinsky, George Bernard Shaw, William Blake, Friedrich Nietzsche, Fyodor Dostoyevsky and George Gurdjieff – Wilson explores the psyche of the Outsider, his sense of social alienation, his effect on society, and society's effect on him.

On Christmas Day 1954, alone in his room, Wilson sat down on his bed and began to write in his journal. He described his feelings as follows:

It struck me that I was in the position of so many of my favourite characters in fiction: Dostoevsky's Raskolnikov, Rilke's Malte Laurids Brigge, the young writer in Hamsun's Hunger: alone in my room, feeling totally cut off from the rest of society. It was not a position I relished...Yet an inner compulsion had forced me into this position of isolation. I began writing about it in my journal, trying to pin it down. And then, quite suddenly, I saw that I had the makings of a book. I turned to the back of my journal and wrote at the head of the page: 'Notes for a book The Outsider in Literature'..."

The Outsider has been translated into over thirty languages (including Russian and Chinese) and never been out of print since publication day of 28 May 1956. Wilson wrote much of it in the Reading Room of the British Museum, and during this period was, for a time, living in a sleeping bag on Hampstead Heath. He continued to work on it at a furious pace and:

One day I typed out the introduction, and a few pages from the middle, and sent them to Victor Gollancz with a letter giving a synopsis of the book. He replied within two days, saying he would be interested to see the book when completed ...

Gollancz was the head of publishers Victor Gollancz Ltd. Wilson was inspired to send the book to him after he found a copy of the publisher's own book A Year of Grace in a second-hand bookshop, which led him to believe that he had found a sympathetic publisher. Gollancz, who was interested in philosophy, agreed to publish Wilson's book. Initially, Wilson intended to call the book The Pain Threshold; however, Gollancz persuaded Wilson to change the title to The Outsider instead. Gollancz ordered an initial print-run of 5,000 copies for the book. He gave a copy of the manuscript to Edith Sitwell, who called the book "astonishing" and claimed that Wilson would be a "truly great writer".

== Contents ==
The book is structured in order to mirror the Outsider's experience: a sense of dislocation, or of being at odds with society. These are figures like Dostoyevsky's "Underground-Man" who seem to be lost to despair and non-transcendence with no way out.

Characters are then brought to the fore (including the title character from Hermann Hesse's novel Steppenwolf). These are presented as examples of those who have insightful moments of lucidity in which they feel as though things are worthwhile/meaningful amidst their shared, usual, experience of nihilism and gloom. Sartre's Nausea is herein the key text – and the moment when the hero listens to a song in a cafe which momentarily lifts his spirits is the outlook on life to be normalized.

Wilson then engages in some detailed case studies of artists who failed in this task and try to understand their weakness – which is either intellectual, of the body or of the emotions. The final chapter is Wilson's attempt at a "great synthesis" in which he justifies his belief that western philosophy is afflicted with a needless pessimistic fallacy.

== Reception ==
On the 27th May 1956, (a day before publication) Cyril Connolly in The Sunday Times and Philip Toynbee in The Observer both praised The Outsider. Connolly called The Outsider "one of the most remarkable first books I have read for a long time", and Toynbee called it "luminously intelligent". Elizabeth Bowen in the Tatler called Wilson's book "brilliant". However, in June, Kingsley Amis in The Spectator and Burns Singer in Time and Tide both gave negative reviews to The Outsider. In the same month, J. B. Priestley in the New Statesman lauded the writing style of The Outsider, but expressed doubts about the lasting value of Wilson's ideas. On the 13th July, Daniel Farson wrote a sympathetic account of Wilson and his book for the Daily Mail. Farson stated that The Outsider had received "the most rapturous reception of any book since the war." As a result of this largely positive coverage, The Outsider became a bestseller. Harry Ritchie has stated about the initial reception of the book: "the acclaim was so spectacular that Wilson became a national celebrity overnight."

Later reviews of The Outsider were more sceptical. Philosopher A. J. Ayer, writing in Encounter magazine in September 1956, argued that Wilson's book failed to define the essential characteristics of "the Outsider", stating that "he gives us various indications which do not make an entirely coherent picture." Raymond Williams in Essays In Criticism in January 1957, claimed that in The Outsider Wilson treated "his own feelings as if they were self-evident truths."

The book has never been out of print since publication in May 1956 and has been translated into at least thirty languages. Wilson helped to keep the work fresh by adding to it over the years: the 1967 paperback edition included a fifteen-page postscript; a ten-page essay The Outsider, twenty years on was added to the 1978 edition; and in 2001 an index appeared for the first time alongside fifteen pages of postscripts originally written for a Chinese translation. It is still published with enthusiastic comments from the likes of Edith Sitwell and Cyril Connolly adorning its cover. This reception – of his first book at the age of 24 – was a high critical watermark for Wilson which he did not achieve again until the publication of The Occult in 1971, after which he enjoyed a long and fruitful career as a writer, philosopher, novelist, lecturer and broadcaster until his death in 2013.

== Sequels ==
Wilson followed The Outsider with six philosophical titles, which have become known as the Outsider Cycle: Religion and the Rebel (1957), The Age of Defeat (The Stature of Man in the U.S., 1959), The Strength to Dream (1962), Origins of the Sexual Impulse (1963), Beyond the Outsider (1965) and the summary volume Introduction to the New Existentialism (1966). These were accompanied by a string of novels aimed at putting his philosophical ideas into action.

== Cultural references ==
In 1957, Angus Wilson wrote a short story, "A bit off the map", where he satirized Colin Wilson and the ideas that Wilson had put forth in The Outsider.
