= The Mind Parasites =

1967 novel by Colin Wilson

- First UK edition
- Author: Colin Wilson
- Language: English
- Genre: Horror, science fiction
- Published: 1967
- Publisher: Arthur Baker (UK); Arkham House (US)
- Publication place: United States
- Media type: Print (Hardback)
- Pages: xxi, 222

The Mind Parasites is a science fiction horror novel by English author Colin Wilson. It was published by Arkham House in 1967 in an edition of 3,045 copies. It was Wilson's first and only book published by Arkham House.

The book is developed within H. P. Lovecraft's Cthulhu Mythos.

== Publication history ==
In his introduction to The Philosopher's Stone (1969), Wilson explained how he wrote The Mind Parasites at the urging of August Derleth. Wilson had earlier written an essay explaining his admiration for Lovecraft as a thinker or conceptualist, while also expressing a dislike for Lovecraft's prose as ungainly and ponderous. Derleth replied to Wilson, offering a friendly challenge to write a narrative exploring Lovecraft's themes. Wilson took up the challenge, and Derleth published the first American edition of The Philosopher's Stone.

The novel was published earlier in 1967 by Arthur Barker, but with a different introduction. It was then reprinted by Oneiric Press from 1972 to 1975, initially by Michael Besher (also known as Misha PanZobop) and Chellis Glendinning; then by Besher and his brother Alexander Besher. A paperback edition was published in the United Kingdom by Panther Books Ltd in 1969, and sales were successful enough to warrant a 1973 reprint. It was favourably reviewed by William Burroughs in the 19th June 1969 issue of New York underground newspaper ‘The Rat’

In 1994, the first Russian translation of the book was published by a Ukrainian publishing house Sofia, with 20,000 copies printed.

== Plot summary ==
The book is written as a transcription of a series of various recordings, notes, and conversations by Professor Gilbert Austin, an archaeologist focused on ancient human pre-history, taken in the early 20th century (about fifty years after the books publication) after he disappeared in some mysterious fashion. Dr. Austin discovers that invisible mind parasites that he names Tsathogguans, have been menacing the human race for hundreds of years. The Tsathogguans feed on mental energy and prevent people from reaching their full mental and psychic potentials. Using phenomenology, Austin is able to subvert the parasitical drain and acquire a higher level of thinking along with psychic powers such as telekinesis and telepathy. Austin bands together with a group of scientists who fight the parasites on the mental plane. The parasites counter by attacking key people, forcing them to dangerous thoughts and starting wars. Austin discovers that the parasites relate to the moon which was once an extra solar planetoid harboring an alien race. When the aliens died out, they left a psychic imprint on the moon. That imprint irritated human minds, causing the collective human subconscious to build split personalities for every mind. It is these split personalities that are the parasites. The group uses their collective psychic powers to push the moon into the sun, thus allowing humanity to develop further. The narrative ends with Austin taking a rocket out of the solar system. The reader speculates that he had made contact with an alien civilization and was seeking them out.

== Critical reception ==
Reviewing The Mind Parasites for The Magazine of Fantasy & Science Fiction, Joanna Russ gave the book a negative assessment. Russ stated "the Outsider's latest is not in the Lovecraft tradition but in the Boy's Life Gee Whiz tradition, and ought to be called 'Tom Swift and the Tsathogguans.'" Russ said the book would disappoint Lovecraft enthusiasts, and called it "one of the worst books I have ever read and very enjoyable, but then I did not have to pay for it." David Pringle rated The Mind Parasites with one star out of four. Pringle described the novel as a "stilted version" of the traditional science fiction plot of humanity being controlled by invisible entities, and said The Mind Parasites "doesn't live up to the author's reputation gained in other fields."

== Sources ==
- Jaffery, Sheldon (1989). The Arkham House Companion. Mercer Island, WA: Starmont House, Inc. pp. 86–87. ISBN 1-55742-005-X.
- Chalker, Jack L.; Mark Owings (1998). The Science-Fantasy Publishers: A Bibliographic History, 1923-1998. Westminster, MD and Baltimore: Mirage Press, Ltd. p. 44.
- Joshi, S.T. (1999). Sixty Years of Arkham House: A History and Bibliography. Sauk City, WI: Arkham House. p. 99. ISBN 0-87054-176-5.
- Nielsen, Leon (2004). Arkham House Books: A Collector's Guide. Jefferson, NC and London: McFarland & Company, Inc. p. 100. ISBN 0-7864-1785-4.
- Wilson, Colin (1986). The Mind Parasites. Moscow, USSR: Moscow Raduga Publishers. p. 336. ISBN 5-05-001039-X.
