= The Occult: A History =

Book by Colin Wilson

- First edition
- Author: Colin Wilson
- Language: English
- Subject: Occult
- Genre: Non-fiction
- Publisher: Random House
- Publication date: 1971
- Publication place: United States
- Media type: Print
- Pages: 601 pp.
- ISBN: 0-394-71813-5

The Occult: A History is a 1971 nonfiction occult book by English writer Colin Wilson. Topics covered include Aleister Crowley, George Gurdjieff, Helena Blavatsky, Kabbalah, primitive magic, Franz Mesmer, Grigori Rasputin, Daniel Dunglas Home, Paracelsus, P. D. Ouspensky, William Blake, Giacomo Casanova, Heinrich Cornelius Agrippa and various others.

== Contents ==
The Occult: A History is divided into three sections. Part one is entitled "A Survey of the Subject" and covers topics such as "Magic-The Science of the Future". Part two is titled "A History of Magic" and covers occult in history. Part three is called "Man's Latent Powers" and deals with topics such as spiritual entities in the chapter "The Realm of Spirits".

== Reception ==
I had assumed, to begin with, that ghosts were a superstition. Then I discovered that they had been believed in by every civilisation for thousands of years, and began to feel that perhaps my dismissive attitude was a mistake.

— Colin Wilson

Joyce Carol Oates reviewed the book, remarking that it was an "excellent idea" for a book and that it "is one of those rich, strange, perplexing, infinitely surprising works that repay many readings." The Robesonian commented that the book was "vast" and "extremely well researched". A reviewer for the Boca Raton News panned the book, saying that Wilson "expects this "Faculty X" to unite instinct and intelligence, but what this might achieve explicitly, eluded this reviewer throughout the book's 560 minutely detailed pages." In his book Modern Occult Rhetoric Joshua Gunn acknowledged the book's popularity but criticized "Wilson's expressed agenda to prove the existence of psychic and astral forces" as an occasional annoyance that "detracts from the value of his scholarship". Kirkus Reviews praised the history portion of the book while criticizing the other two sections of the book as "the usual pretentious, polymorphous thinking of that paraclete/exegete on what he calls Faculty X".
