= 1960 in literature =

This article contains information about the literary events and publications of 1960.

== Events ==
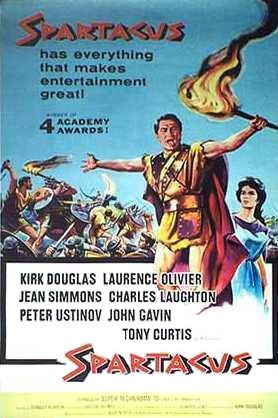
1961 post-Oscars theatrical poster for Spartacus, illustrated by Reynold Brown

- February–October – Astounding magazine is renamed Analog.
- Spring – August Derleth launches the poetry magazine Hawk and Whippoorwill in the United States.
- March 22 – Joan Henry's play Look on Tempests is premièred at the Comedy Theatre in London's West End, as the first play dealing openly with homosexuality to be passed for performance by the Lord Chamberlain in Britain.
- April 27 – Harold Pinter's play The Caretaker is premièred at the Arts Theatre Club in London's West End, transferring to the Duchess Theatre the following month, where it runs for 444 performances before departing from London for Broadway, Pinter's first significant commercial success. Alan Bates and Donald Pleasence star in the original production.
- July 11 – Harper Lee's Southern Gothic Bildungsroman To Kill a Mockingbird is published in the United States. She completes no later novel before her death in 2016.
- August 12 – Green Eggs and Ham, by Dr. Seuss, is published in the United States; 40 years on it will be the fourth-best selling English-language children's hardcover book yet written.
- September 5 – The Welsh poet Waldo Williams is imprisoned for six weeks for non-payment of income tax (a protest against defence spending).
- October 3 – The Lilly Library is opened on the campus of Indiana University Bloomington, based on the collections of Josiah K. Lilly Jr.
- October 6 and December 16 – Dalton Trumbo, one of the Hollywood Ten, receives full screenwriting credit for his work on the films Spartacus and Exodus, released in the United States on these dates. The actor Kirk Douglas publicly announces that Trumbo was the screenwriter of Spartacus, and President John F. Kennedy crosses American Legion picket lines to view the film, helping to end blacklisting.
- c. October – Vasily Grossman submits his novel Life and Fate (Жизнь и судьба) for publication, resulting in confiscation of the manuscript and all related material by the KGB in the Soviet Union.
- November – Rita Rait-Kovaleva's Russian translation of The Catcher in the Rye is published in the Soviet literary magazine Inostrannaya Literatura as Над пропастью во ржи ("Over the Abyss in Rye").
- November 2 – R v Penguin Books Ltd: Penguin Books is found not guilty of obscenity for publishing Lady Chatterley's Lover in the United Kingdom.
- November 8 – Richard Wright delivers a polemical lecture, "The Situation of the Black Artist and Intellectual in the United States", to students and members of the American Church in Paris, a few weeks before his death in the city from heart attack aged 52.
- November 10 – Lady Chatterley's Lover sells 200,000 copies in one day following its publication in the U.K. since being banned in 1928.
- November 17 – Michael Foot is re-elected to the Parliament of the United Kingdom and relinquishes the editorship of Tribune.
- November 19 – American novelist Norman Mailer stabs his wife, the artist Adele Morales.
- November 24 – Raymond Queneau founds Oulipo in France.
- unknown dates
  - Dutch mathematician Hans Freudenthal invents the artificial language Lincos, intended for communication with extraterrestrial intelligence.
  - Francophone African scholar Djibril Tamsir Niane publishes the novelization Soundjata, ou l'Epopée du Manding in Paris, the first extended transcription of the 13th-century Epic of Sundiata from Mandinka oral tradition and its first translation into a Western language.

== New books ==
=== Fiction ===
- Chinua Achebe – No Longer at Ease
- Kingsley Amis – Take a Girl Like You
- Poul Anderson – The High Crusade
- Lynne Reid Banks – The L-Shaped Room
- Stan Barstow – A Kind of Loving
- John Barth – The Sot-Weed Factor
- H. E. Bates – When the Green Woods Laugh
- Charles Beaumont – Night Ride and Other Journeys (short story collection)
- Robert Bloch – Pleasant Dreams: Nightmares (short story collection)
- Anita Rowe Block – Necessary End
- Algis Budrys – Rogue Moon
- Anthony Burgess
  - The Doctor is Sick
  - The Right to an Answer
- Morley Callaghan – The Many Colored Coat
- John Dickson Carr – In Spite of Thunder
- Carlo Cassola – Bébo's Girl (La ragazza di Bube)
- Henry Cecil – Alibi for a Judge
- Louis-Ferdinand Céline – North (Nord)
- Agatha Christie – The Adventure of the Christmas Pudding (short story collection)
- Roald Dahl – Kiss Kiss (short story collection)
- L. Sprague de Camp
  - The Bronze God of Rhodes
  - The Glory That Was
- L. Sprague de Camp and Fletcher Pratt – Wall of Serpents
- Carmen de Icaza – The House Across the Street (La casa de enfrente)
- Philip K. Dick
  - Dr. Futurity
  - Vulcan's Hammer
- E. L. Doctorow – Welcome to Hard Times
- Lawrence Durrell – Clea (final volume of The Alexandria Quartet, begun 1957)
- Henry Farrell – What Ever Happened to Baby Jane?
- Ian Fleming – For Your Eyes Only (James Bond short story collection)
- Sarah Gainham – The Silent Hostage
- Richard Gordon – Doctor in Clover
- Graham Greene – A Burnt-Out Case
- Arthur Hailey – In High Places
- Donald Hamilton – Death of a Citizen
- Wilson Harris – Palace of the Peacock
- James Leo Herlihy – All Fall Down
- Hammond Innes – The Doomed Oasis
- Michael Innes – The New Sonia Wayward
- Greye La Spina – Invaders from the Dark
- Jean Lartéguy – Les Centurions
- Harper Lee – To Kill a Mockingbird
- Clarice Lispector – Family Ties (Laços de família) (short story collection)
- David Lodge – The Picturegoers
- Ngaio Marsh – False Scent
- John Masters – The Venus of Konpara
- Richard Matheson – The Beardless Warriors
- Judith Merrill – The Tomorrow People
- Gladys Mitchell – Say It with Flowers
- Walter M. Miller – A Canticle for Leibowitz
- Nancy Mitford – Don't Tell Alfred
- Alberto Moravia – La noia (The Empty Canvas)
- Edna O'Brien – The Country Girls
- Flannery O'Connor – The Violent Bear It Away
- Scott O'Dell – Island of the Blue Dolphins
- Frederik Pohl – Drunkard's Walk
- Anthony Powell – Casanova's Chinese Restaurant
- James H. Schmitz – Agent of Vega
- Nevil Shute (died January 2) – Trustee from the Toolroom
- Clark Ashton Smith – The Abominations of Yondo
- Muriel Spark – The Ballad of Peckham Rye
- Alan Sillitoe – The General
- David Storey – This Sporting Life
- Rex Stout
  - Three at Wolfe's Door
  - Too Many Clients
- William Styron – Set This House on Fire
- Julian Symons – The Progress of a Crime
- John Updike – Rabbit, Run
- Irving Wallace – The Chapman Report
- John Edward Williams – Butcher's Crossing
- Raymond Williams – Border Country
- John Wyndham – Trouble with Lichen

=== Children and young people ===
- Jean Adamson – Monday Book (first in the Topsy and Tim series)
- Joan Aiken – The Kingdom and The Cave
- Rev. W. Awdry – The Twin Engines (fifteenth in The Railway Series)
- Hans Baumann – Ich zog mit Hannibal (I Marched with Hannibal, 1961)
- Sheila Burnford – The Incredible Journey
- P. D. Eastman – Are You My Mother?
- Alan Garner – The Weirdstone of Brisingamen
- Jean Craighead George – My Side of the Mountain
- Scott O'Dell – Island of the Blue Dolphins
- Georges Prosper Remi (as Hergé) – Tintin au Tibet (book publication)
- Dr. Seuss
  - Green Eggs and Ham
  - One Fish Two Fish Red Fish Blue Fish
- Barbara Sleigh – The Kingdom of Carbonel

=== Drama ===
- Edward Albee – The Death of Bessie Smith and The Sandbox (first performances)
- Samuel Beckett – The Old Tune (first broadcast)
- Robert Bolt – A Man for All Seasons (stage version) and The Tiger and the Horse
- Marc Camoletti – Boeing-Boeing
- Henry Cecil and William Saroyan – Settled Out of Court
- Agatha Christie – Go Back for Murder
- Noël Coward – Waiting in the Wings
- Beverley Cross – Strip the Willow
- Witold Gombrowicz – The Marriage (Ślub, first performance)
- Lillian Hellman – Toys in the Attic
- Eugène Ionesco – Rhinocéros
- Ira Levin – Critic's Choice
- Stephen Lewis and Theatre Workshop – Sparrers Can't Sing
- Bruce Mason – The End of the Golden Weather
- Tad Mosel – All the Way Home
- Harold Pinter
  - The Caretaker (first performed and published)
  - The Room (first professional performance)
  - A Night Out (first broadcast)
- Terence Rattigan – Ross
- Nelson Rodrigues – Beijo no Asfalto (The Asphalt Kiss)
- Wole Soyinka – A Dance of the Forests
- Gore Vidal – The Best Man
- Maruxa Vilalta – Los disorientados (The Disoriented Ones)
- Orson Welles (adaptation) – Chimes at Midnight
- Tennessee Williams – Period of Adjustment

=== Poetry ===
- Douglas Livingstone – The Skull in the Mud
- Sylvia Plath – The Colossus and Other Poems
- Alan Sillitoe – The Rats and other poems

=== Non-fiction ===
- Joy Adamson – Born Free
- Kingsley Amis – New Maps of Hell
- Philippe Ariès – Centuries of Childhood: A Social History of Family Life (L'Enfant et la vie familiale sous l'Ancien Régime)
- Peg Bracken – The I Hate to Cook Book
- Albert Camus (died January 4) – Resistance, Rebellion, and Death (selected essays)
- Jean-Paul Desbiens – Les Insolences du Frère Untel (The Insolences of Brother Anonymous)
- Hans-Georg Gadamer – Truth and Method (Wahrheit und Methode)
- John Howard Griffin – Black Like Me
- Helen Keller – Light in my Darkness
- Arthur Koestler – The Lotus and the Robot
- Jessica Mitford – Hons and Rebels
- A. S. Neill – Summerhill: A Radical Approach to Child Rearing
- Louis Pauwels and Jacques Bergier – The Morning of the Magicians (Le Matin des magiciens)
- R. C. Majumdar – An Advanced History of India
- Jean-Paul Sartre – Critique of Dialectical Reason (Critique de la raison dialectique)
- William L. Shirer – The Rise and Fall of the Third Reich
- H. H. Smythe and M. M. Smythe – The New Nigerian Elite
- W. T. Stace – The Teachings of the Mystics
- Elie Wiesel – Night (La Nuit, 1958)

== Births ==
- January 18 – Mark Rylance, English actor and theatre director
- January 23 – André Verbart, Dutch poet
- January 28 – Robert von Dassanowsky, Austrian-American historian and academic
- January 31 – Grant Morrison, Scottish comic-book and graphic-novel scriptwriter
- February 19 – Helen Fielding, English novelist and screenwriter
- March 8 – Jeffrey Eugenides, American fiction writer
- April 28 – Ian Rankin, Scottish crime novelist
- April 29 – Andrew Miller, English novelist
- May 4 – Kate Saunders, English author and children's writer
- May 21 – John O'Brien, American novelist (died 1994)
- May 24 – Eric Brown, British science fiction writer (died 2023)
- June 2 – Julie Myerson, English novelist and columnist
- July 13 – Ian Hislop, Welsh-born satirist
- August 4 – Tim Winton, Australian novelist
- October 2 – Joe Sacco, Maltese-born graphic author
- October 18 – Hồ Anh Thái, Vietnamese author
- November 10 – Neil Gaiman, English author
- December 10 – Kenneth Branagh, Northern Irish actor and screenwriter
- December 14 – Wolf Haas, Austrian writer
- unknown dates
  - Malcolm Pryce, Anglo-Welsh detective novelist
  - Alexis Stamatis, Greek novelist, playwright and poet
  - D. J. Taylor, English literary critic and biographer

== Deaths ==
- January 4 – Albert Camus, French Pied-Noir novelist (car accident, born 1913)
- January 9 – Elsie J. Oxenham (Elsie Jeanette Dunkerley), English girls' story writer (born 1880)
- January 12 – Nevil Shute, English-born novelist (stroke, born 1899)
- January 14 – Ralph Chubb, English poet, printer and artist (born 1892)
- January 28 – Zora Neale Hurston, African-American anthropologist and author (born 1891)
- March 5 – Dornford Yates (Cecil William Mercer), English novelist and writer (born 1885)
- April 5 – Peter Llewelyn Davies, English publisher, inspiration for Peter Pan (suicide, born 1897)
- May 30 – Boris Pasternak, Russian novelist, poet and translator (born 1890)
- July 27
  - Leonora Eyles, English feminist writer and novelist (born 1889)
  - Ethel Lilian Voynich, Anglo-Irish novelist and composer (born 1864)
- July 28 – Kassian Bogatyrets, Rusyn priest, politician and historian (born 1868)
- August 19 – Frances Cornford, English poet (born 1886)
- August 29 – Vicki Baum, Austrian-born novelist writing in German and English (born 1888)
- October 19 – Hjalmar Dahl, Finnish journalist, translator and writer (born 1891)
- October 31 – H. L. Davis, American fiction writer and poet (born 1894)
- November 20 – Ya'akov Cohen, Russian-born Israeli poet (born 1881)
- November 28 – Richard Wright, African-American novelist and poet (born 1908)
- December 26 – Tetsuro Watsuji (和辻 哲郎), Japanese philosopher and historian of ideas (born 1889)

== Awards ==
- American Academy of Arts and Letters Gold Medal for Criticism: E. B. White
- Carnegie Medal for children's literature: Ian Wolfran Cornwall, The Making of Man
- Eric Gregory Award: Christopher Levenson
- Friedenspreis des Deutschen Buchhandels: Victor Gollancz
- James Tait Black Memorial Prize for fiction: Rex Warner, Imperial Caesar
- James Tait Black Memorial Prize for biography: Canon Adam Fox, The Life of Dean Inge
- Kate Greenaway Medal: Gerald Rose, Old Winkle and the seagulls
- Miles Franklin Award: Elizabeth O'Conner, The Irishman
- Newbery Medal for children's literature: Joseph Krumgold, Onion John
- Nobel Prize in Literature: Saint-John Perse
- Pulitzer Prize for Drama: Jerome Weidman, George Abbott for book, Jerry Bock for music, and Sheldon Harnick for lyrics, Fiorello!
- Pulitzer Prize for Fiction: Allen Drury, Advise and Consent
- Pulitzer Prize for Poetry: W. D. Snodgrass, Heart's Needle
- Queen's Gold Medal for Poetry: John Betjeman
