= The Stone Roses (disambiguation) =

The Stone Roses are an English rock band.

The Stone Roses may also refer to:

- The Stone Roses (album), the debut album of the band
- The Stone Roses: Made of Stone, a documentary about the band
- The Stone Roses (novel), a 1959 novel by Sarah Gainham

== See also ==
- The Stone Rose, a Doctor Who novel
