= Conference of Carnuntum =

308 meeting of Roman emperors

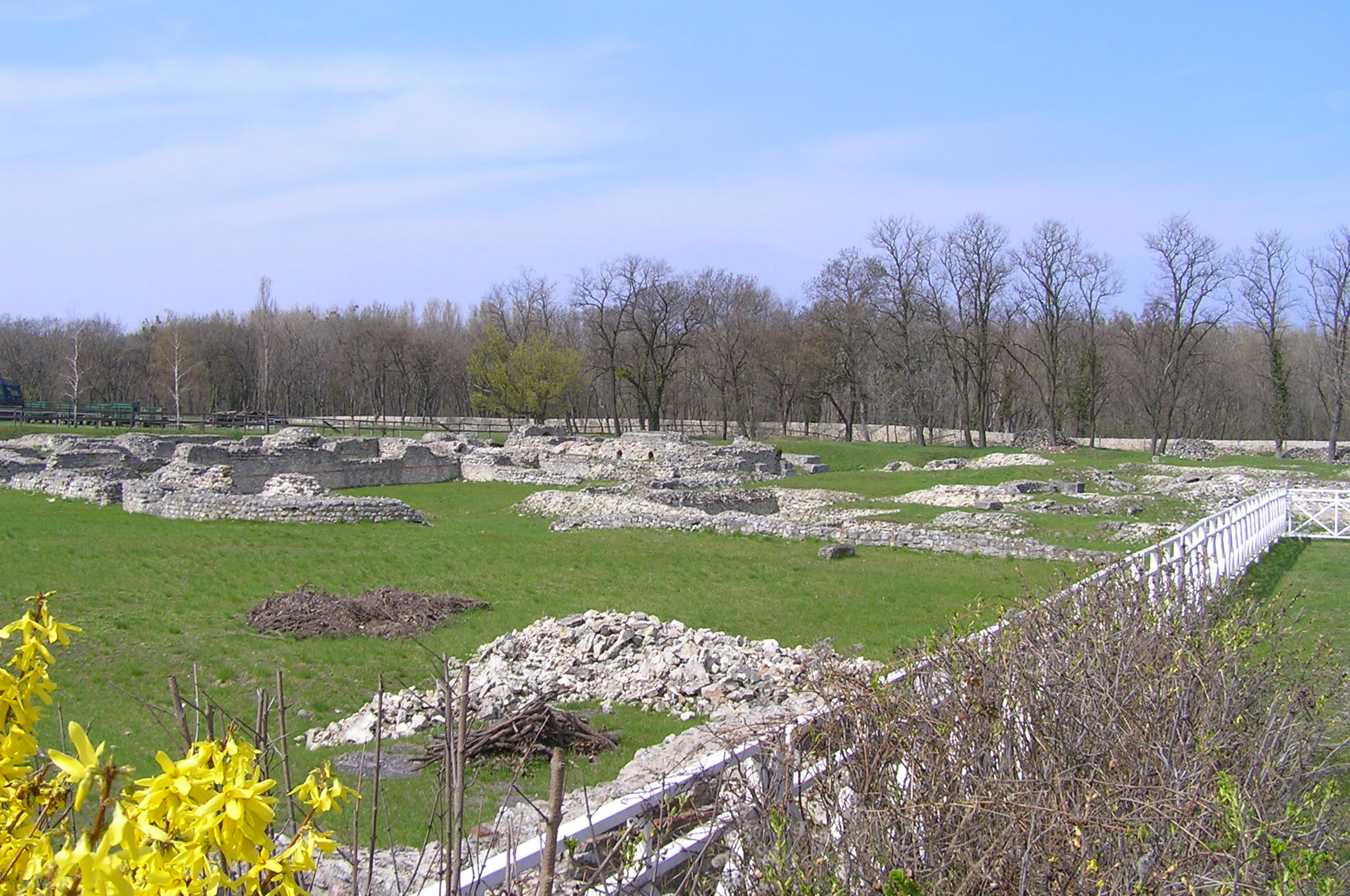
- Ruins of Carnuntum
- Participants: Diocletian, Galerius, Maximian, Licinius
- Location: Carnuntum, Austria, (ancient Panonnia Prima)
- Date: November 11, 308
- Result: Inconclusive

The Conference of Carnuntum was a gathering of ancient Roman rulers on 11 November 308, intended to stabilize the power-sharing arrangement known as the Tetrarchy. It was convened by the Eastern augustus (emperor) Galerius (r. 305–311) in the city of Carnuntum (present-day Petronell-Carnuntum, Austria), which at the time was located in the Roman province of Pannonia Prima. A dispute over the title of augustus in the West had been ongoing since the previous year, when consecutive invasions by Severus II (r. 306–307) and Galerius had failed to recover Italy from the usurper Maxentius (r. 306–312) and Maximian (r. 286–305, 306–308). Present at the conference were the retired Diocletian (r. 284–305), and his former colleague, Maximian.

According to deliberations at the meeting, Maximian was to retire permanently from his imperial position, and Maxentius was still to be treated as a usurper; Licinius (r. 308–324), a former general of Galerius, was raised as the western Augustus and made responsible for overthrowing Maxentius; and Constantine (r. 306–337) was relegated, for the second time, to western caesar. These decisions, however, did not please most of them: Constantine questioned his demotion and persisted in using the style of augustus, while Maximinus (r. 305–313) demanded promotion from Galerius. Maximian, also unsatisfied with his demotion, later attempted one last conspiracy in 310, at the court of Constantine in Arles. Licinius did nothing in the following years to stop Maxentius.

== Background ==
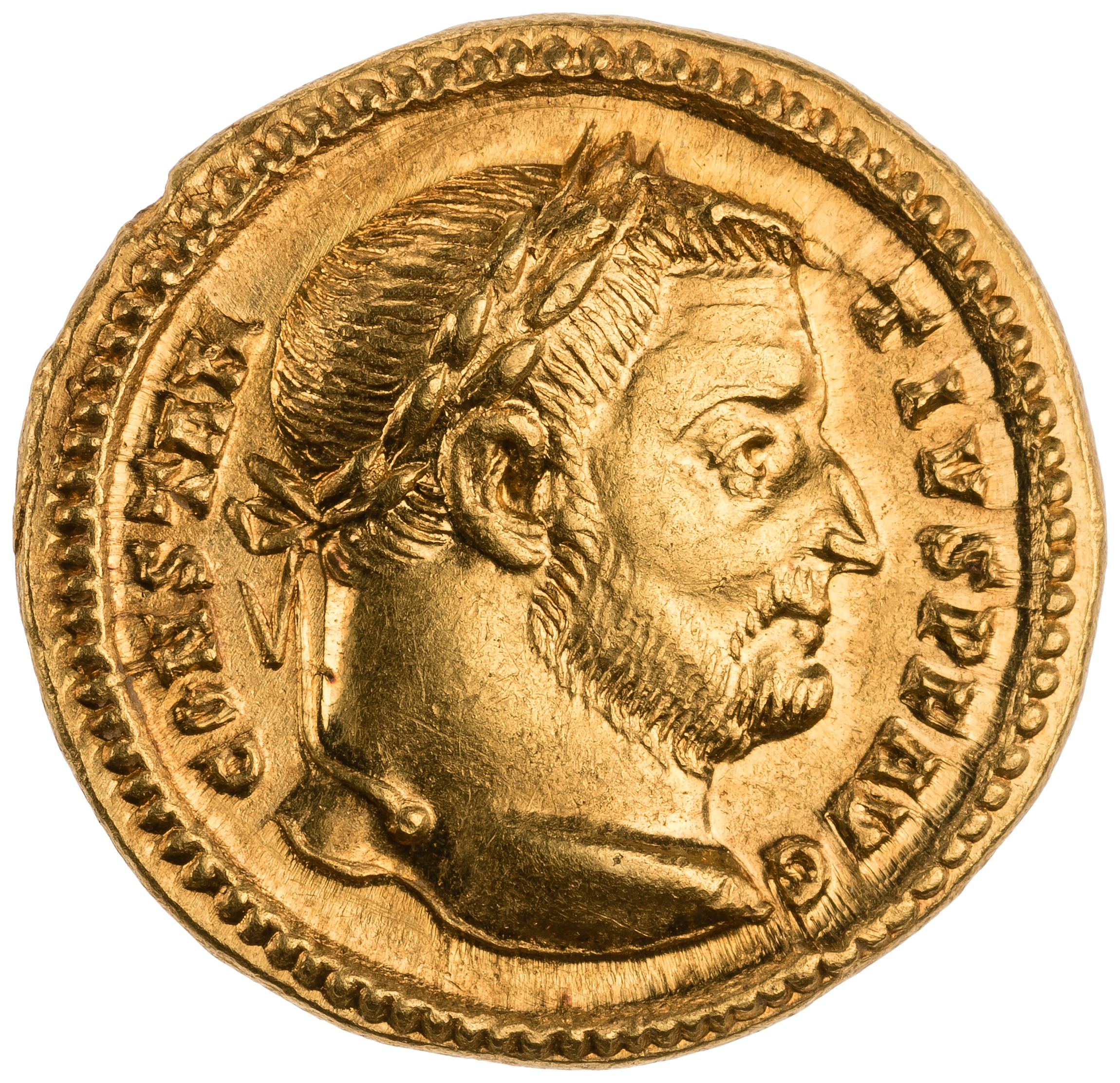
Aureus of Constantius I

Since March 293, the Roman Empire had been governed by four tetrarchs, a set of two augusti (emperors) and two caesares (heirs) for each of the western and eastern portions. On 1 May 305, the augusti Diocletian (r. 284–305) and Maximian (r. 285–305) voluntarily abdicated and their caesares Constantius (r. 293–306) and Galerius (r. 293–311) were elevated to the western and eastern augustal position respectively, while Severus II (r. 305–307) and Maximinus Daza (r. 305–313) would become the western and eastern caesares, respectively.

Constantius died at Eboracum (present-day York, England) on 25 July 306, and his soldiers acclaimed his son Constantine (r. 306–337) as his successor. However, as per the arrangement of the prevailing Tetrarchy, Galerius elevated Severus II (r. 305–307) as the new augustus of the West in opposition to Constantine. After some diplomatic discussions, Galerius relegated Constantine to the position of caesar, which he accepted, thus allowing Severus to assume his position.

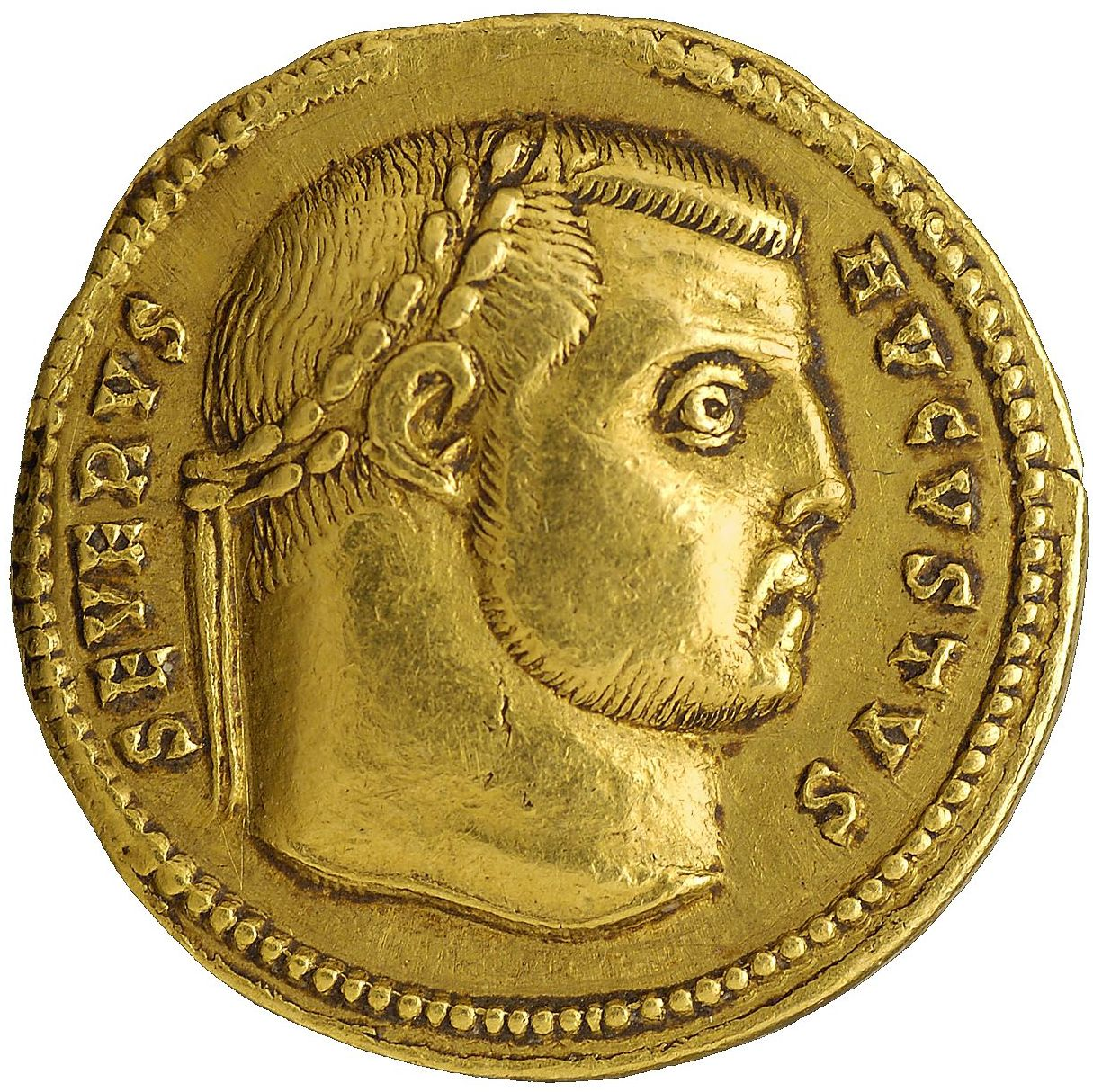
Aureus of Severus II

Maxentius (r. 306–312), son of Maximian, was jealous of Constantine's elevation, and during a riot over capitation tax in Rome, a cohort of praetorian guards acclaimed him emperor on 28 October 306, though at first he styled himself princeps invictus ("undefeated prince"), in the hope of obtaining recognition of his reign by the senior emperor Galerius. Then, uncomfortable with sole leadership, Maxentius sent a set of imperial robes to Maximian and saluted him as "augustus for the second time", offering him theoretical equal rule but less actual power and a lower rank. By 307, both had suffered invasions. The first by Severus II, who surrendered to Maximian, after which Maxentius publicly assumed the style of augustus, and then by Galerius himself, who ultimately decided to withdraw. Before or during Galerius' invasion, Severus was executed or was forced to commit suicide.

Soon afterwards, Maximian made his way to Gaul to negotiate with Constantine. A deal was struck in which Constantine would marry Maximian's younger daughter Fausta and be elevated to augustan rank in Maxentius' secessionist regime. In return, Constantine would reaffirm the old family alliance between Maximian and Constantius, and support Maxentius' cause in Italy but would remain neutral in the war with Galerius. The deal was sealed with a double ceremony in Augusta Treverorum (present day Trier, Germany) in late 307, at which Constantine married Fausta and was declared augustus by Maximian. In 308, likely in April, Maximian fled Italy in disgrace after an unsuccessful attempt to depose his son, eventually making his way to Constantine's court in Gaul. Aware of the situation in the west, Galerius decided to organize a conference, and Maximian pinned his hopes for re-ascension on it.

== Conference ==
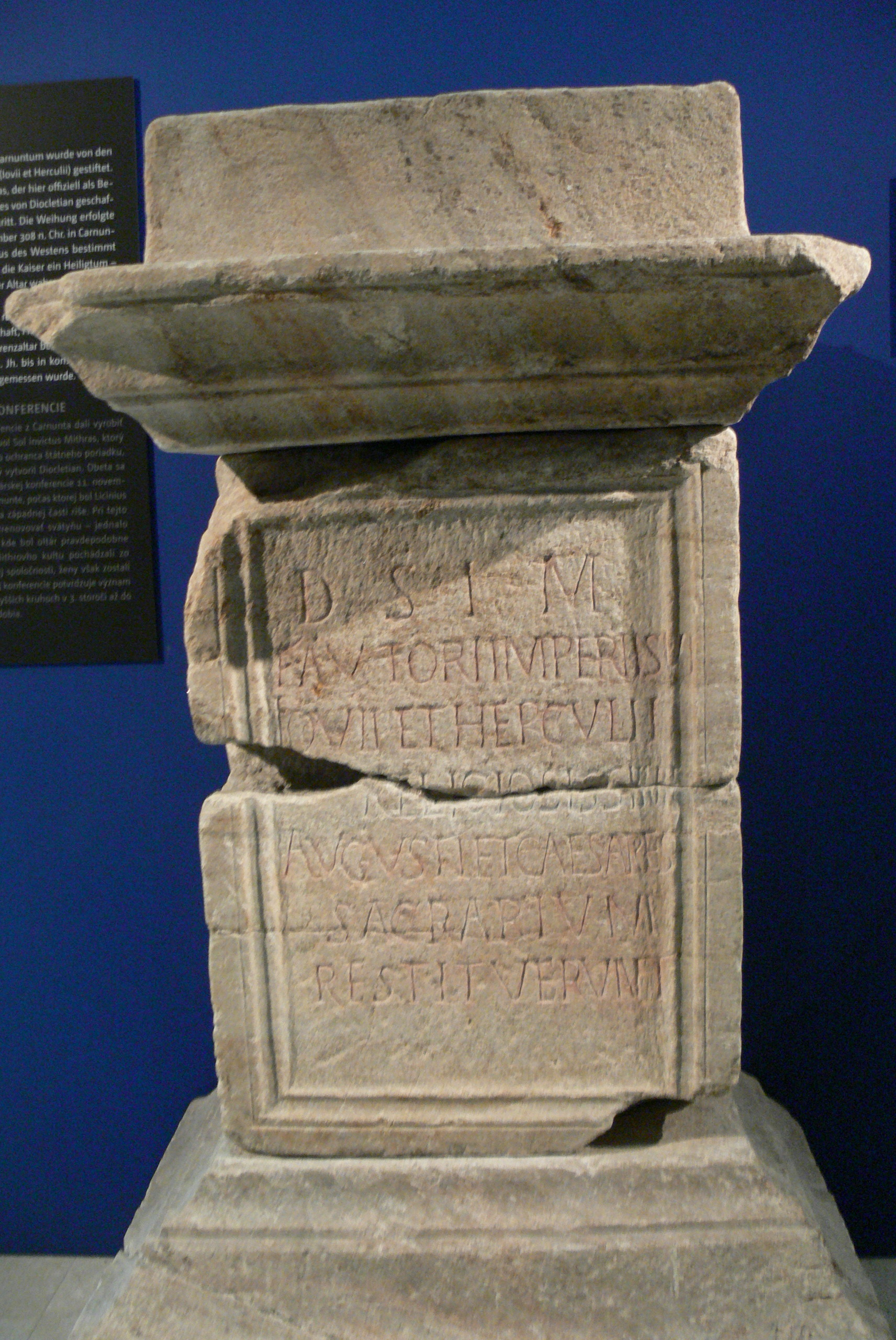
Altar dedicated to Mithras built by Galerius, Diocletian and Maximian at the conference on behalf of all the emperors. Carnuntum Museum

On 11 November 308, Galerius convened the Conference of Carnuntum (now Petronell-Carnuntum, Austria) to try to stabilize the situation in the western provinces. Present at the conference were the retired emperor Diocletian, who briefly returned to public life, Galerius, and Maximian. At the conference, Maximian was forced to abdicate again, and Constantine was re-relegated to his former position as caesar.

In addition, Licinius, one of Galerius' military companions who was attending the conference, was acclaimed as the new augustus in the West, and was given the regions of Thrace, Pannonia, and Illyria, as well as the mission of neutralizing Maxentius in Italy. Finally, the augusti present rebuilt the Mithraeum of Carnuntum and dedicated it to the absent caesares (Constantine and Maximinus Daza) and themselves:

D(eo) S(oli) i(nvicto) M(ithrae) Fautori imperii sui Iovii et Herculii religiosissimi Augusti et Caesares Sacrarium restituerunt

For the scholar A. L. Frothingham, considering that by the fourth century the cult of Mithras and the Sol Invictus was on the rise, it is not surprising that a dedication was made to these gods in the name of the emperors. According to him, this could be interpreted as a symbolic handing over of the state to these gods, who from that moment on would have the mission to guard it and prevent it from returning to the Crisis of the Third Century.

Augusti

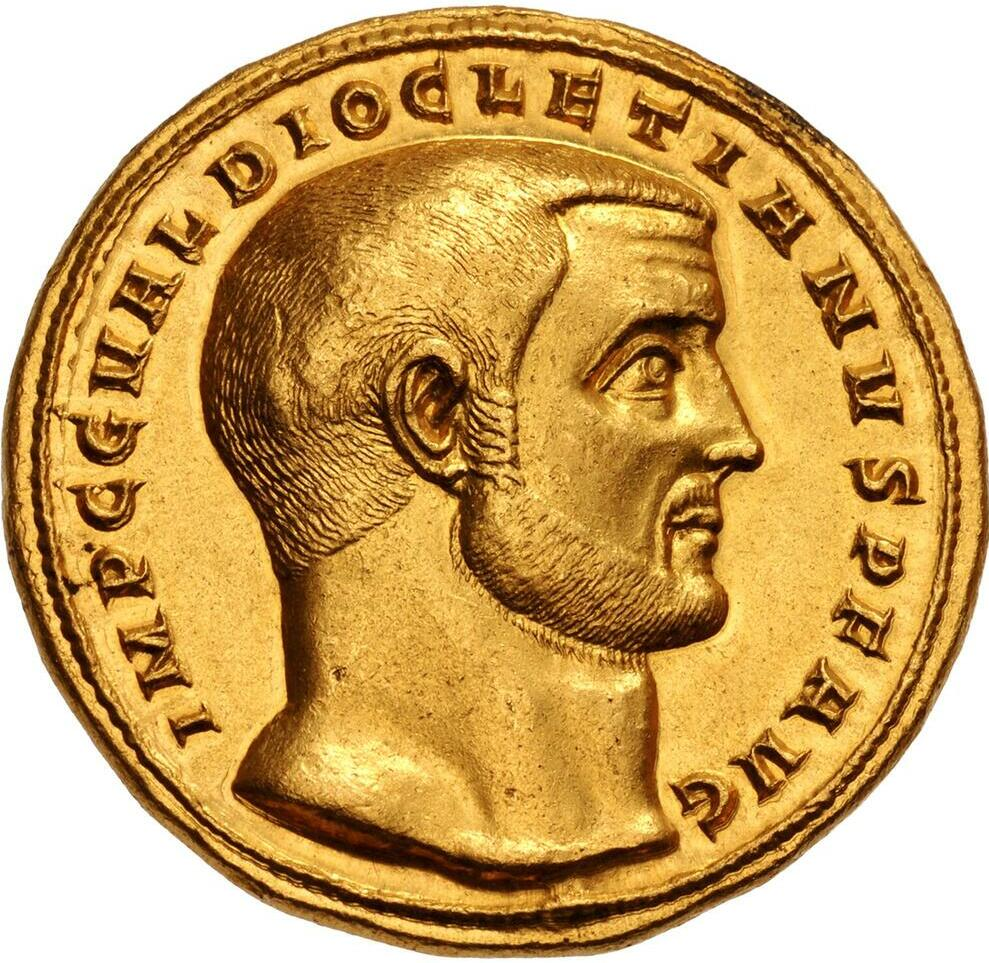
Medallion of Diocletian, 303

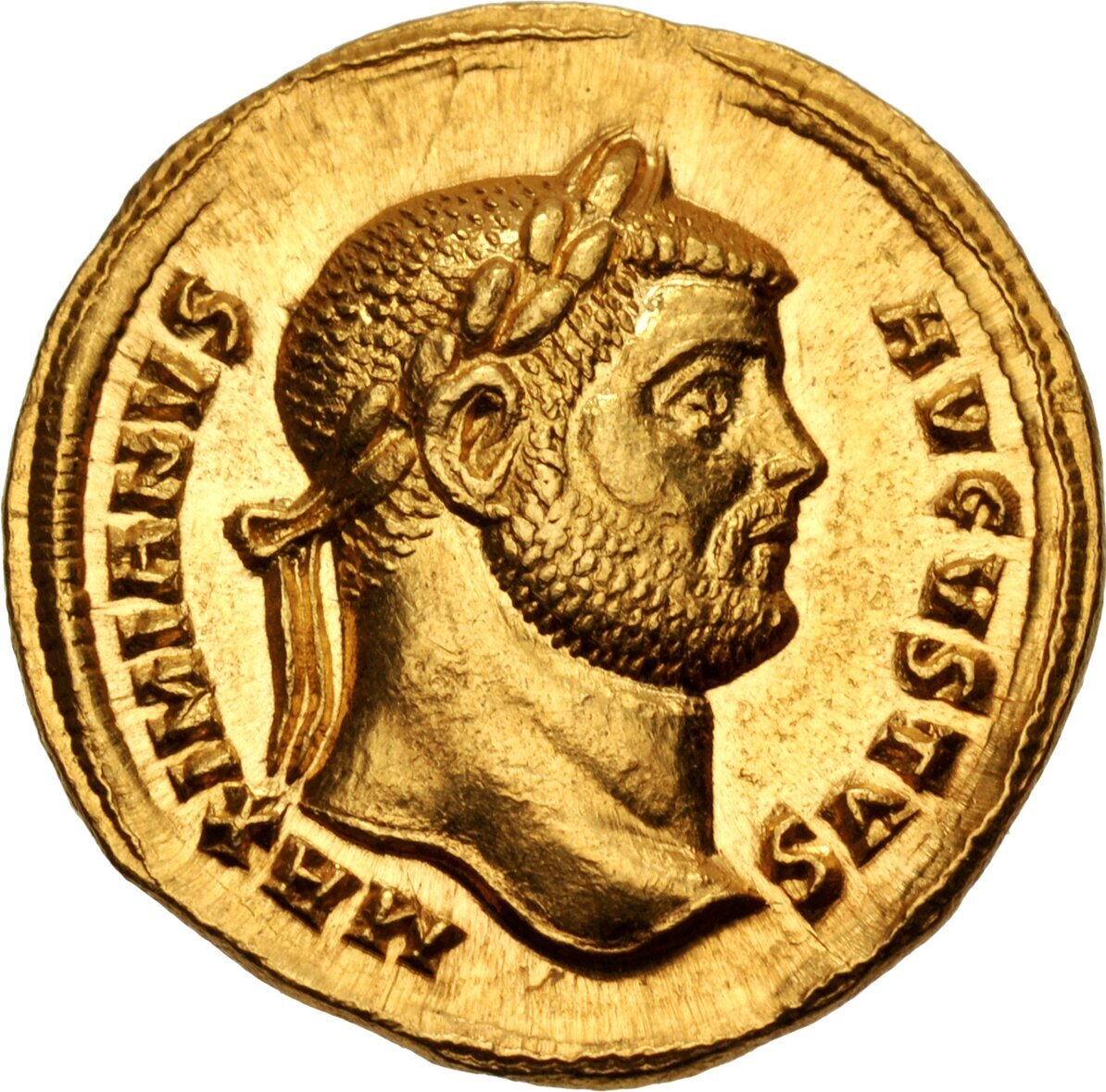
Aureus of Maximian, c. 294

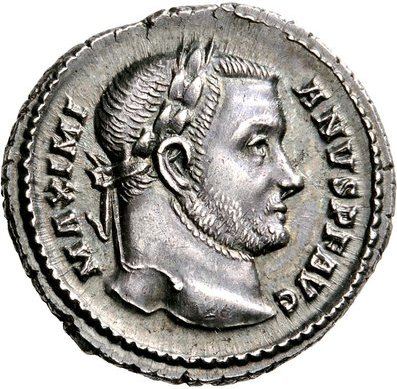
Argenteus of Galerius, c. 306

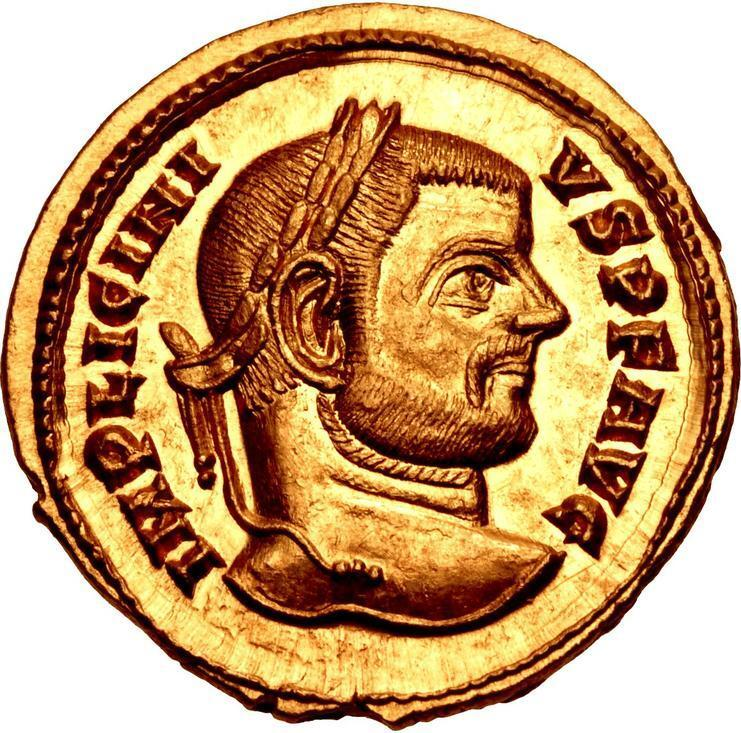
Solidus of Licinius, c. 312
Caesares

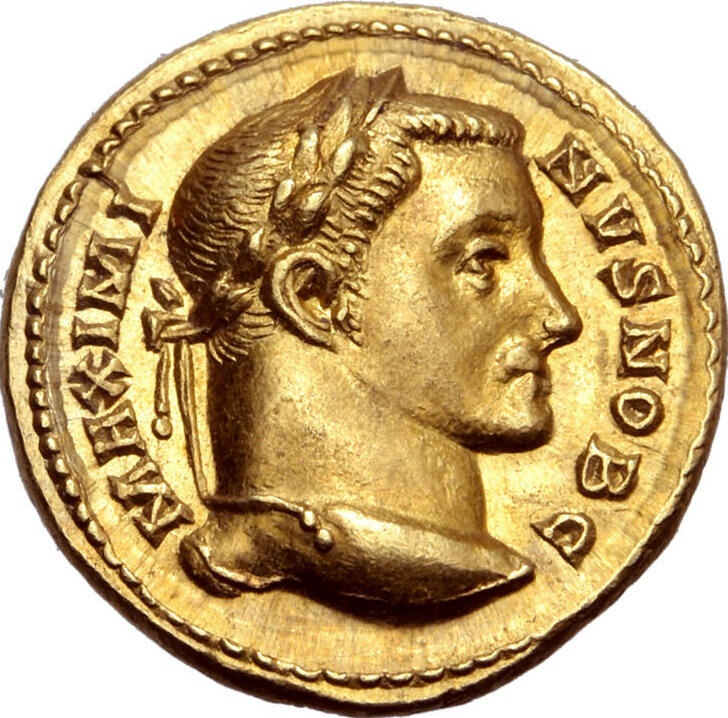
Aureus of Maximinus II, 313

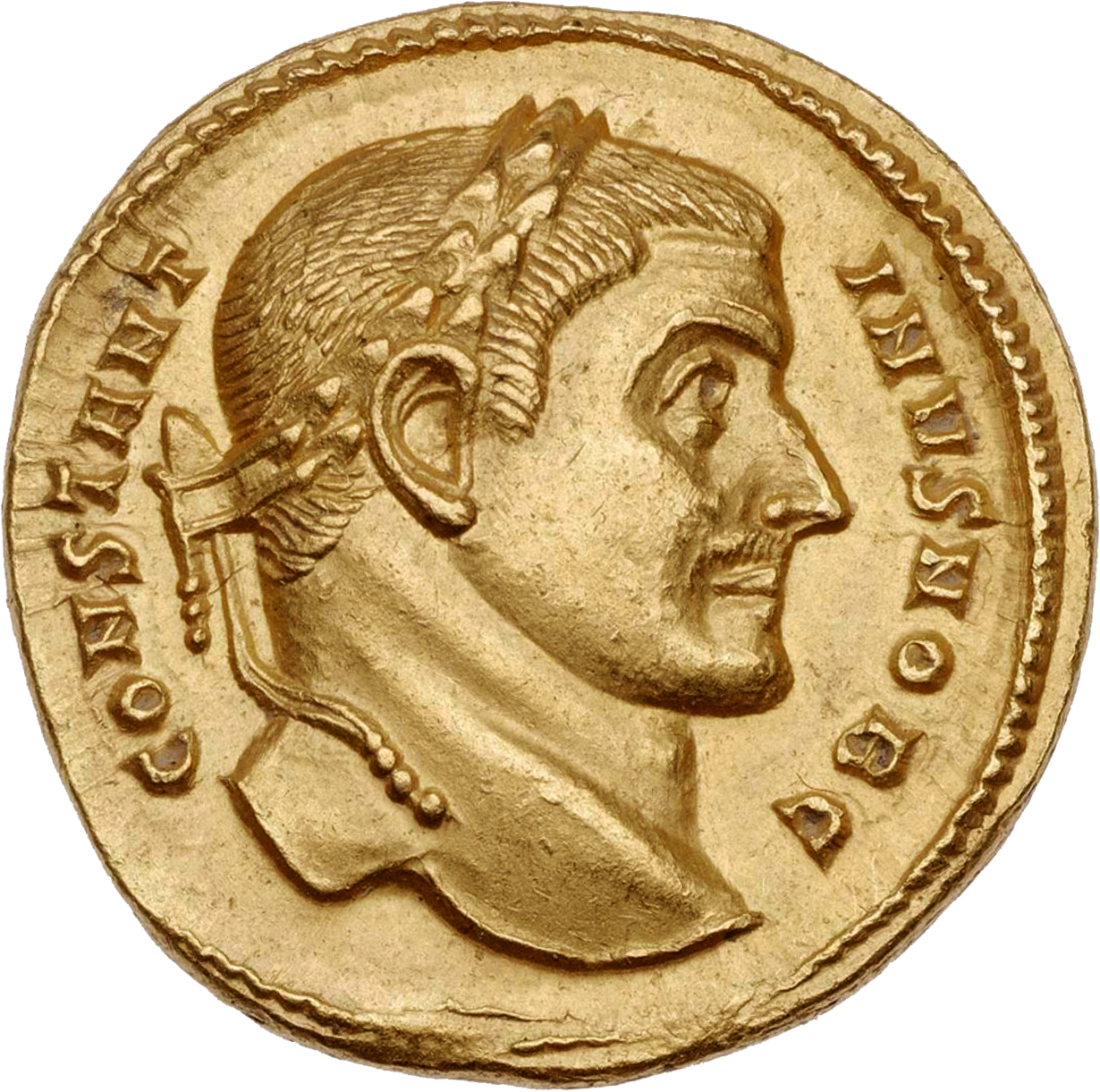
Solidus of Constantine I, 307

== Consequences ==
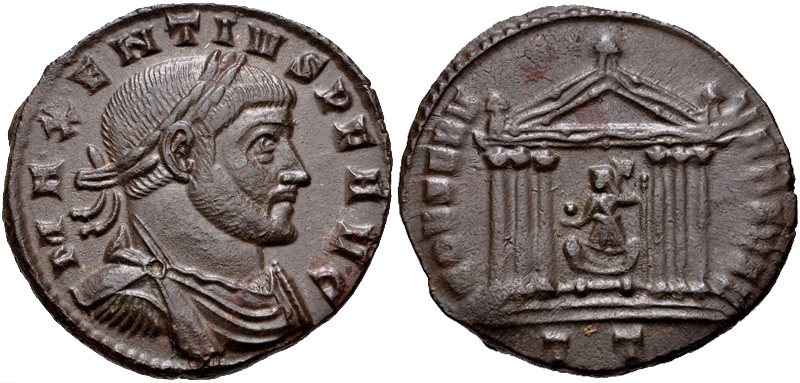
Follis of Maxentius (r. 306–312) issued in Ticino c. 307–308

The new system would not last long: Constantine refused to accept his relegation and continued to portray himself as augustus on his coinage, even though the other members of the Tetrarchy referred to him as caesar. Maximinus Daza, frustrated at being disregarded in favor of Licinius, demanded that Galerius promote him as well. Galerius offered to call both Maximinus and Constantine filii augustorum ("sons of the augustus", sing. filius augustī), a title they both refused. Between late 309 and the spring of 310, Galerius relented and made each an augustus, bringing the number of full augusti to five; Maxentius had retained the title undisturbed, as Licinius contented himself with addressing internal problems and barbarian incursions in his own provinces.

In early 310 Maximian revolted at Arelate (present-day Arles, France) and tried to supplant Constantine, who was occupied fighting Frankish invaders on the Rhine frontier. As soon as Constantine learned what had happened, he headed south and easily quelled the revolt, which had gained little support; Maximian was captured and induced to die by suicide. The following year, Maxentius, calling for revenge for his father's death, declared war on Constantine, who responded with an invasion of northern Italy in 312. Galerius died in the same year and the Eastern Roman Empire was divided between Maximinus and Licinius. The two signed a peace agreement, but abandoned it in 313 and commenced civil war.

== See also ==
- Carnuntum
- Petronell-Carnuntum
- Roman Empire
