= Private Worlds (Gainham novel) =

1971 novel by Sarah Gainham

- First edition (UK)
- Author: Sarah Gainham
- Language: English
- Genre: Drama
- Publisher: Weidenfeld & Nicolson (UK); Holt Rinehart (US)
- Publication date: 1971
- Publication place: United Kingdom
- Media type: Print
- Preceded by: A Place in the Country

Private Worlds is a 1971 novel by the British writer Sarah Gainham. It was the third in her Vienna trilogy following the popular first novel Night Falls on the City.

== Synopsis ==
Now that the immediate post-war crisis of Vienna has finished, Julia Homburg and her old friend and lover, the journalist Georg Kerenyi, are able to reconstruct their former lives at the same time as a new, independent and democratic Austrian Republic is being formed.

== Bibliography ==
- Burton, Alan. Historical Dictionary of British Spy Fiction. Rowman & Littlefield, 2016.
- Husband, Janet G. & Husband Jonathan F. Sequels: An Annotated Guide to Novels in Series. American Library Association, 2009.
- Reilly, John M. Twentieth Century Crime & Mystery Writers. Springer, 2015.
