= The Mythmaker =

1957 novel

- First edition (UK)
- Author: Sarah Gainham
- Language: English
- Genre: Thriller
- Publisher: Arthur Barker (UK); E.P. Dutton (US)
- Publication date: 1957
- Publication place: United Kingdom
- Media type: Print

The Mythmaker is a 1957 spy thriller novel by the British writer Sarah Gainham, her third published novel. As with many of her works it takes place in Vienna, where she settled in the post-war era. It was released in the United States in 1958 under the alternative title Appointment in Vienna.

== Synopsis ==
Kit Quest, a half-Hungarian British Army officer travels to Vienna on the pretext of visiting his family but in fact he is charged with hunting down a war criminal Otto Berger.

== Bibliography ==
- Burton, Alan. Historical Dictionary of British Spy Fiction. Rowman & Littlefield, 2016.
- Reilly, John M. Twentieth Century Crime & Mystery Writers. Springer, 2015.
- Smith, Myron J. & White, Terry. Cloak and Dagger Fiction: An Annotated Guide to Spy Thrillers. Greenwood Press, 1995.
