= Sarah Gainham =

British novelist (1915–1999)

- Born: Rachel Stainer; 1 October 1915; London, England, UK
- Died: 24 November 1999 (aged 84); Petronell, Austria
- Occupations: Writer, journalist, novelist
- Spouse(s): Antony Terry, Kenneth Ames
- Writing career
- Pen name: Sarah Gainham
- Years active: 1956-1999

Rachel Ames, née Stainer (London, 1 October 1915 – Petronell, Austria, 24 November 1999) was a British novelist and journalist who wrote under the pseudonym Sarah Gainham. She is perhaps best known for her 1967 novel Night Falls on the City, the first of a trilogy about life in Vienna under Nazi rule.

== Life ==
Rachel Stainer was born in Islington, London as Amy Rachel Stainer. After her father Tom died in the First World War, the family moved to Newbury, Berkshire.

She first married John P. Nixon at St. Marylebone Church in London in 1939, which may be the "impulsive and unsuccessful wartime liaison" mentioned in an obituary. After her second marriage to the journalist and intelligence agent Antony Imbert-Terry in 1947 she moved with him to Vienna, Austria, where she worked with the Four Power Commission. Imbert-Terry was the German correspondent for The Sunday Times, hired by the paper's Foreign Manager Ian Fleming, and the marriage soon "fell victim to his workload".

Stainer never returned to England, living in Berlin, Bonn and Trieste before returning to Vienna. In 1956, Cyril Ray helped secure her a job as Central and Eastern Europe Correspondent for The Spectator, making a plea that she needed the money. Writing as Sarah Gainham (the name of her maternal great-grandmother), she reported on Germany and the German-speaking parts of Central Europe until 1966. She soon published her first novel, Time Right Deadly (1956), a semi-autobiographical account of an unsuccessful affair. The novel was followed by several other spy thrillers set in Europe. Here Gainham drew on her own knowledge of Cold War spies and intrigues: Terry, hired to The Sunday Times by Ian Fleming, may have been an MI6 agent, and Gainham herself apparently researched a document 'East-West Routes for Agents', commissioned by Fleming, on how to gain access to West Berlin from East Berlin.

In 1964, her marriage to Terry was dissolved, and she married Kenneth Ames, Central European correspondent of The Economist.

Gainham's 1967 book Night Falls on the City, a tale of love and betrayal set in wartime Vienna, achieved significant commercial success: it topped the New York Times bestseller list for several months, and was widely translated. It was the first novel of a trilogy, completed by A Place in the Country (1969) and Private Worlds (1971), and gave her financial security.

In 1975, Ames committed suicide, leaving Gainham alone in later life. In 1976, she moved from Vienna to a small house in Petronell-Carnuntum, on the banks of the Danube, and became a somewhat eccentric recluse. Her last novel was the heavily autobiographical but unsuccessful The Tiger, Life (1983). In 1984, she was made a Fellow of the Royal Society of Literature. A Discursive Essay on the Presentation of Recent History in England was privately published in 1999.

== Works ==
- Time Right Deadly. London: Arthur Barker, 1956.
- The Cold Dark Night. London: Arthur Barker, 1957.
- The Mythmaker. London: Arthur Barker, 1957.
- The Stone Roses. London: Eyre & Spottiswoode, 1958.
- (tr.) The Voice of Fear: ten poems by E. G. Molnár. Translated from the German of Illa Kovarik and Tibor Simányi, with drawings by Hugo Matzenauer. Vienna: Ars Hungarica, 1959.
- The Silent Hostage. London: Eyre & Spottiswoode, 1960.
- Night Falls on the City. London: Collins, 1967.
- A Place in the Country. London: Weidenfeld & Nicolson, 1969.
- Takeover Bid: a tale. London: Weidenfeld and Nicolson, 1970.
- Private Worlds. London: Weidenfeld & Nicolson, 1971.
- Maculan's Daughter. London: Macmillan, 1973.
- To the Opera Ball. London: Macmillan, 1975.
- The Habsburg Twilight: tales from Vienna. London: Weidenfeld and Nicolson, 1979.
- The Tiger, Life. London: Methuen, 1983.
- A Discursive Essay on the Presentation of Recent History in England. New Millennium, 1999.
