= The Cold Dark Night =

1957 novel

- First edition (UK)
- Author: Sarah Gainham
- Language: English
- Genre: Thriller
- Publisher: Arthur Barker
- Publication date: 1957
- Publication place: United Kingdom
- Media type: Print

The Cold Dark Night is a 1957 spy thriller novel by the British writer Sarah Gainham. Her second novel, it is set at the height of the Cold War when the 1954 Berlin Conference saw the Big Four foreign ministers arrive in the divided city. Gainham had worked in Berlin as a journalist at the time of the Conference.

== Synopsis ==
Joe Purdey, an American journalist in Berlin to cover the conference encounters Gisela Schill, a refugee from East Germany whose husband has gone missing while working for British intelligence behind the Iron Curtain. He is drawn into the world of subterfuge and low-level spying taking place in the city. The novel concludes with a face-off between British and Soviet forces at the Anhalter Bahnhof, a ruined railway terminus on the border between the two zones.

== Bibliography ==
- Burton, Alan. Historical Dictionary of British Spy Fiction. Rowman & Littlefield, 2016.
- Reilly, John M. Twentieth Century Crime & Mystery Writers. Springer, 2015.
