= Time Right Deadly =

1956 novel

- First edition (UK)
- Author: Sarah Gainham
- Language: English
- Genre: Thriller
- Publisher: Arthur Barker
- Publication date: 1956
- Publication place: United Kingdom
- Media type: Print

Time Right Deadly is a 1956 thriller novel by the British writer Sarah Gainham. Her debut novel, it was shortlisted for the Gold Dagger Award, losing out to Edward Grierson's The Second Man. Like many of her novels it takes place in post-war Austria, where she lived.

== Bibliography ==
- Burton, Alan. Historical Dictionary of British Spy Fiction. Rowman & Littlefield, 2016.
- Hicken, Mandy & Prytherch, Raymond John. Now Read on: A Guide to Contemporary Popular Fiction. Scolar Press, 1994.
- Reilly, John M. Twentieth Century Crime & Mystery Writers. Springer, 2015.
