= The Silent Hostage =

1960 novel

- First edition (UK)
- Author: Sarah Gainham
- Language: English
- Genre: Thriller
- Publisher: Eyre & Spottiswoode (UK); E.P. Dutton (US)
- Publication date: 1960
- Publication place: United Kingdom
- Media type: Print

The Silent Hostage is a 1960 spy thriller novel by the British writer Sarah Gainham. Before writing her most celebrated work Night Falls on the City, Gainham produced several thrillers set in Continental Europe where she had lived since 1947. The novel takes place on the Adriatic Coast of Yugoslavia not long after the Second World War.

== Synopsis ==
Kate Dodds, the widow of a British war hero, is invited by the Titoist Yugoslav government to visit the country where her husband served alongside the partisans. Before long she is caught up in intrigue amidst early Cold War politics.

== Bibliography ==
- Burton, Alan. Historical Dictionary of British Spy Fiction. Rowman & Littlefield, 2016.
- Reilly, John M. Twentieth Century Crime & Mystery Writers. Springer, 2015.
- Smith, Myron J. & White, Terry. Cloak and Dagger Fiction: An Annotated Guide to Spy Thrillers. Greenwood Press, 1995.
