= A Place in the Country (novel) =

1969 novel

- First edition (UK)
- Author: Sarah Gainham
- Language: English
- Genre: Drama
- Publisher: Weidenfeld & Nicolson (UK); Holt Rinehart (US)
- Publication date: 1969
- Publication place: United Kingdom
- Media type: Print
- Preceded by: Night Falls on the City
- Followed by: Private Worlds

A Place in the Country is a 1969 novel by the British writer Sarah Gainham. It was the second in her Vienna trilogy following on from the popular first novel Night Falls on the City.

== Synopsis ==
The novel follows Julia Homburg, once a celebrated actress and now sheltering in the countryside having survived the devastation of the Second World War. She encounters a British Army officer Robert Inglis serving in Vienna with the Allied Occupation Forces. Meanwhile, her old friend the journalist Georg Kerenyi returns half-starved from the East.

== Bibliography ==
- Burton, Alan. Historical Dictionary of British Spy Fiction. Rowman & Littlefield, 2016.
- Husband, Janet G. & Husband, Jonathan F. Sequels: An Annotated Guide to Novels in Series. American Library Association, 2009.
- Reilly, John M. Twentieth Century Crime & Mystery Writers. Springer, 2015.
