= Carnuntum =

Ancient Roman military outpost in modern Austria

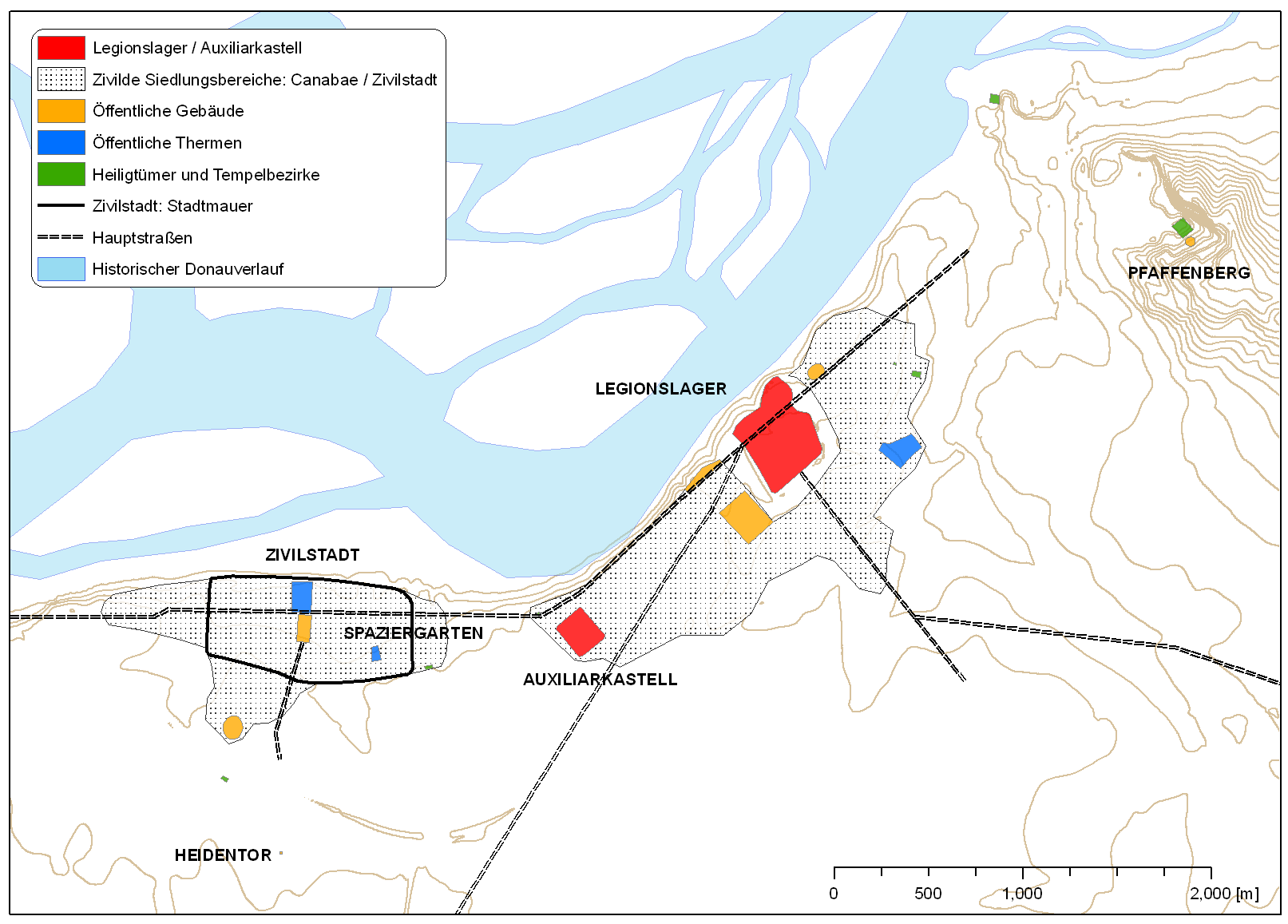
- The legionary fortress, auxiliary fort and town (canabae)
- Interactive map of Carnuntum
- 48°06′48″N 16°51′41″E
- Type: Castrum
- Periods: Roman Empire
- Location: Lower Austria, Austria
- Region: Pannonia Superior

UNESCO World Heritage Site
- Part of: Frontiers of the Roman Empire – The Danube Limes (Western Segment)
- Criteria: Cultural: ii, iii, iv
- Reference: 1608bis-071
- Inscription: 2021 (44th Session)

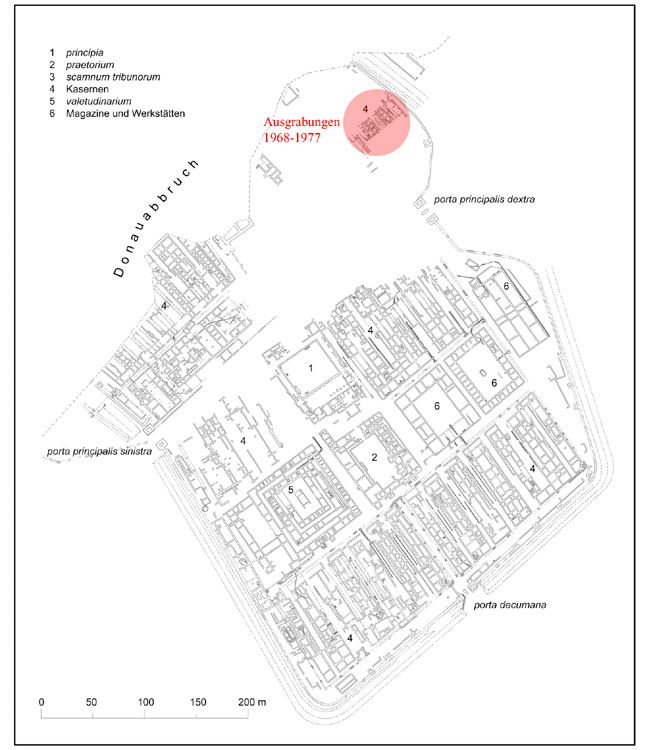
Plan of legionary fortress

Carnuntum (from Ancient Greek Καρνοῦς (Carnous) according to Ptolemy) was a Roman legionary fortress (Latin: castra legionis) and headquarters of the Pannonian fleet from 50 AD. After the 1st century, it was capital of the Pannonia Superior province. It also became a large city of approximately 50,000 inhabitants.

Its impressive remains are situated on the Danube in Lower Austria halfway between Vienna and Bratislava in the Carnuntum Archaeological Park extending over an area of 10 km^{2} (3.9 sq mi) near today's villages of Petronell-Carnuntum and Bad Deutsch-Altenburg.

== History ==
=== Military history ===
Carnuntum first occurs in history during the reign of Augustus (6 AD), when Tiberius made it his base of operations as a Roman fort (castrum) in the campaigns against Maroboduus (Marbod).

==== Legio XV Apollinaris ====
Significant Romanisation happened when the town was selected as the garrison of the Legio XV Apollinaris before 14 AD. A few years later, it became the centre of the Roman fortifications along the Danube from Vindobona (now Vienna) to Brigetio (Ó-Szőny). According to Tacitus, the emperor Claudius ordered the governor of Pannonia "to have a legion with an auxiliary on the bank of the Danube" to protect the losers of a dispute between Germanic tribes (the Quadi and Marcomanni) and deter the victors from the temptation to invade Pannonia. To this period (about 50 AD) belongs the auxiliary castrum of a cavalry ala 1.5 kilometres (0.93 mi) south-west of the legionary fortress.

In 71 AD, after several campaigns, the Legio XV Apollinaris returned to Carnuntum and rebuilt its fortress. While some of the legion fought in Trajan's Dacian Wars, the main body of the legion remained in Pannonia.

==== Legio X Gemina ====
Legio X Gemina was sent to Carnuntum for a few years from about 63 AD. During the brief reign of Galba (68–69), it was transferred back to Hispania.

==== Legio VII Gemina ====
Legio VII Gemina, newly founded by Galba in 68 AD, was allocated to Carnuntum until about 71 AD after his defeat by Vespasian.

==== Legio XIV Gemina ====
In 117–118 AD, Carnuntum became the permanent quarters of Legio XIV Gemina where it stayed for three centuries until the frontier collapsed in 430.

=== History of the city ===
In Roman times, Carnuntum had a history as a major trading centre for amber, brought from the north to traders who sold it in Italy; the main arm of the Amber Road crossed the Danube at Carnuntum.

As Aelium Carnuntum, the capital of Pannonia Superior, it was made a municipium by Hadrian. Its importance is indicated by the fact that Marcus Aurelius resided there for three years (172–175) during the war against the Marcomanni, and wrote part of his Meditations there. Also Septimius Severus, at the time governor of Pannonia, was proclaimed emperor there by his soldiers (193), to replace Emperor Pertinax, who had been murdered.

In the Severan dynasty (193–235), Carnuntum experienced an economic boom, the canabae reaching their maximum size. Caracalla elevated it to colony status as Septimia Colonia Aurelia Antoniana. During the reign of Gallienus, the Pannonians rebelled by electing the usurper Regalianus, who established a mint with coins depicted him and his wife Sulpicia Dryantilla. He was killed shortly afterwards by his own soldiers, probably at Carnuntum.

In 308, during the Civil wars of the Tetrarchy, the Emperor emeritus Diocletian chaired a historic meeting there, the Conference of Carnuntum, with his co-emperors Maximian and Galerius, to solve the rising tensions within the tetrarchy.

Around 350 Carnuntum suffered severe earthquake damage.

In 374, it was destroyed by Germanic invaders, the Quadi and Iazyges. Although partly restored by Valentinian I, it never regained its former importance, and Vindobona became the chief military centre. During the Barbarian Invasions, Carnuntum was eventually abandoned and used as a cemetery and source of building material for building projects elsewhere. Eventually, its remains became buried and forgotten.

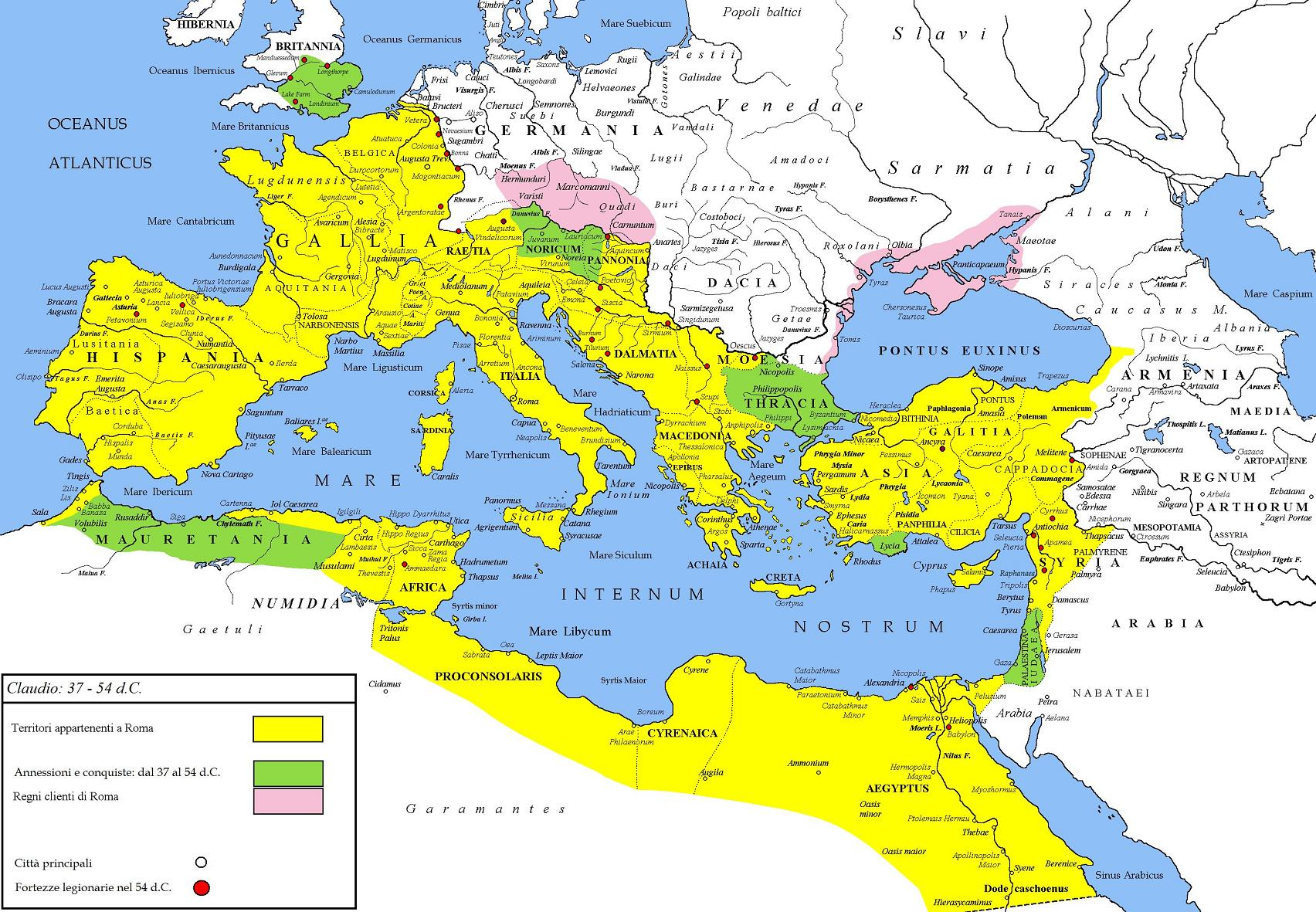
Map of Roman legions in 50 AD: Legio XV Apollinaris at Carnuntum

== Today ==
The Archaeological Park Carnuntum comprises three sites:

- Museum, Heidentor and amphitheatre near Petronell
- Excavations in the garden of Petronell Castle
- Museum Carnuntinum

=== Civilian city ===
Aerial view of the open-air museum

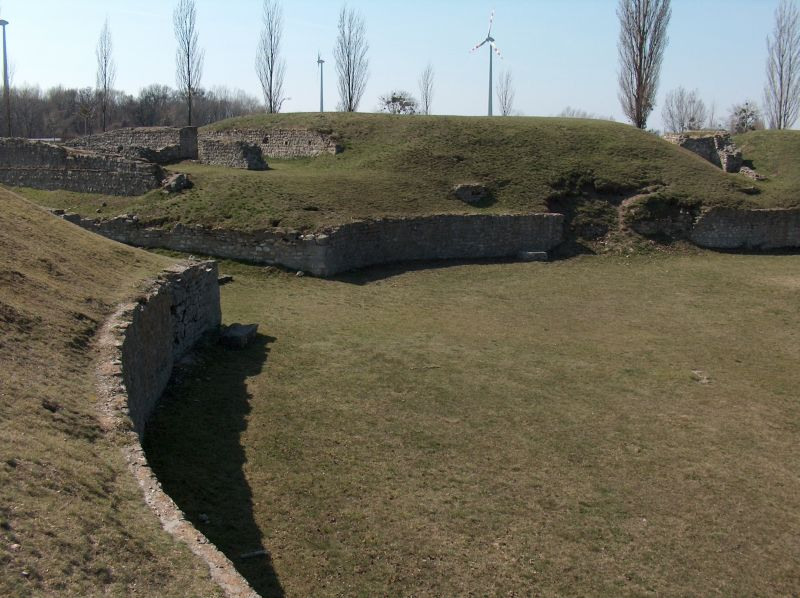
Remains in Carnuntum – the amphitheatre

The remains of the civilian city extend around the village of Petronell-Carnuntum. There are several places to see in the city: a Roman city quarter in the open-air museum, palace ruins, an amphitheatre, and the Heidentor, the ruins of a Roman triumphal arch.

The Roman city ruins are exposed in the open-air museum directly in the present village. One of the ancient houses, called the House of Lucius, has been rebuilt using traditional techniques. It was opened to the public on 1 June 2006.

The forum was next to the palace ruins, also referred to as the large public baths.

Some way outside the city was a large amphitheatre, which had room for about 15,000 spectators.

A plate with an inscription found at the site claims that this building was the fourth-largest amphitheatre in the whole Roman Empire.

=== Heidentor ===
Between 354 AD and 361 AD, a huge triumphal monument was erected next to the camp and city. Contemporary reports suggest that Emperor Constantius II had it built to commemorate his victories. When the remains of Carnuntum disappeared after the Migration Period the monument remained as an isolated building in a natural landscape and led Medieval people to believe it was the tomb of a pagan giant. Hence, they called it Heidentor ('Heathens' Gate' or 'Pagans' Gate').

=== Fortress ===
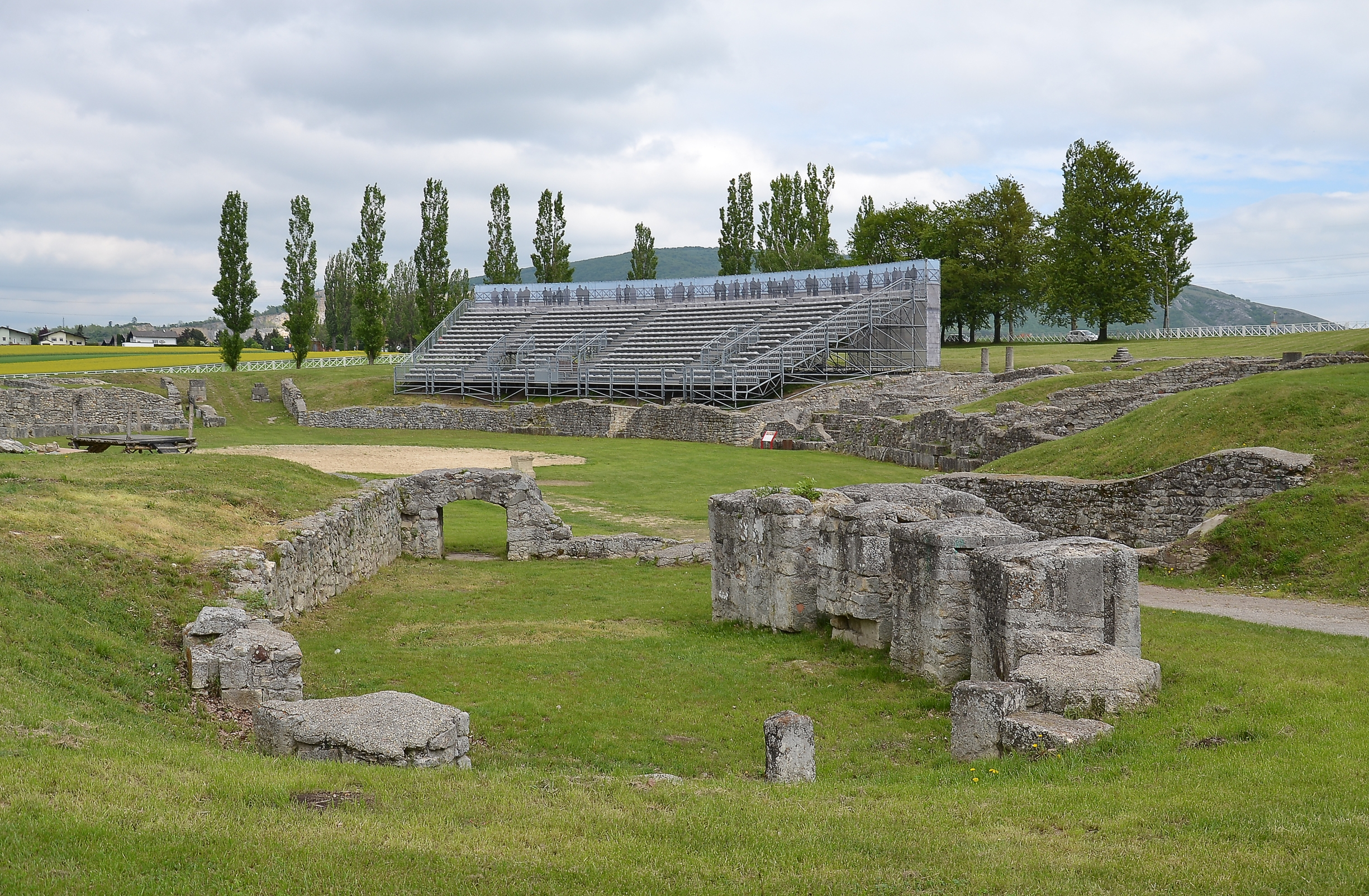
Remains of the fortress – amphitheatre

The only remaining building of the fortress is an amphitheatre, located just outside the fortress. Today, a small adjacent museum shows the history of gladiators.

== Culture ==
The World Theatre Festival Art Carnumtum (German: Art Carnuntum Welttheater Festival) is held each year in the ancient amphitheatre. Art Carnuntum is a cultural organisation that aims support the cultural and philosophical heritage of Europe and promotes classical drama in both traditional and contemporary styles. The festival was founded around 1988 by the Italian artist Piero Bordin, who died suddenly in March 2021. Since 2021 Constantina Bordin is the new artistic director. Collaborators from Greece include Irini Pappas, Michalis Kakogianis, and Theodoros Terzopoulus, and the popular festival has become known as an international centre for ancient drama as well as European classical and modern music.

The festival was held in August in 2021.

=== Gladiator school ===
In September 2011 aerial photographs and ground-penetrating radar led to the discovery of the typical contours of an ancient Roman gladiator school to the south of the Roman settlement, a ludus rivaling the Ludus Magnus school and covering an area of some 3,350 square yards (0.280 ha). This approach of aerial photography and modern remote sensing has allowed for a detailed virtual recreation of the gladiator school. The aerial photographs used in the recreation were acquired with a radio-controlled Microdrone md4-1000 quadrocopter, which captured a sufficient number of photographs to create an overlap among them. Then, using a technique called structure from motion (SfM), a 3D model of the school was calculated using the sharpest images.

The school, along with the amphitheater, was located outside of the town's walls. The school had training grounds, bathing facilities, an assembly hall and dormitories for the gladiators. The school also had a courtyard which housed a training area for gladiators. The school was attached to an open campus which was most likely used for chariot races.

=== Museum Carnuntinum ===
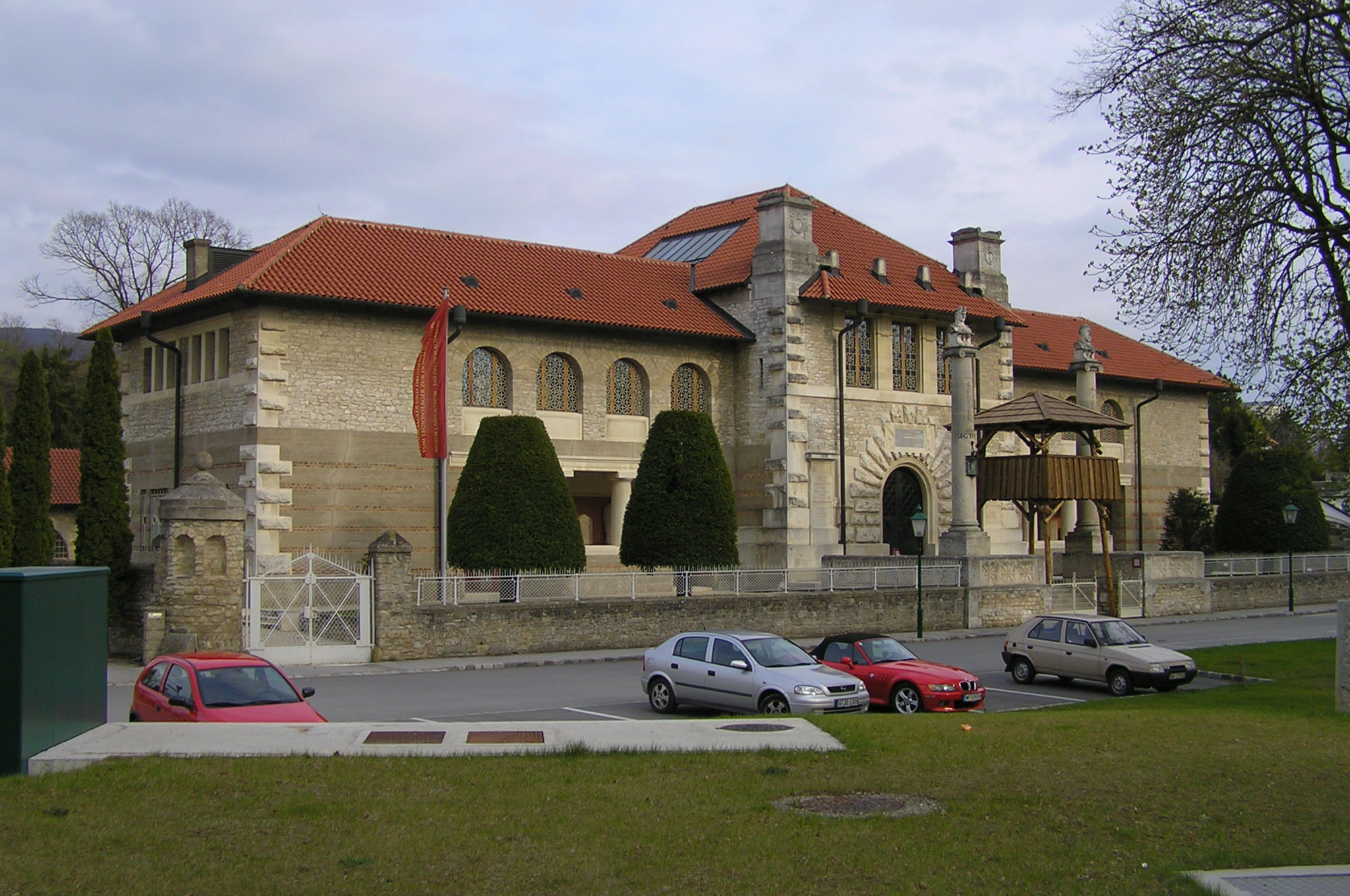
Museum Carnuntinum

The archaeological museum Carnuntinum, which is situated in the village of Bad Deutsch-Altenburg on the river Danube, exhibits important archaeological finds from the ancient city.

== In fiction ==
Völkisch author Guido von List was so impressed with the ruins that he based his first novel, Carnuntum, on the subject. Another novel, Household Gods, by Harry Turtledove and Judith Tarr, is set in Carnuntum during the reign of Marcus Aurelius, from the point of view of a modern American time traveler.

In Frank Tallis's crime novel Vienna Blood, both Guido von List and his novel Carnuntum appear, together with an eponymous opera based on the novel.

== Gallery ==
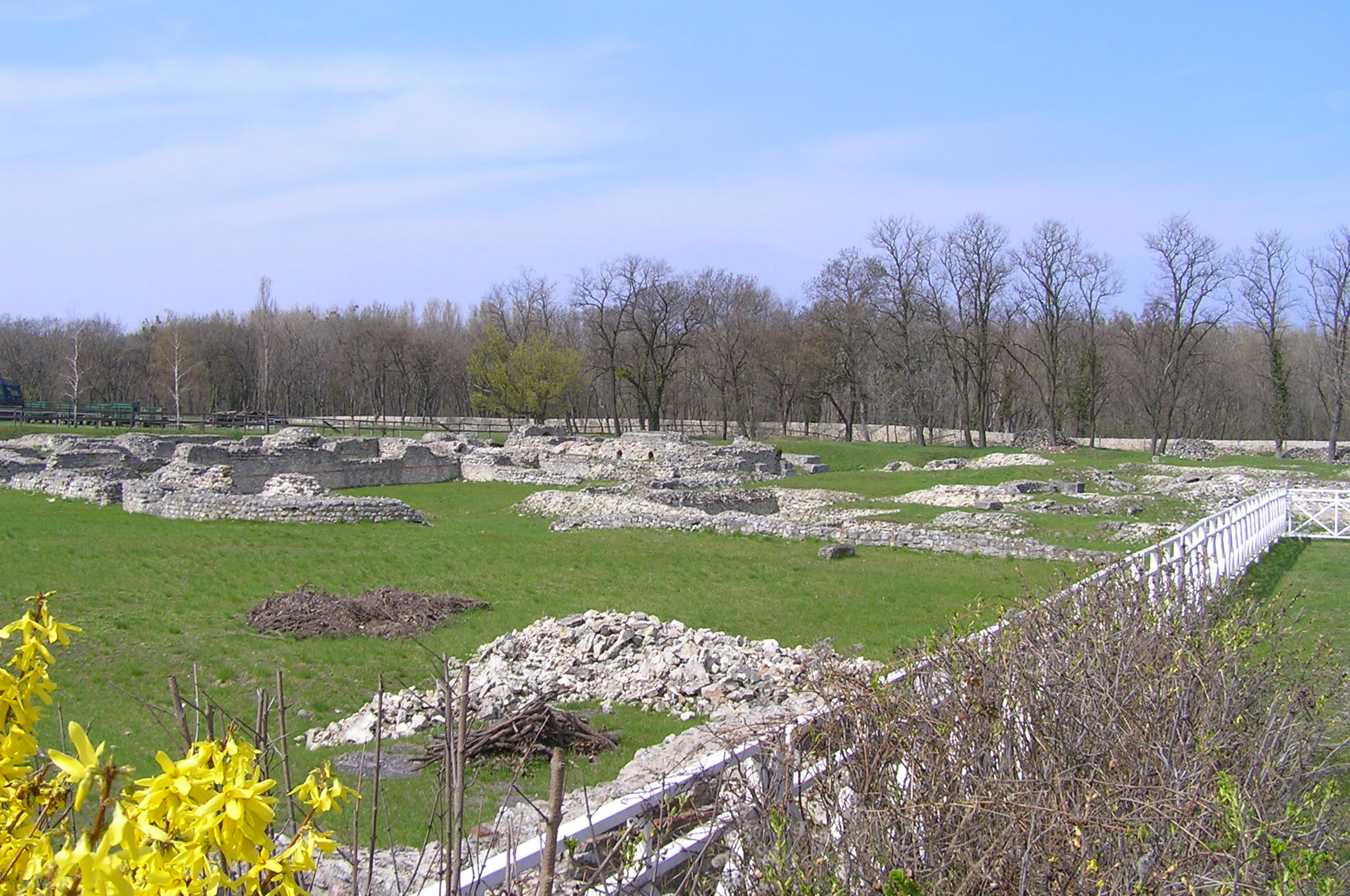
The palace ruins near Petronell

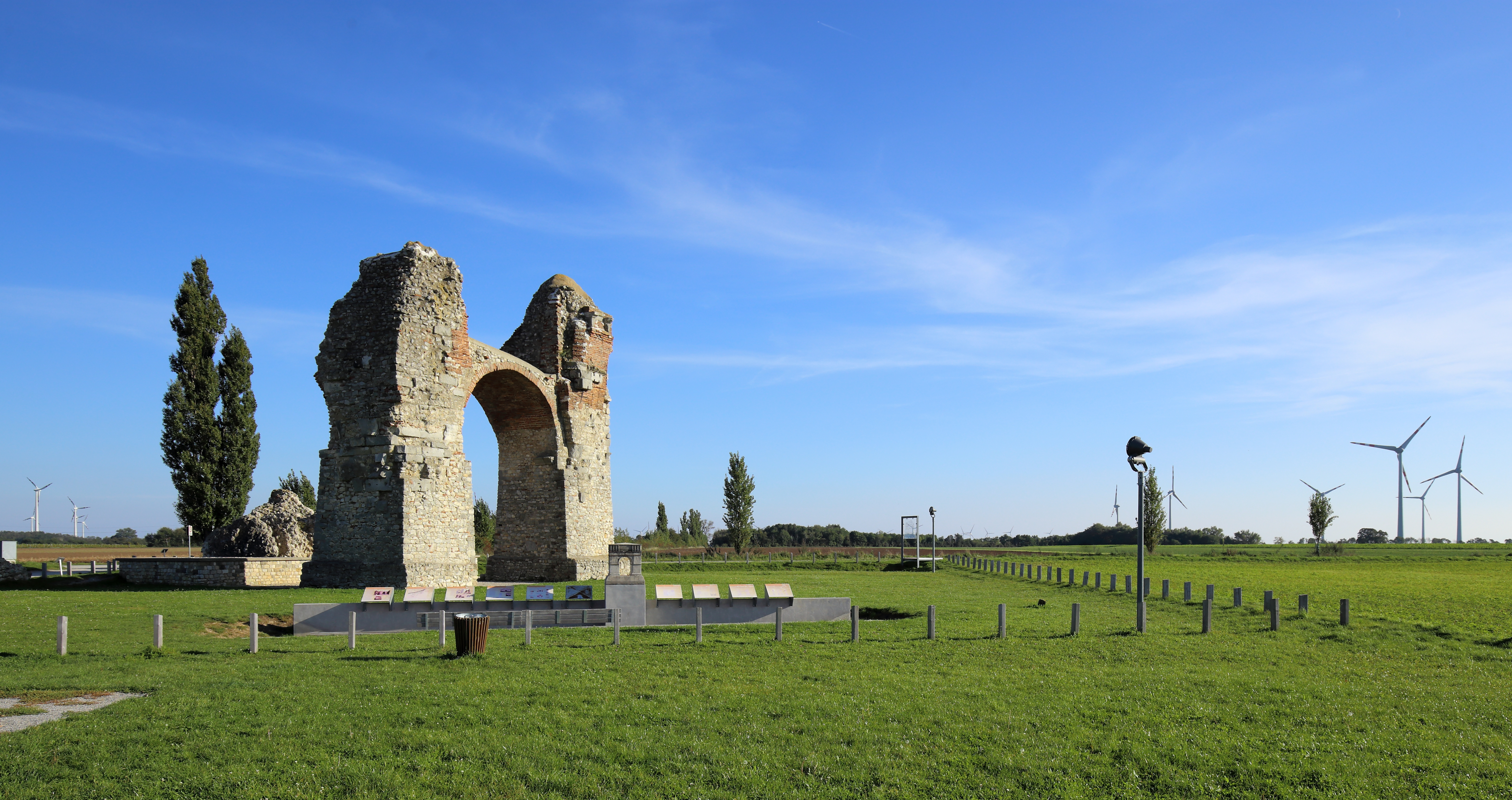
Heidentor (so-called Heathens' Gate)

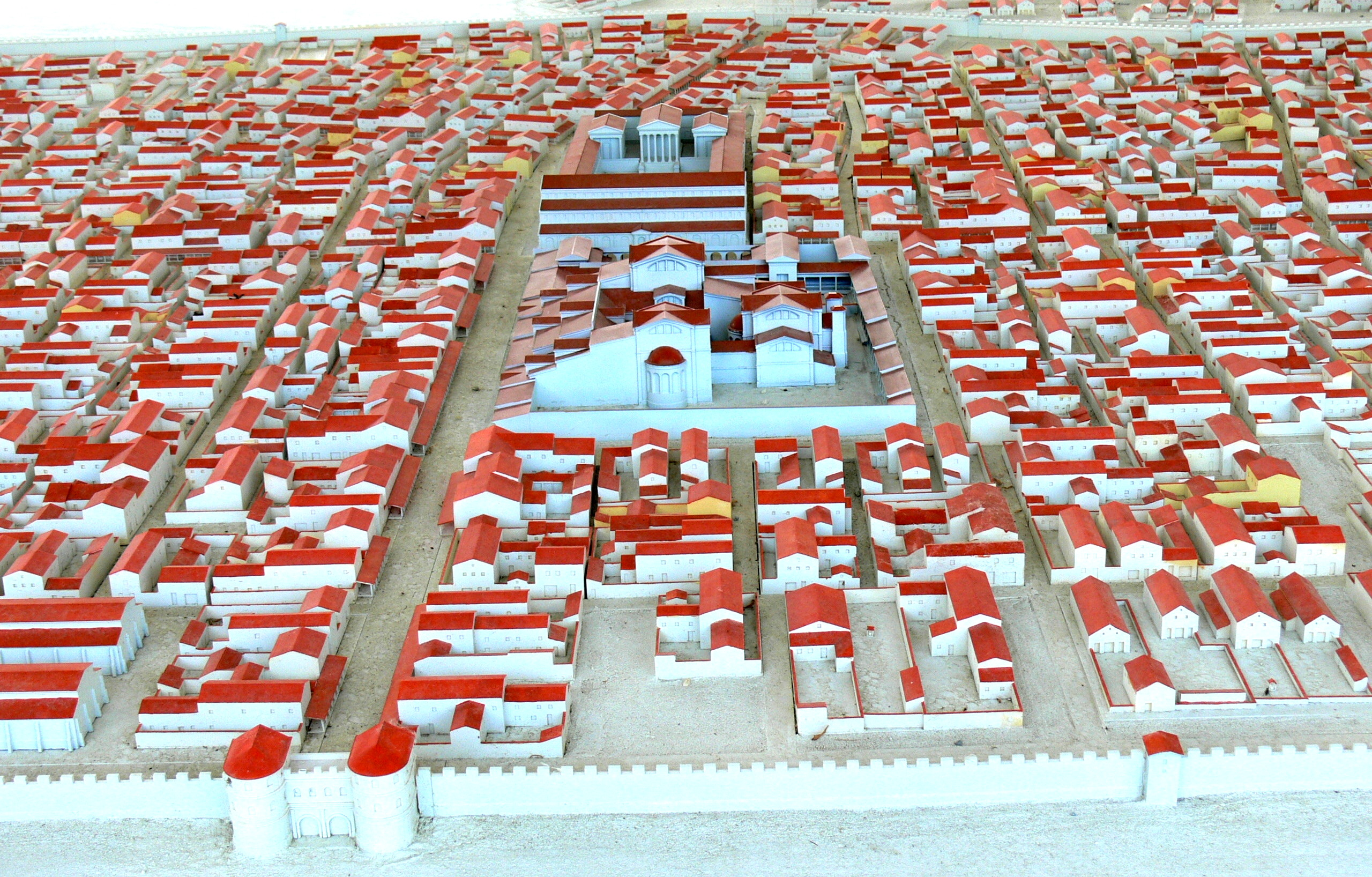
Scale Model of Carnuntum in Roman times

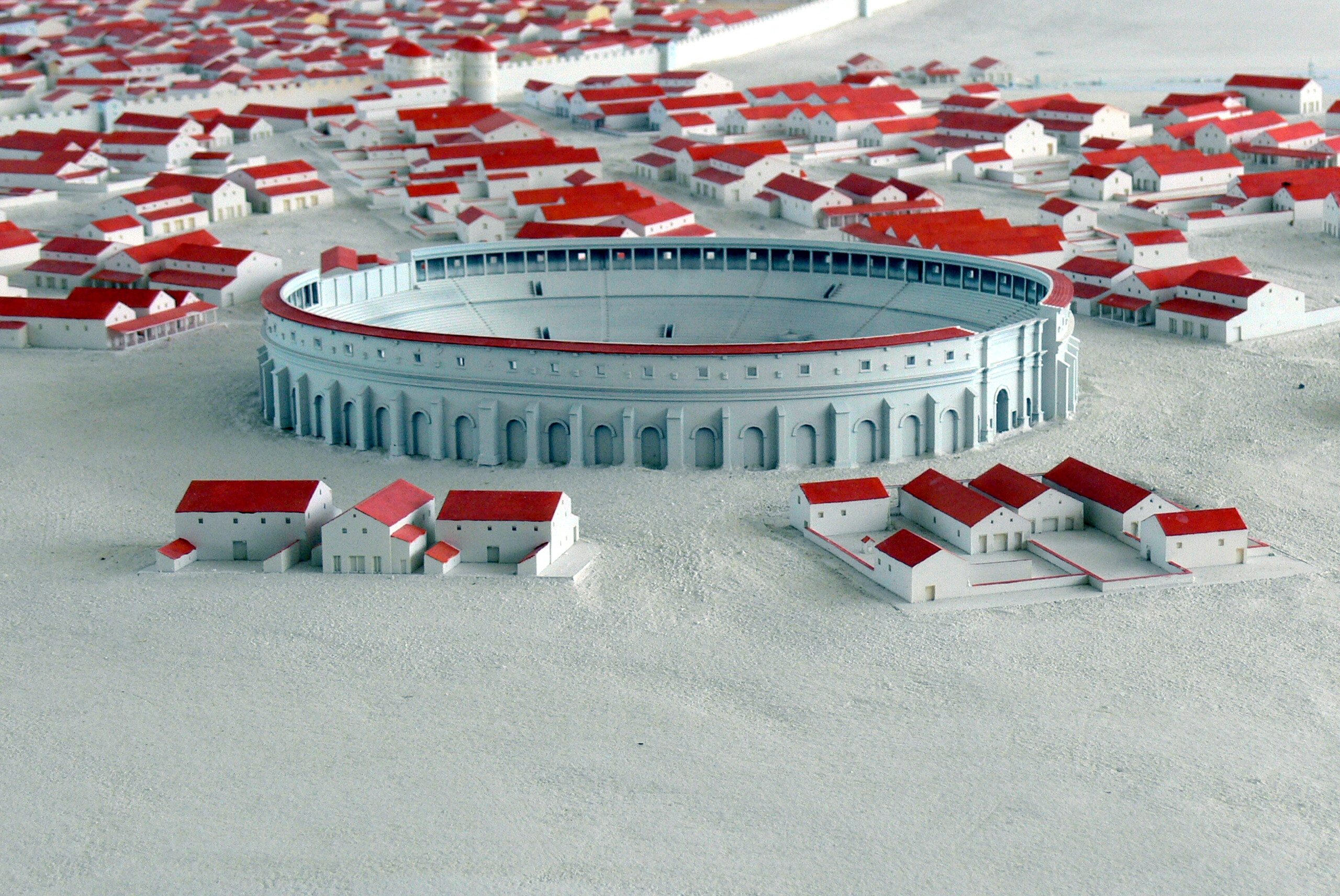
Scale Model of Carnuntum in Roman times (amphitheatre and region outside city walls)

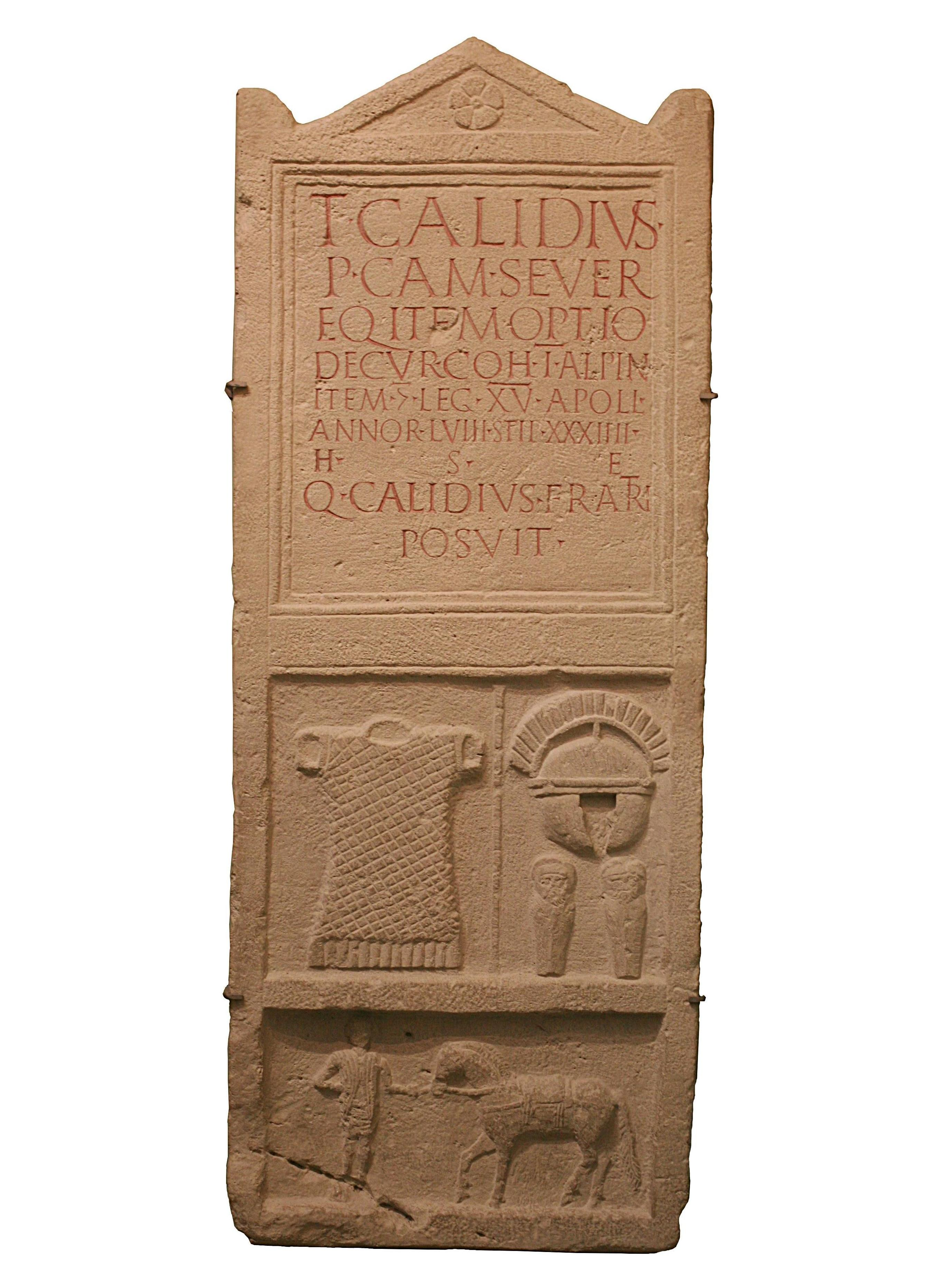
Tombstone of Titus Calidius Severus, centurion of the Fifteenth Legion, depicting a horse, centurion's helmet and armour, found in Carnuntum

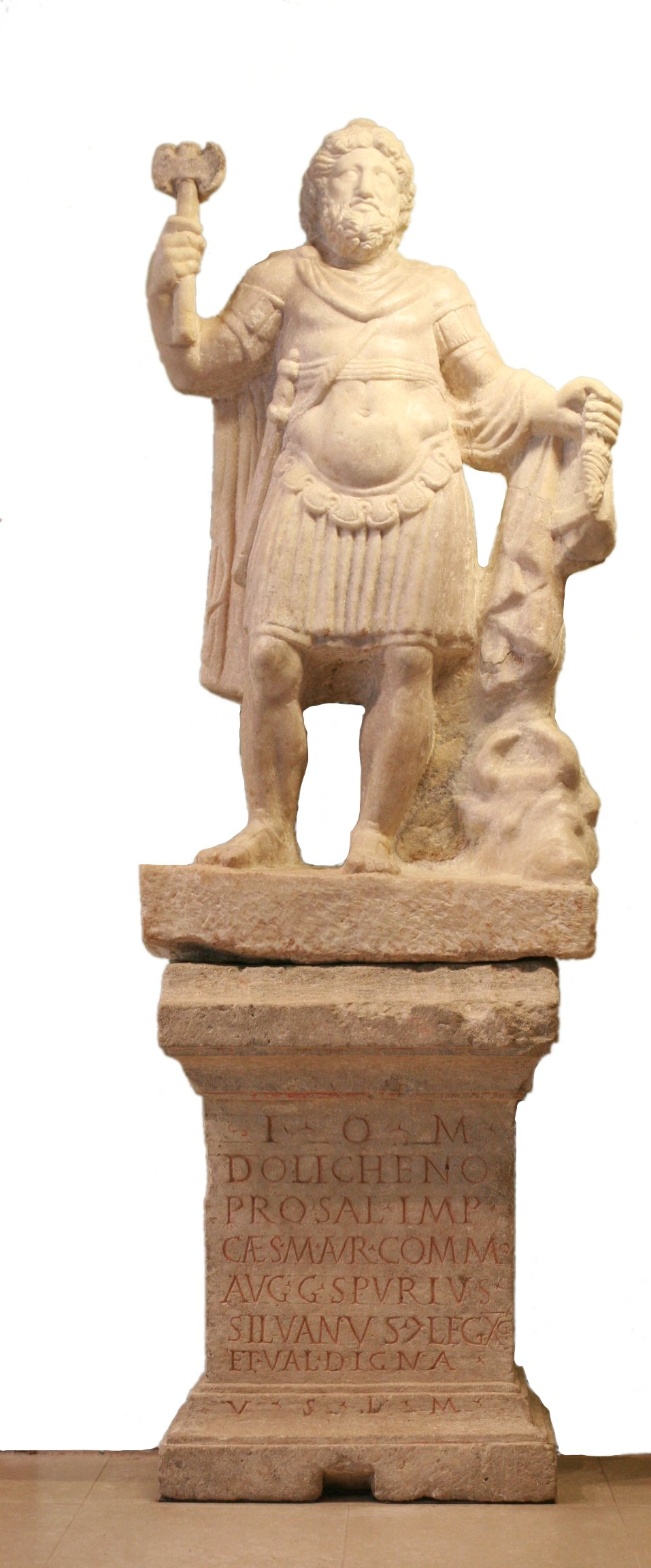
Statue of the god Jupiter Dolichenus

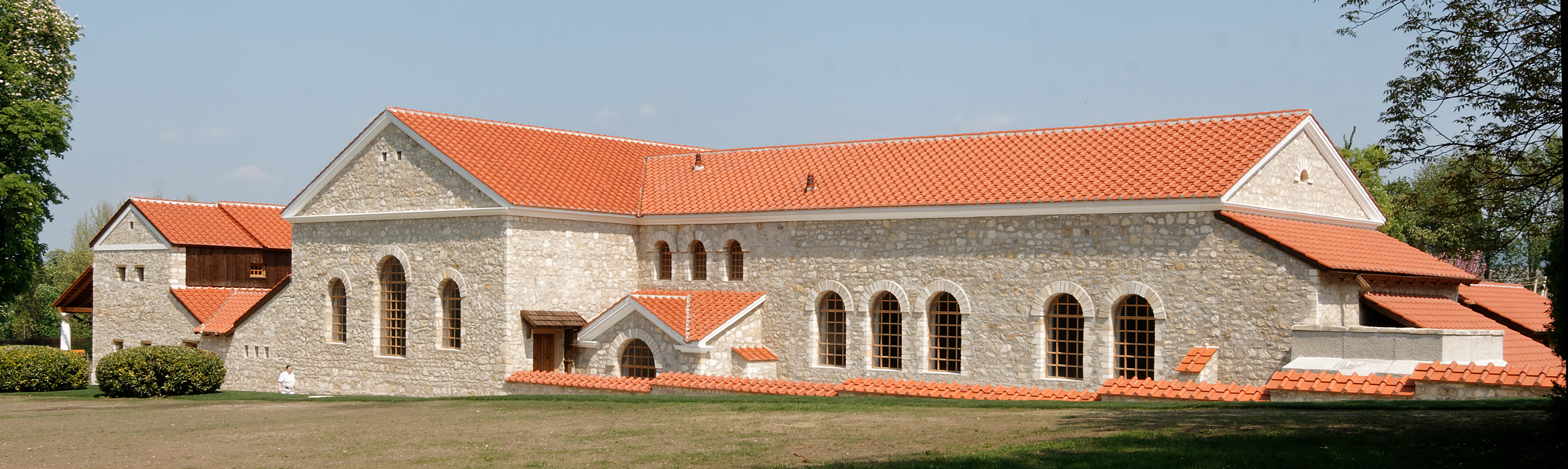
Reconstructed Thermae
