= Heidentor =

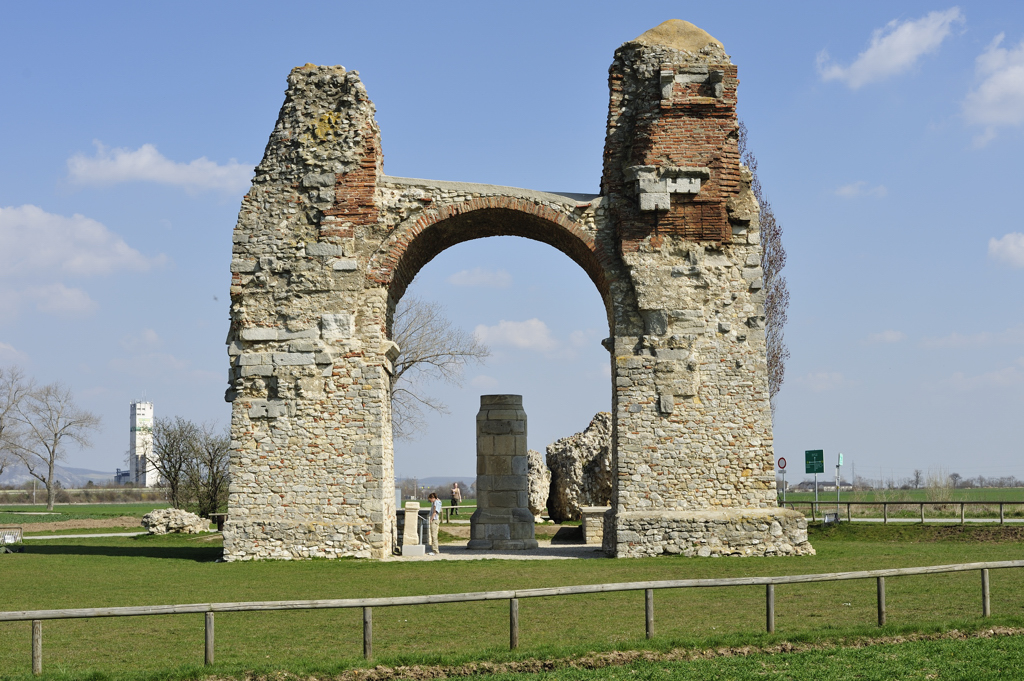
- Remaining arch and plinth
- Interactive map of Heidentor
- Location: Petronell-Carnuntum, Austria
- Coordinates: 48°6′14.4″N 16°51′15.5″E
- Type: Roman triumphal arch

The Heidentor, also known as Heathens' Gate or Pagans' Gate, is the partially reconstructed ruin of a triumphal arch of the Roman Empire, located in what was the fort-city of Carnuntum, in present-day Austria. Originally tetrapylon in form, only one of its four arches remains.

== History ==
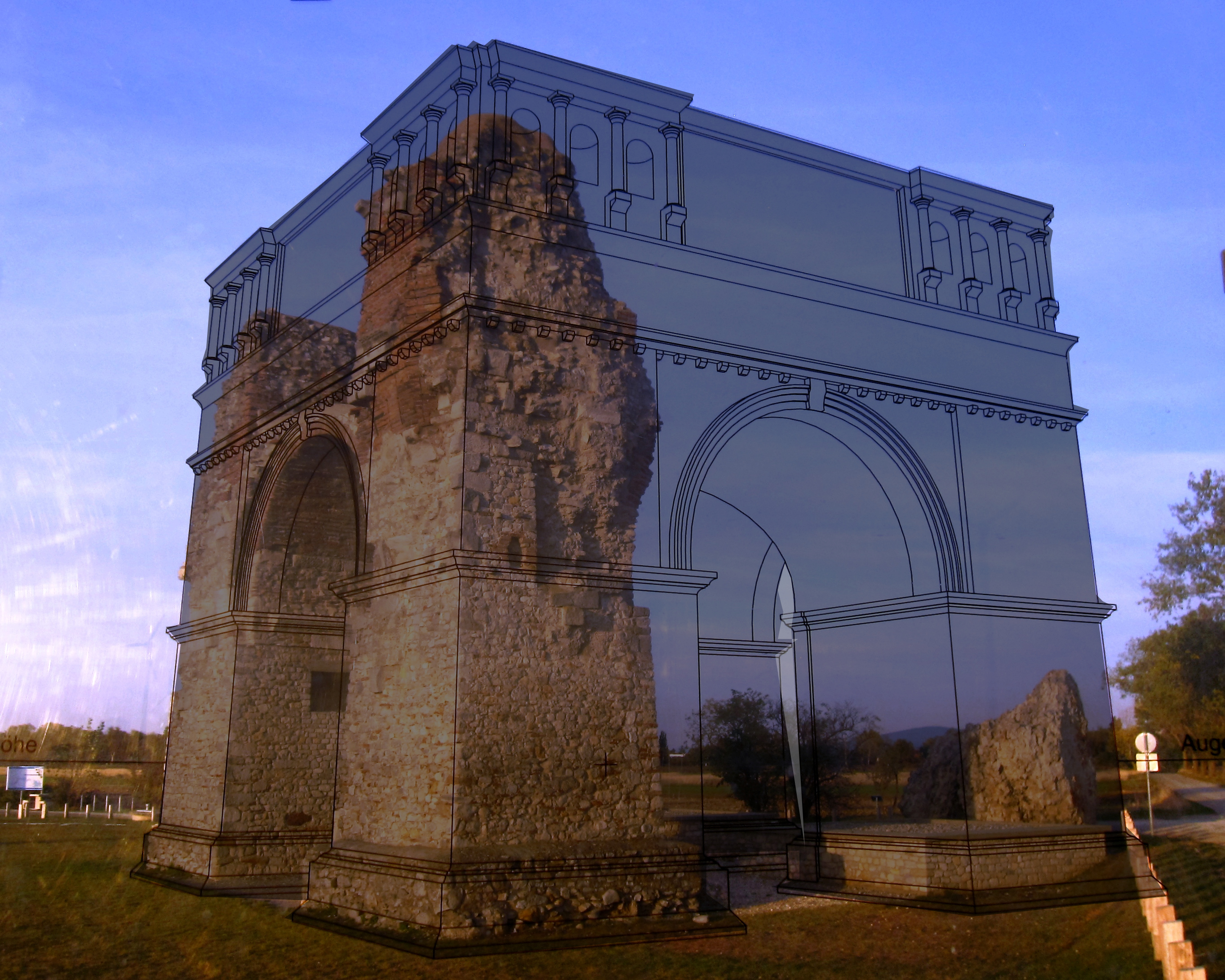
Presumed structure superimposed on present ruins

Located nearly 900 metres (3,000 ft) south of the urban core of Carnuntum, a former Roman city with a population of around 50,000, counting legionary forces stationed around it. It was a four-sided structure, presumably of four arches, and estimated to have been erected during the reign of Emperor Constantius II (351–361 AD). These tetrapylons were often built to celebrate some victory by the local army. Each facade of the structure was likely 14.5 metres (48 ft) wide. A plinth in the centre probably held a statue of either a god or emperor.

The locals in subsequent centuries referred to the structure as a gate for the Roman city.

== See also ==
- List of Roman triumphal arches
