= Invaders from the Dark =

1960 novel by Greye La Spina

- Dust-jacket illustration by Gary Gore.
- Author: Greye La Spina
- Cover artist: Gary Gore
- Language: English
- Genre: Horror
- Publisher: Arkham House
- Publication date: 1960
- Publication place: United States
- Media type: Print (Hardback)
- Pages: 168

Invaders from the Dark is a horror novel by American writer Greye La Spina. It was published by Arkham House in 1960 in an edition of 1,559 copies. It was La Spina's first and only hardcover book.

The novel was originally serialized in Weird Tales magazine. It appeared in the April, May and June, 1925 issues.

The novel was reprinted in paperback by Paperback Library in 1966 under the title Shadow of Evil.

== Plot summary ==
The story is set in Brooklyn, New York in the mid-1920s and deals with the widow of an Occultist, Portia Differdale, and Princess Tchernova, a wealthy and beautiful Russian werewolf. Both women desire the same man, Owen Edwardes.

== Sources ==
- Jaffery, Sheldon (1989). The Arkham House Companion. Mercer Island, WA: Starmont House, Inc. pp. 54–55. ISBN 1-55742-005-X.
- Chalker, Jack L.; Mark Owings (1998). The Science-Fantasy Publishers: A Bibliographic History, 1923-1998. Westminster, MD and Baltimore: Mirage Press, Ltd. p. 37.
- Joshi, S.T. (1999). Sixty Years of Arkham House: A History and Bibliography. Sauk City, WI: Arkham House. p. 69. ISBN 0-87054-176-5.
- Nielsen, Leon (2004). Arkham House Books: A Collector's Guide. Jefferson, NC and London: McFarland & Company, Inc. p. 80. ISBN 0-7864-1785-4.
