= Greye La Spina =

American dramatist

- Born: July 10, 1880; Wakefield, Massachusetts, US
- Died: September 17, 1969 (aged 89)
- Occupations: Writer, playwright
- Writing career
- Pen name: Isra Putnam
- Period: 1919 to 1926
- Genres: horror, Fantasy, Detective fiction

Greye La Spina (July 10, 1880 – September 17, 1969) was an American writer who published more than one hundred short stories, serials, novelettes, and one-act plays. Her stories appeared in Metropolitan, Black Mask, Action Stories, Ten-Story Book, The Thrill Book, Weird Tales, Modern Marriage, Top-Notch Magazine, All-Story, Photoplay, and many other magazines.

== Biography ==
La Spina was born Fanny Greye Bragg on July 10, 1880, in Wakefield, Massachusetts. Her father was Lorenzo Dow Bragg, a Methodist clergyman, and her mother was Ella Celia Perkins. She was married to Ralph Emil Geissler on 5 June 1898 and gave birth to a daughter, Celia, two years later (1900). The following year, her husband died. In 1910 she married Robert La Spina, Baron di Savuto, an Italian aristocrat.

Her first supernatural story, "The Wolf on the Steppes" was sold to Thrill Book in 1919. She won second place in Photoplay magazine's 1921 short story contest gaining her a $2,500 prize.

Her first and only hardcover book, the novel, Invaders from the Dark, was published by Arkham House in 1960. From Beyond Press issued a collection of her work including the serial novel Fettered in 2023.

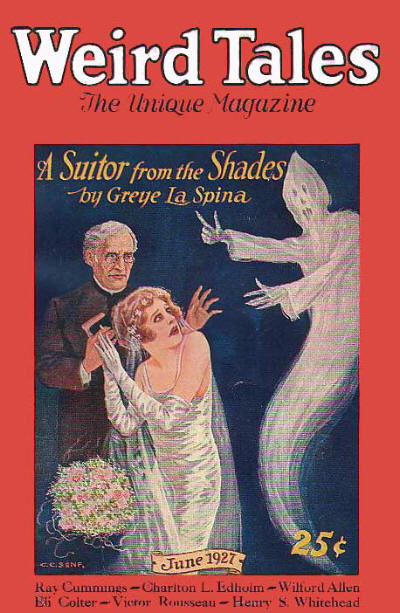
La Spina's "A Suitor from the Shades" was the cover story in the June 1927 Weird Tales

== Selected short stories ==
- "The Ultimate Ingredient" (Thrill Book, 1919)
- "A Seat on the Platform" (Photoplay, April 1921)
- "The Tortoise-Shell Cat" (Weird Tales, November 1924)
- "The Scarf of the Beloved" (Weird Tales, February 1925)
- "The Gargoyle" (Weird Tales, September - November 1925)
- "The Devil's Pool" (Weird Tales, June 1932)
- "The Sinister Painting" (Weird Tales, September 1934)
- "Death Has Red Hair" (Weird Tales, September 1942)
- "Great Pan Is Here" (Weird Tales, November 1943)
- "The Antimacassar" (Weird Tales, May 1949)
- "Old Mr. Wiley" (Weird Tales, March 1951)
