= Hồ Anh Thái =

Vietnamese writer

- Born: 1960; Hanoi, Vietnam
- Occupation: Novelist

Hồ Anh Thái (born 1960) is a Vietnamese novelist.

== Biography ==
Ho Anh Thai was born in 1960 in Hanoi. He graduated from Hanoi University of Diplomacy in 1983. After graduation, he worked as a diplomat abroad, especially in India, Iran and Indonesia. Fluent in several foreign languages, he earned a Ph.D. in Oriental Studies. He is also an Indologist and a visiting professor at the University of Washington and other foreign universities.

Ho Anh Thai was elected president of the Hanoi Writers’ Association from 2000 to 2010. He was appointed Vietnam Deputy Ambassador to Iran from 2011 to 2015, and to Indonesia from 2015 to 2018.

== Literary career ==
Ho Anh Thai gained recognition as a teenage author with his early publications, which primarily focused on the experiences and quests of youth. His notable works from this initial period include the novels Men and Vehicle Run in the Moonlight (1986), The Women on the Island (1986), and Behind the Red Mist (1989), as well as short story collections like The Goat Meat Special (1988) and Fragment of a Man (1991).

In the early 1990s, Thai transitioned to a more autobiographical narrative style, encapsulating his six-year residency in India through a series of comedic tales, including The Man Who Stood on One Leg and The Barter.

By the 2000s, his oeuvre shifted towards experimental and often controversial themes. His novels from this period—The Apocalypse Hotel (2002), Ten and One Nights (2006), RHT is Rat Hunt Team (2011), Erased by the Wind (2012), His Children are Scattered on the Road (2014), Burning Van Gogh (2018), and Five Letters of Credence (2019)—exemplify this evolution. Additionally, he produced short story collections such as The Narration of 265 Days (2001), Four Paths to the Fun House (2004), and Man is Here and the Sky is There (2013).

Thai revisited the theme of Indian culture with his 2007 novel The Buddha, Savitri and I, which is noted as the first Vietnamese novel to contemporize Buddhist themes within a multi-layered narrative structure that adeptly manipulates chronological and spatial dimensions. In 2022, he published The Buddha, the Robber Queen and the Spy, further exploring ancient Indian narratives.

His literary contributions have garnered international attention, with translations in over ten languages, including English, French, Korean, and Swedish, reflecting a robust global reach and cultural resonance.

== Selected works ==
- Người đàn bà trên đảo (The Women on the Island, 1988)
- Mai phục trong đêm hè (Ambush in the Summer Nights, 1989)
- Trong sương hồng hiện ra (Behind the Red Mist, 1990)

== Awards ==
- Short story prize 1983-1984 of Van Nghe (Literature and Arts) newspaper for The Boy Who Waits at the Bus-stop.
- Best novel award (5-year award, 1986–1990) of the Vietnam Writers’ Association and the Vietnam Trade Union for Men and Vehicle Run in the Moonlight.
- Literature award 1995 of the Union of Literature and Art Associations for The Man Who Stood on One Leg.
- Annual prize 2002 of the Vietnam Writers’ Association for The Narration in 265 Days (refused by author).
- Annual Prize 2012 for the Best Novel of Ha Noi Writers' Association for RHT is Rat Hunt Team.
- Book Prize 2015 of Vietnam Publishers' Association for the novel His Children are Scattered on the Road.
- Book Prize 2016 of IRED and Phan Chau Trinh Culture Foundation for the novel Apocalypse Hotel.
