= The Stone Roses (novel) =

1959 novel

- First edition (UK)
- Author: Sarah Gainham
- Language: English
- Genre: Spy Thriller
- Publisher: Eyre and Spottiswoode
- Publication date: 1959
- Publication place: United Kingdom
- Media type: Print

The Stone Roses is a 1959 spy thriller novel by the British writer Sarah Gainham. It is set in Prague shortly after the Communist coup in Czechoslovakia.

== Synopsis ==
In 1948 an agent goes missing in Czechoslovakia, British spy Toby Elyat is sent in under cover as a newspaper reporter to try and locate him. Before long he is entangled with the operatives of the Soviet intelligence agency MGB.

== Bibliography ==
- Burton, Alan. Historical Dictionary of British Spy Fiction. Rowman & Littlefield, 2016.
- Reilly, John M. Twentieth Century Crime & Mystery Writers. Springer, 2015.
