= Night Falls on the City =

1967 novel

- First edition (UK)
- Author: Sarah Gainham
- Language: English
- Genre: Drama
- Publisher: William Collins, Sons (UK); Holt Rinehart (US)
- Publication date: 1967
- Publication place: United Kingdom
- Media type: Print
- Followed by: A Place in the Country

Night Falls on the City is a 1967 novel by the British writer Sarah Gainham. A commercial and critical success, it was the first of her Vienna trilogy followed by A Place in the Country (1969) and Private Worlds (1971). Marking a change from the series of spy thrillers she produced in the 1950s, it remains her best-known work

== Synopsis ==
Julia Homburg, daughter of a former Habsburg official, is an actress with the Austrian Burgtheater living through the last days of interwar Austria before the Anschluss of 1938 dramatically changes her life. In the wake of the Nazi takeover her husband Jewish politician Franz Wedeker is forced to go into hiding.

== Bibliography ==
- Burton, Alan. Historical Dictionary of British Spy Fiction. Rowman & Littlefield, 2016.
- Reilly, John M. Twentieth Century Crime & Mystery Writers. Springer, 2015.
