= Petronell-Carnuntum =

Place in Lower Austria, Austria

- Municipality
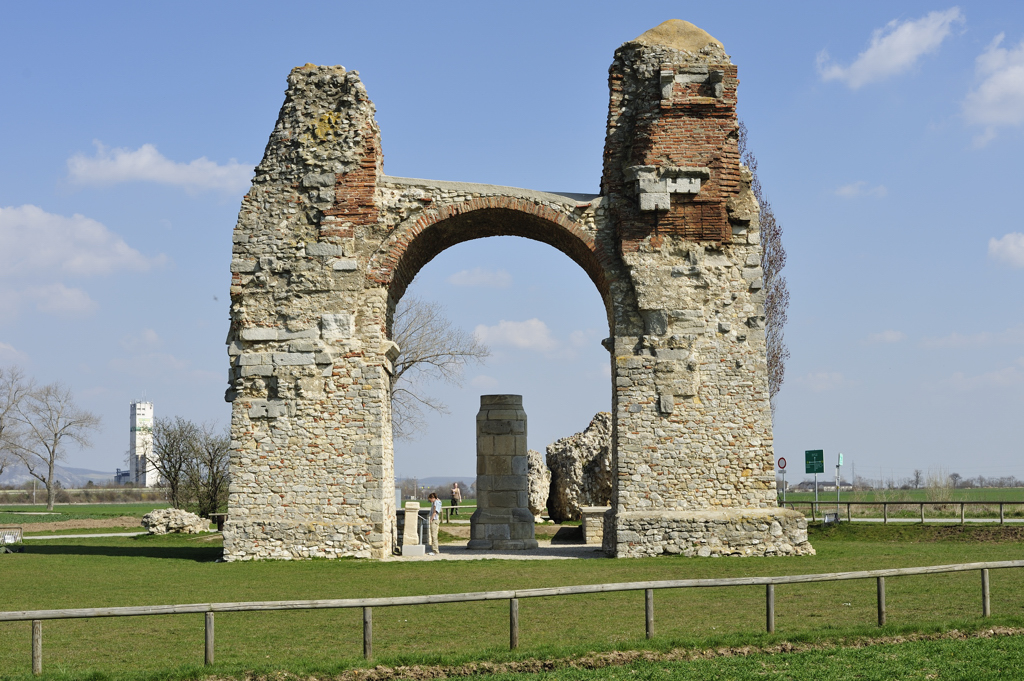
- The Heidentor in Petronell Carnuntum

- Flag Coat of arms

- Location within Austria
- Coordinates: 48°7′N 16°51′E
- Country: Austria
- State: Lower Austria
- District: Bruck an der Leitha

Government
  - Mayor: Martin Almstädter (SPÖ)

Area
  - Total: 25.37 km^{2} (9.80 sq mi)
- Elevation: 175 m (574 ft)

Population (2018-01-01)
  - Total: 1,245
  - Density: 49.07/km^{2} (127.1/sq mi)
- Time zone: UTC+1 (CET)
  - Summer (DST): UTC+2 (CEST)
- Postal code: 2404
- Area code: 02163
- Website: www.petronell.at

Petronell-Carnuntum is a community of Bruck an der Leitha in Austria. It is known for its proximity to the former Roman fort of Carnuntum.

== History ==
The village derives the second half of its name, Carnuntum, from the ancient Roman legionary fortress and headquarters of the Pannonian fleet from 50 AD, and later a large city of 50,000 inhabitants.

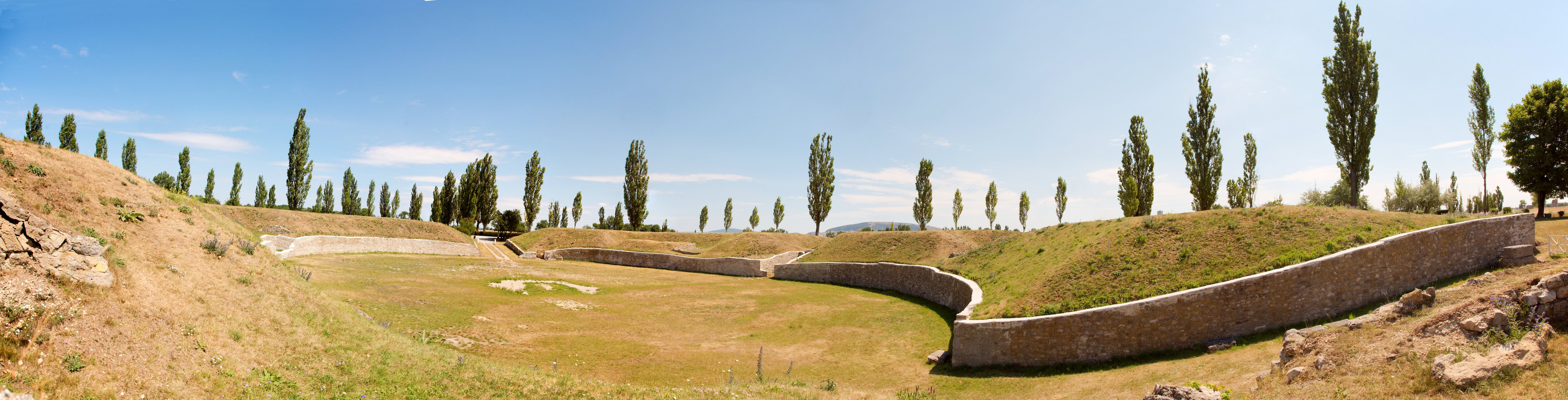
Carnuntum Amphiteater

A 2000-year-old amphitheatre, which was built outside the city walls around the late 2nd century is still partly standing. The arena was originally surrounded by stadium seating for 13,000 spectators. A hexagonal basin, speculated to be a baptismal font, was built in the 4th century AD.

The Romans gave up the city in the 5th century, but the settlement remained inhabited. Agnes of Poitou (d. 1077), the widow of Emperor Henry III, gave the lands, which extended to Rohrau Castle, to Count Palatine Rapoto V of Bavaria. He possibly dedicated the local church to the patron Saint Petronilla in her honour. This gave the name to the first half of the town name, Petronell.

At the beginning of the 12th century Henry's descendant Diepold III, Margrave of Vohburg, gave the lands to Hugo von Liechtenstein (d. 1156). Hugo built Liechtenstein Castle about 45 km to the west. He was the progenitor of the House of Liechtenstein, the ruling family of the Principality of Liechtenstein. Petronell and Rohrau, which became his own property in 1142 from feudal property, remained important Liechtenstein seats during the High Middle Ages.

Schloss Petronell

After the Liechtensteiners, the lords of Kranichberg took over the property by marriage in 1306. From 1496 the estate was in the hands of different owners until it came to Ernst III of Traun by marriage in 1650 who was made Count of Abensberg-Traun in 1653. Petronell Castle was rebuilt after previous buildings (medieval castle, Renaissance castle) from 1660 to 1667 by Dominico Carlone (around 1615–1679) in the form of a four-winged castle complex for the Abensperg-Traun family in the early Baroque style. It was owned by the Abensperg-Traun family for 17 generations and was sold to a private investor in 2006.

== Geography ==
Petronell-Carnuntum lies in the Industrieviertel area of Lower Austria. About 26 percent of the municipality is forested. It lies on the southern bank of the Danube, southwest of Hainburg an der Donau.

== Transport ==
=== Trains ===
Petronell-Carnuntum Bahnhof is served by services to Rex 7 and S7 to Wolfsthal and Vienna.

== Population ==
=== Population development ===
From 1991 to 2001, both the birth balance and the migration balance were negative. After that, immigration was stronger than the negative birth balance.

== Culture ==
The World Theatre Festival Art Carnumtum (German: Art Carnuntum Welttheater Festival) is held each year in the ancient amphitheatre. Art Carnuntum is a cultural organisation that aims support the cultural and philosophical heritage of Europe and promotes classical drama in both traditional and contemporary styles. The festival was founded around 1988 by Piero Bordin, who died suddenly in March 2021. His daughter Constantina Bordin is artistic director. Collaborators from Greece include Irini Pappas, Michalis Kakogianis, and Theodoros Terzopoulus, and the popular festival has become known as an international centre for ancient drama as well as European classical and modern music.

The festival was held in August in 2021.

== Politics ==
The local council has 19 members.

- 1990: 11 SPÖ, 5 ÖVP and 3 Petronell citizens' list.
- 1994: 10 SPÖ, 5 ÖVP and 4 Petronell citizens' list.
- 1995: 8 SPÖ, 7 ÖVP and 4 Petronell citizens' list.
- 2000: 12 ÖVP, 5 SPÖ and 2 Petronell citizens' list.
- 2005: 10 ÖVP and 9 SPÖ.
- 2010: 11 ÖVP, 7 SPÖ and 1 FPÖ.
- 2015: 9 ÖVP, 9 SPÖ and 1 FPÖ.
- 2020: 11 SPÖ and 8 ÖVP.

=== Mayor ===
- 1947–1948: Franz Braun (SPÖ)
- 1948–1953: Anton Glaser (SPÖ)
- 1953–1983: Viktor Schneider (SPÖ)
- 1983–1995: Viktor Schneider jun. (SPÖ)
- 1995–2004: Sven Ladek (ÖVP)
- 2004–2017: Ingrid Scheumbauer (ÖVP)
- since May 2017: Martin Almstädter (SPÖ)
- since January 2025: Brassat Leonard, BA (ÖVP)

== See also ==
- Carnuntum
- Heidentor
- Amber Road
- Art Carnuntum
