= 1957 in literature =

This article contains information about the literary events and publications of 1957.

== Events ==
- January 10 – T. S. Eliot marries his secretary Valerie Fletcher, 30 years his junior, in a private church ceremony in London. His first wife, Vivienne Haigh-Wood, died in 1947.
- January 15 – The film Throne of Blood, a reworking of Macbeth by Akira Kurosawa (黒澤明), is released in Japan.
- March – The Cat in the Hat, written and illustrated by Theodor Geisel as 'Dr. Seuss' as a more entertaining alternative to traditional literacy primers for children, is first published in a trade edition in the United States, initially selling an average of 12,000 copies a month, a figure which rises rapidly.
- March 13 – A 1950 Japanese translation of D. H. Lawrence's Lady Chatterley's Lover by Sei Itō (伊藤整) is found on appeal to be obscene.
- March 15 – Élet és Irodalom (Life and Literature) is first published in Hungary as a literary magazine.
- March 21 – C. S. Lewis marries Joy Gresham in a Christian ceremony at her bedside in the Churchill Hospital, Oxford, England.
- March 25 – Copies of Allen Ginsberg's Howl and Other Poems (first published 1 November 1956) printed in England are seized by United States Customs Service officials in San Francisco on grounds of obscenity. On October 3, in People v. Ferlinghetti, a subsequent prosecution of publisher Lawrence Ferlinghetti in the city, the work is ruled not to be obscene.
- April – John Updike moves to Ipswich, Massachusetts, the model for the fictional New England town of Tarbox in his 1968 novel Couples.
- June 2 – Joe Orton submits The Last Days of Sodom, a novel jointly written with Kenneth Halliwell, to a publisher; it is rejected within three days and they give up working in partnership.
- July 1 – The opening performance is held at the Stratford Shakespearean Festival's Festival Theatre in Stratford, Ontario, with its thrust stage designed by Tanya Moiseiwitsch.
- July 19 – The largely autobiographical novel The Ordeal of Gilbert Pinfold by Evelyn Waugh is published.
- August 7 – Italo Calvino's letter of resignation from the Italian Communist Party appears in l'Unità.
- October – The first American Beat Generation (poets Allen Ginsberg and Peter Orlovsky) stay at the "Beat Hotel" (Hotel Rachou) in Paris.
- November 22 – Boris Pasternak's novel Doctor Zhivago is first published, in Italian translation, by Giangiacomo Feltrinelli in Milan, having been rejected for publication in the Soviet Union.
- unknown dates
  - Justine, the first novel in Lawrence Durrell's The Alexandria Quartet, is published. The last will be published in 1960.
  - Dorothy Parker begins writing book reviews for Esquire.
  - E. E. Cummings gains a special citation from the National Book Award Committee in the United States for his Poems, 1923–1954.
  - Malcolm Muggeridge is replaced by Bernard Hollowood as editor of the British Punch magazine.
  - The Harry Ransom Center for research in the humanities is founded in the University of Texas at Austin by Harry Ransom.
  - John Sandoe opens a bookshop in Chelsea, London.
  - Noh is inscribed as an Intangible Cultural Property (Japan).
  - Three neo-Grotesque sans-serif typefaces are released: Folio (designed by Konrad Bauer and Walter Baum), Neue Haas Grotesk (Max Miedinger) and Univers (Adrian Frutiger); which will influence the International Typographic Style of graphic design.

== New books ==
=== Fiction ===
- Caridad Bravo Adams – Corazón salvaje
- James Agee – A Death in the Family
- Lars Ahlin – Natt i marknadstältet (Night in the Market Tent)
- Isaac Asimov
  - Earth Is Room Enough
  - The Naked Sun
- John Bingham – Murder Off the Record
- Ray Bradbury – Dandelion Wine
- John Braine – Room at the Top
- Fredric Brown – Rogue in Space
- Pearl S. Buck – Letter from Peking
- Michel Butor – La Modification
- John Dickson Carr – Fire, Burn!
- Louis-Ferdinand Céline – Castle to Castle (D'un château l'autre)
- John Cheever – The Wapshot Chronicle
- Agatha Christie – 4:50 from Paddington
- Mark Clifton and Frank Riley – They'd Rather Be Right
- Ivy Compton-Burnett – A Father and His Fate
- Thomas B. Costain – Below the Salt
- James Gould Cozzens – By Love Possessed
- L. Sprague de Camp – Solomon's Stone
- Freeman Wills Crofts – Anything to Declare?
- Cecil Day-Lewis – End of Chapter
- Daphne du Maurier – The Scapegoat
- Lawrence Durrell – Justine
- Shusaku Endo (遠藤 周作) – The Sea and Poison (海と毒薬)
- Ian Fleming
  - The Diamond Smugglers
  - From Russia, with Love
- Janet Frame – Owls Do Cry
- Sarah Gainham
  - The Cold Dark Night
  - The Mythmaker
- Jean Giono – The Straw Man (Le Bonheur fou)
- José Giovanni – The Break (Le Trou)
- Martyn Goff – The Plaster Fabric
- Richard Gordon – Doctor in Love
- Winston Graham – Greek Fire
- L.P. Hartley – The Hireling
- Bill Hopkins – The Divine and the Decay
- Aldous Huxley – Collected Short Stories
- James Jones – Some Came Running
- Anna Kavan – Eagle's Nest
- Jack Kerouac – On the Road
- Frances Parkinson Keyes – Blue Camellia
- Christopher Landon – Ice Cold in Alex
- Halldór Laxness – The Fish Can Sing (Brekkukotsannáll)
- Chin Yang Lee – The Flower Drum Song
- Meyer Levin – Compulsion
- H. P. Lovecraft and August Derleth – The Survivor and Others
- John D. MacDonald – The Executioners
- Compton Mackenzie – Rockets Galore
- Józef Mackiewicz – Kontra
- Alistair MacLean
  - The Guns of Navarone
  - South by Java Head
- Naguib Mahfouz – Sugar Street
- Bernard Malamud – The Assistant
- Richard Mason – The World of Suzie Wong
- James A. Michener – Rascals in Paradise
- Gladys Mitchell – The Twenty-Third Man
- Nancy Mitford – Voltaire in Love
- C. L. Moore – Doomsday Morning
- Elsa Morante – L'isola di Arturo
- Sławomir Mrożek – Słoń (The Elephant, short stories)
- Iris Murdoch – The Sandcastle
- Vladimir Nabokov – Pnin
- Björn Nyberg and L. Sprague de Camp – The Return of Conan
- Marcel Pagnol – Le Château de ma mère
- Boris Pasternak – Doctor Zhivago
- Anthony Powell – At Lady Molly's
- Maurice Procter – The Midnight Plumber
- Qu Bo (曲波) – Tracks in the Snowy Forest (林海雪原)
- Ayn Rand – Atlas Shrugged
- Robert Randall (pseudonym of Robert Silverberg and Randall Garrett) – The Shrouded Planet
- Alain Robbe-Grillet – La Jalousie
- Douglas Rutherford – The Long Echo
- Nevil Shute – On the Beach
- Robert Paul Smith – Where Did You Go? Out. What Did You Do? Nothing
- Muriel Spark – The Comforters
- Howard Spring – Time and the Hour
- John Steinbeck – The Short Reign of Pippin IV
- Rex Stout
  - Three for the Chair
  - If Death Ever Slept
- Julian Symons – The Colour of Murder
- Elizabeth Taylor – Angel
- Kay Thompson – Eloise in Paris
- Roger Vailland – La Loi
- Jack Vance – Big Planet
- Arved Viirlaid – Seitse kohtupäeva (Seven Days of Trial)
- Henry Wade – The Litmore Snatch
- Evelyn Waugh – The Ordeal of Gilbert Pinfold
- Patrick White – Voss
- Angus Wilson – A Bit Off the Map
- John Wyndham – The Midwich Cuckoos
- Ivan Yefremov – Andromeda Nebula
- Frank Yerby – Fairoaks

=== Children and young people ===
- Mabel Esther Allan – Ballet for Drina
- Gillian Avery – The Warden's Niece
- Rev. W. Awdry – The Eight Famous Engines (twelfth in The Railway Series of 42 books by him and his son Christopher Awdry)
- Narain Dixit – Khar Khar Mahadev (serialized)
- Aileen Fisher – A Lantern in the Window
- Edward Gorey – The Doubtful Guest
- Éva Janikovszky – Csip-csup (Piffling)
- Tove Jansson – Moominland Midwinter (Trollvinter)
- Harold Keith – Rifles for Watie
- Elinor Lyon – Daughters of Aradale
- William Mayne – A Grass Rope
- Otfried Preußler – Die kleine Hexe (The Little Witch)
- Dr. Seuss
  - The Cat in the Hat
  - How the Grinch Stole Christmas!
- Pat Smythe – Jacqueline Rides for a Fall (first of the Three Jays series of seven books)
- Elizabeth George Speare – Calico Captive
- Tomi Ungerer – The Mellops Go Flying
- Dare Wright – The Lonely Doll

=== Drama ===
- Samuel Beckett – Endgame and Act Without Words I (first performed); All That Fall and From an Abandoned Work (first broadcast of both)
- Dorothy and Michael Blankfort – Monique
- Emilio Carballido – El censo
- William Douglas Home – The Iron Duchess
- Christopher Fry – The Dark is Light Enough
- Jean Genet – The Balcony (Le Balcon)
- Günter Grass – Flood (Hochwasser)
- Graham Greene – The Potting Shed
- Michael Clayton Hutton – Silver Wedding
- William Inge – The Dark at the Top of the Stairs
- Errol John – Moon on a Rainbow Shawl
- Bernard Kops – The Hamlet of Stepney Green
- John Osborne
  - The Entertainer
  - Epitaph for George Dillon
- Harold Pinter – The Dumb Waiter (written)
- N. F. Simpson – A Resounding Tinkle
- Wole Soyinka – The Invention
- Boris Vian – Les Bâtisseurs d'Empire (The Empire Builders)
- Tennessee Williams
  - Baby Doll
  - Orpheus Descending

=== Poetry ===
- Robert E. Howard – Always Comes Evening
- Ted Hughes – The Hawk in the Rain
- Pier Paolo Pasolini – Le ceneri di Gramsci
- Octavio Paz – Piedra de Sol
- Jibanananda Das – Rupasi Bangla
- Robert Penn Warren – Promises: Poems, 1954–1956. Won National Book Award for Poetry – Won 1958 Pulitzer Prize for Poetry

=== Non-fiction ===
- Abdelmajid Benjelloun – Fī l-Ṭufūla
- B. R. Ambedkar (died 1956) – The Buddha and His Dhamma
- G. E. M. Anscombe – Intention
- Catherine Drinker Bowen – The Lion and the Throne: The Life and Times of Sir Edward Coke (1552–1634). Wins 1958 National Book Award for Nonfiction
- Gerald Brenan – South from Granada: Seven Years in an Andalusian Village
- M. Đilas – The New Class
- Will Durant – The Reformation. Nominated for National Book Award for Nonfiction
- Elisabeth Elliot – Through Gates of Splendor
- Charles Evans – Kangchenjunga: The Untrodden Peak
- Douglas Southall Freeman – George Washington: A Biography. Wins 1958 Pulitzer Prize for Biography; nominated for National Book Award for Nonfiction
- Northrop Frye – Anatomy of Criticism: Four Essays
- Patience Gray and Primrose Boyd – Plats du jour, illustrated by David Gentleman
- Louis M. Hacker – Alexander Hamilton in the American. Nominated for National Book Award for Nonfiction
- Bray Hammond – Banks and Politics in America. Won 1958 Pulitzer Prize for History
- Gilbert Highet – Poets in a Landscape. Nominated for 1958 National Book Award for Nonfiction
- Richard Hoggart – The Uses of Literacy
- Eric John Holmyard – Alchemy
- Stuart Holroyd – Emergence from Chaos
- Ernst Kantorowicz – The King's Two Bodies
- Henry Kissinger – Nuclear Weapons and Foreign Policy. Nominated for National Book Award for Nonfiction
- Primo Levi – If This Is a Man (Se Questo è un Uomo)
- Art Linkletter – Kids Say the Darndest Things
- Christopher Lloyd – The Mixed Border
- Mary McCarthy – Memories of a Catholic Girlhood. Nominated for National Book Award for Nonfiction
- Tom Maschler (ed.) – Declaration (anthology)
- Eliot Ness and Oscar Fraley – The Untouchables
- Iris Origo – The Merchant of Prato (life and commercial career of Francesco di Marco Datini)
- Walt Whitman Rostow & Max F. Milliken – A Proposal: Key to an Effective Foreign Policy. Nominated for National Book Award for Nonfiction
- Jean-Paul Sartre – Search for a Method (Questions de méthode)
- David Schoenbrun – As France Goes. Nominated for National Book Award for Nonfiction
- Rodolfo Walsh – Operación Masacre
- Ian Watt – The Rise of the Novel: Studies in Defoe, Richardson and Fielding
- Alan Watts – The Way of Zen
- K. A. Wittfogel – Oriental Despotism

== Births ==
- January 7 – Nicholson Baker, American novelist
- January 16 – Stella Tillyard, English writer and historian
- January 22 – Francis Wheen, English journalist and author
- January 27 – Frank Miller, American comic-book cartoonist and scriptwriter
- February 11 – Mitchell Symons, English writer and journalist
- February 15 – Shahriar Mandanipour, Iranian writer
- March 3 – Nicholas Shakespeare, English novelist and biographer
- March 7 – Robert Harris, English novelist and current-affairs writer
- March 20 – John Grogan, American journalist and non-fiction writer
- March 23 – Ananda Devi, Mauritian francophone fiction writer and poet
- March 26 – Paul Morley, English music journalist
- March 29 – Elizabeth Hand, American science fiction and fantasy writer
- April 3
  - Rainer Karlsch, German historian
  - Unni Lindell, Norwegian novelist
- May 13 – Koji Suzuki, Japanese author and screenwriter
- May 17 – Peter Høeg, Danish novelist
- May 23 – Craig Brown, English satirist
- June 8 – Scott Adams, American satirist (died 2026)
- July 12 – Pino Quartullo, Italian actor, director, screenwriter and playwright
- July 14 – Andrew Nicholls, English-born Canadian screenwriter
- July 29 – Liam Davison, Australian novelist (died 2014 in air crash)
- August 23 – Melanie Rae Thon, American fiction writer
- August 24 – Stephen Fry, English comedy performer, broadcast presenter and writer
- August 25 – Simon McBurney, British actor, writer and theatre director
- September 11 – James McBride, American writer and musician
- September 22 – Nick Cave, Australian author and musician
- October 9 – Herman Brusselmans, Belgian novelist, poet, playwright and columnist
- October 28 – Catherine Fisher, British poet and children's writer
- December 3 – Anne B. Ragde, Norwegian novelist
- December 11 – William Joyce, American children's author
- December 12 – Robert Lepage, Canadian playwright
- unknown dates
  - Peter Armstrong, English poet and psychotherapist
  - John Doyle, Irish-born Canadian critic
  - Ana Santos Aramburo, Spanish national librarian

== Deaths ==
- January 10 – Gabriela Mistral, Chilean poet (born 1889)
- January 13 – A. E. Coppard, English short story writer and poet (born 1878)
- January 19 – Barbu Lăzăreanu, Romanian literary historian, poet, and communist journalist (heart attack, born 1881)
- February 10 – Laura Ingalls Wilder, American author (born 1867)
- March 7 – Wyndham Lewis, British novelist (born 1882)
- March 9 – Rhoda Power, English children's writer and broadcaster (born 1890)
- March 12 – John Middleton Murry, English critic (born 1889)
- March 28 – Christopher Morley, American journalist, novelist and poet (born 1890)
- March 29 – Joyce Cary, Irish novelist (born 1888)
- April 22 – Roy Campbell, South African poet and satirist (born 1901)
- June 17
  - May Edginton, English popular novelist (born 1883)
  - Dorothy Richardson, English novelist and journalist (born 1873)
- June 26
  - Alfred Döblin, German novelist (born 1878)
  - Malcolm Lowry, English novelist and poet (born 1909)
- July 10
  - Sholem Asch, Polish-Jewish novelist, dramatist and essayist (born 1880)
  - Julia Boynton Green, American author and poet (born 1861)
- July 19 – Curzio Malaparte, Italian novelist, playwright, and journalist (cancer, born 1898)
- July 21 – Kenneth Roberts, American historical novelist (born 1885)
- July 23 – Giuseppe Tomasi di Lampedusa, Italian novelist (born 1896)
- July 24 – Sacha Guitry, Russian-born French playwright, actor and director (b. 1885)
- August 1 – Rose Fyleman, English writer and poet (born 1877)
- August 21 – Mait Metsanurk, Estonian writer (born 1879)
- August 25 – Leo Perutz, Austrian-born novelist and mathematician (born 1882)
- September 2 – William Craigie, Scottish lexicographer (born 1867)
- September 12 – José Lins do Rego, Brazilian novelist (born 1901)
- September 22 – Oliver St. John Gogarty, Irish poet and memoirist (born 1878)
- October 25 – Edward Plunkett, Baron Dunsany, Irish author (born 1878)
- October 26 – Nikos Kazantzakis, Greek novelist (born 1883)
- November 8 – Ernest Elmore (John Bude), English crime writer and theatre director (born 1901)
- November 24 – Alfred Eckhard Zimmern, English historian and political scientist (born 1879)
- December 15 – Mulshankar Mulani, Gujarati playwright (born 1867)
- December 17 – Dorothy L. Sayers, English crime novelist (born 1893)
- December 24 – Arturo Barea, Spanish journalist, broadcaster and writer (born 1897)
- December 25 – Stanley Vestal, American writer, poet and historian (born 1877)

== Awards ==
- Carnegie Medal for children's literature: William Mayne, A Grass Rope
- Friedenspreis des Deutschen Buchhandels: Thornton Wilder
- James Tait Black Memorial Prize for fiction: Anthony Powell, At Lady Molly's
- James Tait Black Memorial Prize for biography: Maurice Cranston, Life of John Locke
- Miles Franklin Award: Patrick White, Voss
- Newbery Medal for children's literature: Virginia Sorenson, Miracles on Maple Hill
- Nobel Prize for Literature: Albert Camus
- Premio Nadal: Carmen Martín Gaite, Entre visillos
- Prix Goncourt: Roger Vailland, La Loi
- Pulitzer Prize for Drama: Eugene O'Neill, Long Day's Journey into Night
- Pulitzer Prize for Fiction: no award given
- Pulitzer Prize for Poetry: Richard Wilbur: Things of This World
- Queen's Gold Medal for Poetry: Siegfried Sassoon

== Notes ==
- Hahn, Daniel (2015). The Oxford Companion to Children's Literature (2nd ed.). Oxford. University Press. ISBN 9780198715542.
