= Yves Courrière =

French writer, biographer and journalist

- Born: Gérard Bon; 12 October 1935; 12th arrondissement of Paris
- Died: 8 May 2012 (aged 76); Paris
- Occupations: Journalist; Writer; Biographer

Yves Courrière, real name Gérard Bon (12 October 1935 – 8 May 2012) was a French writer, biographer and journalist.

== Biography ==
As a child Courrière read Albert Londres, Oscar Wilde and became passionate about adventure stories. As a journalist, in 1957 he joined the editorial staff of Radio-Luxembourg and participated in Armand Jammot's 10 Millions d'auditeurs, first radio magazine of the post-war period.

He was then sent to report in 1958 to follow the voyages of General de Gaulle to Africa, and went to countries affected by armed conflicts, civil wars or revolutions, notably in India, the Middle East, and Algeria. He covered the Algerian war and obtained the Albert Londres Prize in 1966 for his articles on Latin America.

From these events, Courrière derived a monumental work that is still being referred to, a landmark in its proximity to the end of the conflict as well as the quality of the sources he obtained. On its release, La Guerre d'Algérie was rewarded by the Prix de l'Académie française and was published to more than one million copies.

Courrière covered the Eichmann's trial in 1961, the inaugural crossing of the France in 1962, imposing himself as one of the great signatures of journalism. In 1967, he led the first edition of Les Dossiers de l'écran on the second channel of the ORTF, a program that will host other presenters during its 24 years of broadcasting. He decided from 1968 to stop his activity as reporter to dedicate himself to a career of writer. In particular, he published novels and biographies of emblematic personalities from the first half of the twentieth century such as Joseph Kessel, Jacques Prévert, Roger Vailland or Pierre Lazareff.

In September 1971, he created the weekly magazine Historia Magazine - La Guerre d'Algérie of which he took the direction, the magazine was published by Éditions Tallandier, the last issue was published in January 1974.

In 1972, along director Philippe Monnier, he realized the first documentary devoted to the war in Algeria. This film is considered the reference on this conflict.

== Meeting with Roger Vailland ==
Courrière met Roger Vailland the day on which the latter received the Prix Goncourt for his novel The Law in December 1957. Roger Vailland was still under the spell of the break with "his communist season" where he felt "like dead" he wrote in his Écrits intimes. To get him out of the depression into which he was falling, his wife Elisabeth took him to his country, Italy, in the Apulia, that hard region, with the crystallized relations he describes so well in his novel.

In the spring of 1961, they met in Jerusalem to cover the Eichmann's trial. There, Vailland introduced him to his friend Joseph Kessel whom he had known before the war at Paris-Soir. He planned to write a documented biography devoted to Roger Vailland in 1991.

== Works ==
- La Guerre d'Algérie (4 volumes published by Fayard and reissued in two volumes in 2001: La guerre d'Algérie 1957–1962, ISBN 978-2213611181 and La guerre d'Algérie 1954-1957)
  - 1968: Les Fils de la Toussaint
  - 1969: Le Temps des léopards
  - 1970: L'Heure des colonels
  - 1971: Les Feux du désespoir
- 1971–1974 Historia Magazine - La Guerre d'Algérie , Éditions Tallandier, (112 issues)
- 1974: Le Roman des hauts de Saint-Jean, Fayard
- 1974: L'Homme qui court, Fayard
- 1979: Normandie Niemen, Presses de la Cité, ISBN 978-2258005907
- 1985: Joseph Kessel ou Sur la piste du lion, Plon ISBN 978-2259012997
- 1987: Les Excès de la passion, Plon
- 1987: Le Démon de l'aventure, Plon
- 1991: Roger Vailland, ou un libertin au regard froid, Plon
- 1995: Pierre Lazareff ou le vagabond de l'actualité, Éditions Gallimard,ISBN 978-2070730308
- 1999: Les Aubarèdes, roman, Presses de la Cité, ISBN 978-2258044708
- 2000: Jacques Prévert. En vérité, Gallimard, ISBN 978-2070740550
- 2003: Éclats de vie, mémoires, éditions Fayard, ISBN 978-2213615387
