= François Bott =

French journalist (1935–2022)

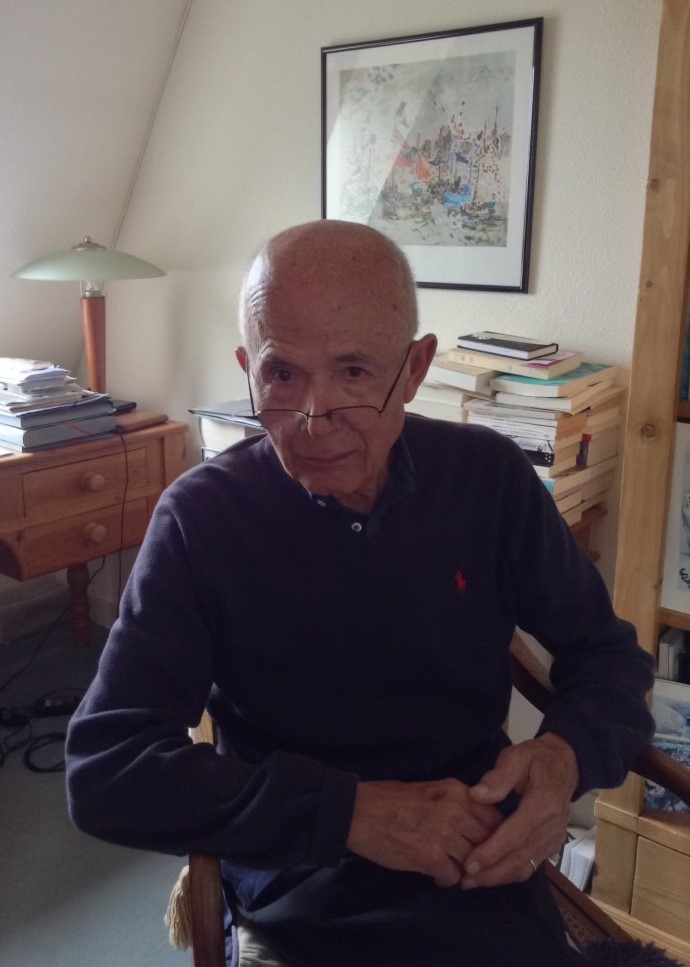
- Born: 26 June 1935; Laon, France
- Died: 22 September 2022 (aged 87); Paris, France
- Occupations: Writer; Journalist

François Bott (26 June 1935 – 22 September 2022) was a French author who after a long career as a journalist and literary critic became a writer of novels, one of which, Une minute d’absence (2001), won the Académie Française's Prix de la Nouvelle. He continued as a literary critic, writing essays focused on other writers, especially Roger Vailland.

== Biography ==
After earning his Licence in philosophy, Bott began as a journalist at France-Soir. He then directed the literary pages of L'Express and founded Le Magazine Littéraire in 1967. The following year he joined the newspaper Le Monde, where he directed Le Monde des livres from 1983 to 1991, replacing Jacqueline Piatier. In 1995, he decided to leave journalism to devote himself to writing books.

Bott authored some thirty books, including novels and literary essays, such as La Demoiselle des Lumières and Sur la planète des sentiments, works on writers and exceptional women. His Vel'd'Hiv' retells the story of the Vélodrome d'hiver, from a cycling track to a place of repression and torture during World War II. Bott was awarded the Académie Française's Prix de la Nouvelle in 2001 for Une minute d’absence.

Bott's last novel, Nos années éperdues (2015), was praised in the magazine Causeur for its portrayal of life in France in the 1950s, and particularly for the rendering of the correspondence between the two main characters.

A member of the jury of the Roger Vailland prize, Bott has regularly participated in events on the work of the writer, including a lecture on Roger Vailland et 325.000 francs, public reading of Drôle de jeu, at La Table ronde publishing house entitled l'esprit de conquête (Vailland's work: Cortès, le conquérant de l'Eldorado). In particular, he published a reference book on Vailland: Les Saisons de Roger Vailland.

Bott was a regular contributor to the literary magazine Service littéraire. He died in Paris at the age of 87 on 22 September 2022.

== Main works ==
=== Novels and essays ===
The books by Bott are held by the French National Library:

- 1969: Les Saisons de Roger Vailland, éditions Grasset
- 1986: Lettres à Baudelaire, Chandler et quelques autres, éditions Albin Michel, 146 pages ISBN 2-226-02631-2
- 1998: Sur la planète des sentiments, portraits littéraires d'Emmanuel Berl à Stefan Zweig, Collection Amor Fati, Cherche Midi, ISBN 978-2-86274-557-2
- 2002: Dieu prenait-il du café ?, portraits littéraires du XIX, Collection Amor Fati, Cherche Midi ISBN 978-2-86274-973-0
- 2007: Femmes de plaisirs, Cherche Midi ISBN 978-2-7491-0689-2
- 2003: Femmes extrêmes, Cherche Midi ISBN 978-2-7491-0110-1,
- 2005: Faut-il rentrer de Montevideo ?, sur les traces de Lautréamont, collection Romans, août 2005, Éditions du Cherche Midi, ISBN 978-2-7491-0425-6
- 2008: Vel'd'Hiv', Édition du Cherche Midi, 2008, ISBN 978-2-7491-0912-1
- 2003: Radiguet : L'Enfant avec une canne, Éditions Gallimard, collection Folio, 220 pages, ISBN 2070301257
- 1997: La Demoiselle des lumières, Éditeur Gallimard, collection Un et l'Autre, ISBN 207074342X
- 1996: Le Cousin de la marquise, Éditeur Le Monde Éditions, collection Monde Éditions, ISBN 2878991303
- 1988: Éloge de l'égotisme, Éditeur Éditions de l'Instant, collection : Griffures, ISBN 2869290837
- 2001: Une minute d'absence, Éditeur Gallimard, Collection Blanche, 131 pages, ISBN 207075927X
- 2006: Le Genre féminin, Éditions des Équateurs
- 2004: L'Éclat de rire de la jeunesse
- 2008! Gina, Éditions de La Table Ronde, collection La petite Vermillon, 193 pages, ISBN 2710330504
- 2010: Écrivains en robe de chambre, Éditions de La Table Ronde, collection La petite Vermillon, 280 pages, ISBN 9782710331575
- 2010: La Traversée des jours : Souvenirs de la République des Lettres (1958-2008), Éditions du Cherche Midi, 169 pages. ISBN 9782749113678
- 2014: Le Dernier Tango de Kees Van Dongen, Éditions du Cherche Midi, 144 pages ISBN 9782749130026

=== Works written in collaboration ===
- Boulevard de l'océan par François de Cornière, preface by François Bott, Édition Le Castor Astral, collection Poche, May 2006
- Enquête poésie auprès de 250 revues littéraires, Édition Jean-Michel Place, collection Enquête, par Jean-Michel Place, François Bott, Jacques Lepage, et Michel Carassou, 1979
- Le Discours du chameau, suivi de Jenine et autres poèmes par Tahar Ben Jelloun et François Bott, Éditions Gallimard Poche, collection Poésie, March 2007, 543 pages, ISBN 2070342379
- Les Séductions de l'existence, François Bott, Dominique Grisoni, Yves Simon, Roland Jaccard, LGF/Livre de poche, collection Biblio Essais, December 1989
