= Earthfasts =

Earthfasts may refer to:

- Earthfast is old English for post in ground construction, for example prehistoric megalithic monuments that were built for some long-lost religious purpose. Most are in desolate places. They are earthfast, that is, they are visible on the surface, but are fast in the earth.
- Earthfasts trilogy by William Mayne, comprising Earthfasts, Cradlefasts and Candlefasts, an unusual evocation of the King Arthur legend.

- Earthfasts (TV series), a 1994 BBC children's drama based on the book by William Mayne
