= Sophomoric humor =

Silly, immature, or childish humor

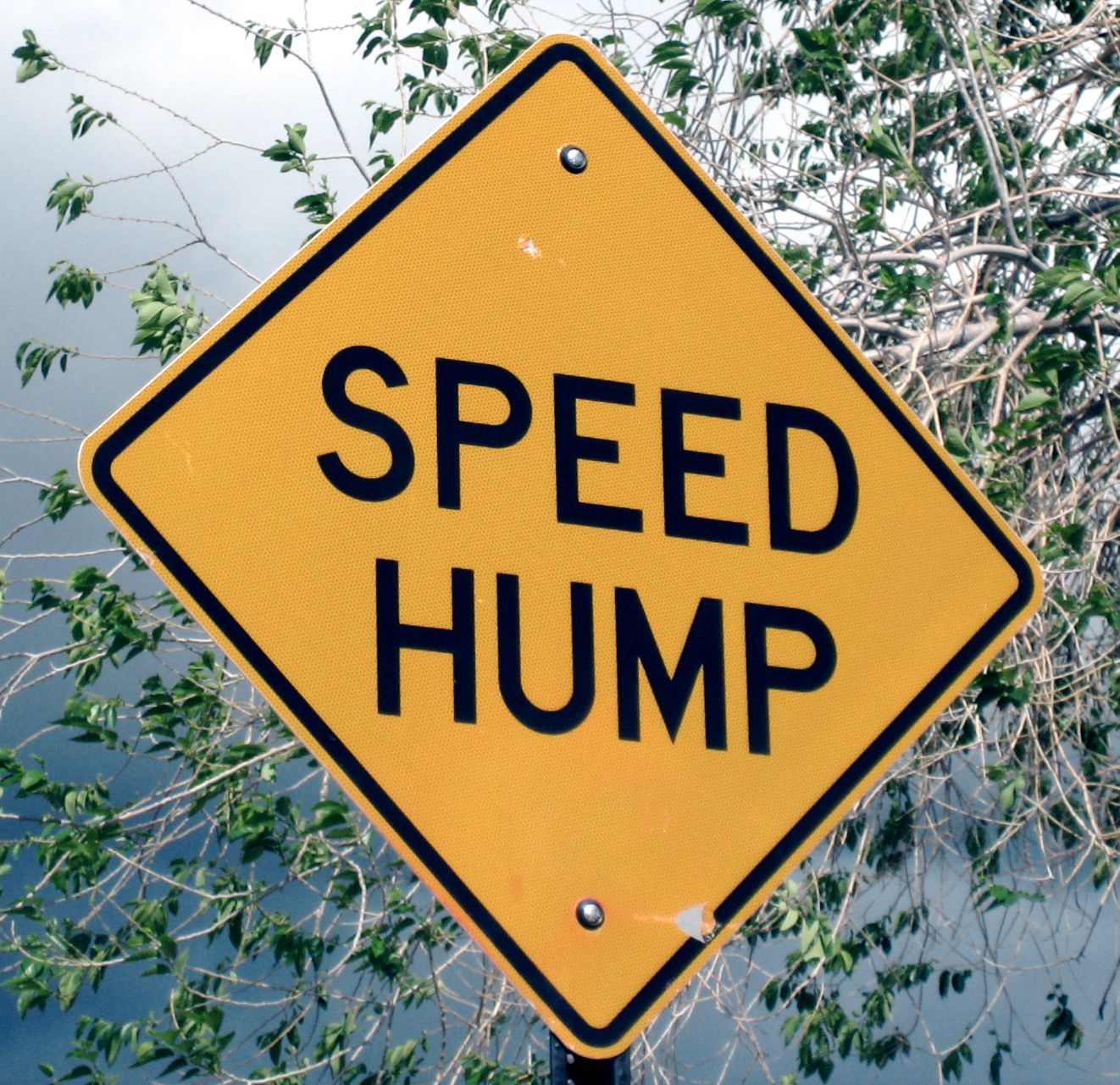
Taking unintended meaning from a street sign that seems to encourage humping can provide an amusing game of word association, via homonyms, for those with a sophomoric sense of humor.

Sophomoric humor (also called juvenile humor or schoolboy humor) is any type of humor that is considered silly, immature, or childish. The phrase can be derisive, but is also used to refer to a style or type of comedic act.

It is a type of comedy that often includes toilet humor.

== Examples ==
A critique of John Steinbeck's The Short Reign of Pippin IV by Peter Lisca describes the story as lacking the burlesque humor of Tortilla Flat, the Rabelaisian humor of "St. Katy the Virgin," the folk humor of The Grapes of Wrath, the tender humor of Cannery Row, the "terrible" Swiftian humor of The Wayward Bus, and (instead) consisting of "a sophomoric humor of grotesque improbability and wordplay."

British comic Viz has been described as schoolboy humor.

American film director Judd Apatow's work, including The 40 Year Old Virgin, Knocked Up and Funny People, has been described as using sophomoric humor, drawing laughs for jokes about sex, penises, and bodily functions.
