= The Divine and the Decay =

1957 novel by Bill Hopkins

- First edition
- Author: Bill Hopkins
- Language: English
- Publisher: MacGibbon & Kee
- Publication date: 1957
- Publication place: United Kingdom
- Pages: 234

The Divine and the Decay is a 1957 novel by the Welsh writer Bill Hopkins. It was republished as The Leap, in 1984. It tells the story of the leader of a British right-wing populist party who has decided to have his internal rival assassinated. To provide an alibi for himself he stays on a small Channel Island, where he becomes fascinated by a very self-possessed young woman. It was Hopkins' first and only published novel.

== Plot ==
In a review of the novel for The Spectator, Simon Raven summarizes it as follows:

Peter Plowart, a fanatical and important member of a quasi-Fascist political party, takes a holiday in a remote Channel Island, ostensibly for a rest, but actually so that his minions can kill his rival and party boss in London with a hatchet and without involving Plowart. … But Plowart meets more than he bargains for on the island. The crude, shrewd fisherfolk soon get his number, and so does the young Dame of the island — a tiresome, intuitive creature who befriends Plowart, is raped in return, and finally tries to destroy him, not out of resentment at being raped, but because she thinks it in everyone’s best interest.

== Conception ==
According to Bill Hopkins' friend Colin Wilson, the book had its background in the nightly conversations the two had in Paris in 1953. Both Hopkins and Wilson admired a set of authors active around year 1900—George Bernard Shaw, H. G. Wells, G. K. Chesterton and Anatole France—and preferred these to the generations which had followed. Wilson attributed this to the atmosphere of defeat in the works of later generations; he exemplified this with the treatment of Friedrich Nietzsche in Bertrand Russell's influential A History of Western Philosophy, where Nietzsche's use of the word "will" is reduced to being associated with Nazi Germany. According to Wilson, both he and Hopkins found "will" to be "the only valid starting point for philosophy", and they both found Nietzsche's phrase about "how one becomes what one is" to be of central value.

The fictional island of Vachau is based on Sark. Hopkins visited Sark in 1956 to do research for the novel.

== Publication ==
The book was accepted by MacGibbon & Kee at the height of the angry young men movement, which Hopkins was associated with, and published in 1957. It was republished as The Leap by Deverell & Birdsey in 1984.

== Reception and legacy ==
The book was heavily attacked by critics upon the publication. Graham Hough of Encounter, a cultural magazine covertly funded by the CIA, called it "an adolescent power-fantasy, extremely shoddily written", and wrote:

What is surprising, after the history of the last thirty years, is that even the naivest masturbations of the most unhappy young man should be able to take this openly Fascist form. The fact that this performance has been treated in some quarters with a moderate respect shows that there is a dangerous vacuum in our present culture that could easily be filled with highly unpleasant material; though not, I should have thought, with anything as poisonously silly as this.

According to Wilson, Hopkins remained self-confident on the surface despite the book's reception, but was shaken by what Wilson described as "character assassination", as opposed to normal literary controversy. When the typescript for Hopkins' second novel, Time and Totality, was accidentally destroyed by fire, Hopkins did not bother to rewrite it.
