= Young Shoulders =

1982 novel by John Wain

- First edition (publ. Macmillan)
- Author: John Wain
- Language: English
- Publication date: 1982

Young Shoulders is a 1982 novel by John Wain. It portrays incompatibility in a marital relationship and how such a flawed marriage affects the children born out of it. It won the 1982 Whitbread Prize.
