= Ilona Sekacz =

British composer

Ilona Sekacz (born 6 April 1948) is a British composer of concert, film, television and theatre music.

== Early life ==
Sekacz was born in Blackpool, Lancashire to a Polish father and an English mother. She studied violin and was a member of the National Youth Orchestra of Great Britain. She lived on St Martin's Road, her parents had a hotel

Later she enrolled at the University of Birmingham, initially studying music but then changing to drama and theatre. She never completed her joint degree. (Fuller 2006).

== Career ==
She worked for the British Film Institute for four years, then attended a performance of Jesus Christ Superstar, and realised that she could possibly do better, or at least no worse, so immediately left the BFI and took up composing.

Sekacz began her career making music for the theatre, spending three years with the Unicorn Theatre in London, for whom she composed musique concrète scores. She then worked for the Shared Experience company, and in 1982 composed music for the Royal Shakespeare Company's production of King Lear. Subsequently, she worked extensively with that company as a freelance composer, writing music for plays by Shakespeare as well as by other authors (Fuller 2006). She scored a number of television projects in the 1980s, including Alan Bleasdale's Boys from the Blackstuff (1982), and the 1992 series of Maigret (Fuller 2006).

In 1989, she composed an opera, A Small Green Space, to a libretto by Fay Weldon. Employing a mixture of amateur and professional performers, this opera was taken on tour throughout England by the English National Opera (Fuller 2006). Her instrumental works include orchestral and chamber music, as well as choral music composed mainly in aid of conservation and wildlife causes (Fuller 2006).

In 1992, the Warwick Arts Society, with funding from West Midlands Arts, commissioned Lost in the Gallery for the Warwick Festival. It was premiered at the Ilmington Church on 27 June 1992 and then performed twice in the Bohemian Festival before being presented at the Warwick Festival itself (Phillips 1992).

In 2010, she wrote the music for the play Onassis portraying the life of the Greek shipping magnate Aristotle Onassis.

== Filmography ==
- Dalziel and Pascoe (television series): "Fallen Angel" (2006)
- Le Cadeau d’Elena (2004)
- Wondrous Oblivion (2003)
- Bertie and Elizabeth (2002)
- Dalziel and Pascoe (television series): "For Love Nor Money" (2002)
- Dalziel and Pascoe: "Secrets of the Dead" (2001)
- Station Jim (2000)
- It Can Be Done (1999)
- Solomon and Gaenor (1999)
- A Certain Justice (1998)
- Mortimer's Law (1998)
- Mrs. Dalloway (1997)
- Under the Skin (1997)
- Wokenwell (TV series, 1997)
- My Night with Reg (TV film, 1996)
- Antonia's Line (1995)
- Henry IV (TV play, 1995)
- Earthfasts (1994)
- A Pin for the Butterfly (1994)
- Love On a Branch Line (TV miniseries, 1993)
- Fighting for Gemma (1993)
- Common Pursuit (1992)
- The Countess Alice (1992)
- Back Home (TV film, 1990)
- Can You Hear Me Thinking? (TV film, 1990)
- The Lilac Bus (TV film, 1990)
- The Heat of the Day (TV film, 1989)
- Knuckle (TV film, 1989)
- Dead Lucky (TV film, 1988)
- Intimate Contact (TV film, 1987)
- Imaginary Friends (TV miniseries, 1987)
- Final Run (TV film, 1987)
- Northanger Abbey (TV film, 1987)
- The Importance of Being Earnest (TV film, 1986)
- Fox Tales (TV series, 1985)
- Dutch Girls (TV film, 1985)
- Freud (6-part TV miniseries, 1984)
- Across the Water (TV film, 1983)
- Boys from the Blackstuff (TV miniseries, 1982)
- Not for the Likes of Us (TV play, 1980)
- Buses (TV play, 1980)
