= Philip Callow =

English novelist

Philip Kenneth Callow (26 October 1924 – 22 September 2007) was an English novelist known for his autobiographical portrayals of working-class life. During a long career as a writer, he published 16 novels, poetry, and several biographies of artists and authors, including Vincent van Gogh, D. H. Lawrence, Anton Chekhov, Walt Whitman, and Paul Cézanne.

== Life ==
Callow was born into a working-class family in Stechford, near Birmingham. In 1930, his family moved to Coventry, where he spent the rest of his childhood. He attended Coventry Technical College, and at the age of 15 was apprenticed as a toolmaker at the Coventry Gauge and Tool Company. In 1948, he became a clerk at the ministries of war and supplies, where he worked for three years. He later moved to Plymouth and became a clerk at the South West Electricity Board.

His first novel, The Hosanna Man, appeared in 1956, but was withdrawn by the publisher over a threatened libel suit. According to a present-day commentator, "The flair he would display as both a novelist and biographer is very much in evidence." Though he continued writing novels, he returned to school in the 1960s, attending Exmouth College of Education, where he trained as a teacher. In the 1970s and 1980s, he taught creative writing at various universities, and turned to writing biographies, starting with Son and Lover, a biography of D. H. Lawrence published in 1975. From 1980 to 1986, he was appointed writer-in-residence at Sheffield Polytechnic.

Callow was married to Irene Christian Vallance (1952–1973), Penelope Jane Newman (1974–1987), and Anne Jennifer Golby (1987–2007). He had one daughter from his first marriage, Fleur Alyse Harvey.

== Work ==
=== Early novels ===
Callow's first novel, The Hosanna Man (1956), is a portrayal of a Midlands artist inspired by Callow's own life. The main character, Louis, moves from Coventry to Nottingham to pursue both a career as an artist and an affair with a married woman, Stella. Louis meets a cast of bohemians and other artists as he attempts to develop his skills in painting watercolors and writing poetry. Though the novel was met with some positive reviews, it was withdrawn by the publisher after a Nottingham bookseller claimed to recognize himself in one of the characters. The bookseller threatened to sue for libel, and the publisher, fearing a lawsuit, pulped the remaining copies.

In his second novel, Common People (1958), Callow continued his autobiographical exploration of the life of Midlands artists. The novel's protagonist, Nick Chapman, is torn between his dream of pursuing a career as an artist in London and his desire to settle down and "know common joys" in his home town of Woodfield. Common People was chosen as one of the Sunday Times best books of the year by John Betjeman, who said that Callow's writing "sounds like a genuine cry from a class usually silent in the literary world."

In subsequent novels, including Native Ground (1959), A Pledge for the Earth (1960), and Clipped Wings (1963), Callow experimented with non-autobiographical subject matter and third-person narration.

=== Another Flesh trilogy ===
Callow's "best-received and appreciated fictional work" was the trilogy Going to the Moon (1968), The Bliss Body (1969), and Flesh of the Morning (1971), later released in an omnibus volume as Another Flesh. Like much of his work, the trilogy is set in the midlands and has autobiographical elements. In his review of The Bliss Body, Robert Baldick praised Callow as "the master of the literary cliffhanger."

=== Biographies ===
At the suggestion of his agent, Callow began writing biographies of authors and artists he admired. He began with Son and Lover (1975), a biography of fellow working-class author D. H. Lawrence, to whom Callow has often been compared. He continued writing biographies until the end of his life, including accounts of Vincent van Gogh, Anton Chekhov, Walt Whitman, Paul Cézanne, and others. His biographies have been both praised and criticized for their "exuberant style" and "conscious rejection of objectivity."

=== Late works ===
Writing autobiographies reinvigorated Callow both creatively and financially, and he returned to fiction with The Painter's Confession (1989), Some Love (1991), and The Magnolia (1994). His last published non-fiction work was Passage From Home, an autobiographical text published in 2002. Callow also wrote poetry sporadically throughout his life, publishing over a dozen such volumes.

== Reception ==
Callow's work was consistently met with praise from critics. Penelope Mortimer of the Sunday Times called Common People "The most brilliantly successful account of English working-class life I have ever encountered in any medium," while Isabel Quigly praised the novel as "alive", calling it "the direct stuff of life, so direct it scarcely has the form of fiction, so present it is painful, so truthful it is cleansing, salutary and exhilarating." V. S. Naipaul called Callow's prose "clear and easy and elegant" and his observations of people and settings "sharp but kind and never superficial." Margaret Drabble also praised Callow's fairness and accuracy: "By some happy balance of insight and sympathy, Philip Callow manages to engage attention and understanding without alienating common sense." J. B. Priestley praised his "admirable and indeed all-too-rare truth, sincerity and sensitiveness" and said that his prose was "[d]one beautifully, with fine economy." Some scholars include Callow as a member of the Angry Young Men, a loosely-affiliated group of post-war working-class authors.

== Bibliography ==
=== Novels ===
- The Hosanna Man, Cape, 1956
- Common People, Heinemann, 1958
- Native Ground, 1959
- A Pledge for the Earth, Heinemann, 1960
- Clipped Wings, Times Press, 1963
- Going to the Moon, MacGibbon and Kee, 1968
- The Bliss Body, MacGibbon and Kee, 1969
- Flesh of Morning, Bodley Head, 1971
- Yours, Bodley Head, 1972
- The Story of My Desire, Bodley Head, 1976
- Janine, Bodley Head, 1977
- The Subway to New York, Martin Brian and O'Keeffe, 1979
- Another Flesh, Omnibus edition of Going to the Moon, The Bliss Body and Flesh of the Morning, Allison and Busby, 1989
- The Painter's Confessions, Allison and Busby, 1989
- Some Love, Allison and Busby, 1991
- The Magnolia, Allison and Busby, 1994

=== Biographies ===
- Son and Lover: The Young D.H. Lawrence, 1975
- Van Gogh: A Life 1990
- From Noon to Starry Night: A Life of Walt Whitman, 1992
- Lost Earth: A Life of Cezanne, 1995
- Chekhov: The Hidden Ground: A Biography, 1998
- Louis: A Life of Robert Louis Stevenson, 2001
- Body of Truth: D. H. Lawrence, the Nomadic Years, 2003

=== Poetry ===
- Turning Point, London, Heinemann, 1964
- The Real Life: New Poems, Times Press, 1964
- Bare Wires, Chatto and Windus-Hogarth Press, 1972
- Cave Light, Rivelin Press, 1981
- New York Insomnia and Other Poems, RivelinGrapheme Press, 1984
- Icons, Bradford, Blue Bridge Press, 1987
- Soliloquies of an Eye, Littlewood Press, 1990
- Notes over a Chasm, Redbeck Press, 1991
- Fires in October, Redbeck Press, 1994

=== Autobiographies ===
- In My Own Land, photographs by James Bridgen, 1965
- Passage From Home, 2002

=== Short stories ===
- "Native Ground," Heinemann, 1959
- "Woman with a Poet," Rivelin Press, 1983
- "Merry Christmas," in New Statesman (London), 22 December 1961

=== Stage play ===
- The Honeymooners (televised 1960), published in New Granada Plays, Faber, 1961

=== Radio plays ===
- The Lamb, 1971
- On Some Road, 1979

=== Television play ===
- The Honeymooners, 1960

== See also ==
- Proletarian literature
