= Emergence from Chaos =

Book by Stuart Holroyd

- First edition
- Author: Stuart Holroyd
- Language: English
- Publisher: V. Gollancz
- Publication date: 1957
- Publication place: United Kingdom
- Pages: 222

Emergence from Chaos is a 1957 book by the English writer Stuart Holroyd. In the first part of the book, Holroyd discusses different types of spirituality, while in the second part—roughly two thirds of the book—these distinctions are used to analyse the works of six different poets, each of whom reacted to the issues of modernity with his own spiritual vision. The book was Holroyd's debut and is associated with the phenomenon of the Angry Young Men.

== Contents ==
Part one

- Two kinds of religious experience
- Sinner, saint and mystic
- Art and religion
- The Renaissance of destiny

Part two

- Dylan Thomas and the religion of the instinctive life
- Walt Whitman's healthy-mindedness
- W.B. Yeats: the divided man
- Angel and demon: a study of Arthur Rimbaud
- Rilke: the visionary individualist
- T.S. Eliot and the 'intellectual soul'

== Publication ==
The book was published in 1957 by V. Gollancz, which previously had published Colin Wilson's The Outsider. An American edition appeared the same year through Houghton Mifflin.

== Reception ==
Burns Singer wrote in Encounter: "Repeatedly, whenever I have met him, Mr Stuart Holroyd has struck me as an unusually intelligent, modest, and cultivated young man. His book, unfortunately, displays none of these qualities, unless it be in homeopathic doses." Singer continued: "Mr Holroyd's mind is quite obviously of the kind that can absorb a good deal of experience, that needs years to mature. In this he differs from the figure with whom he will inevitably be compared, Mr Colin Wilson. ... But he does need these years."

William Bittner of the Saturday Review wrote that "Holroyd's discussions of individual poets are fascinating but uneven". Bittner's main objection was to Holroyd's rejection of materialism: "The flaw in Holroyd's thinking lies in his antiquated notion about the mystical artist. All truly great artists are mystics, but mystics with a difference. They seek, not to be unified with deity, but to be unified with the world as it is." Bittner nevertheless described the book as "sensitive and perceptive".
