= Acy-en-Multien =

- Commune
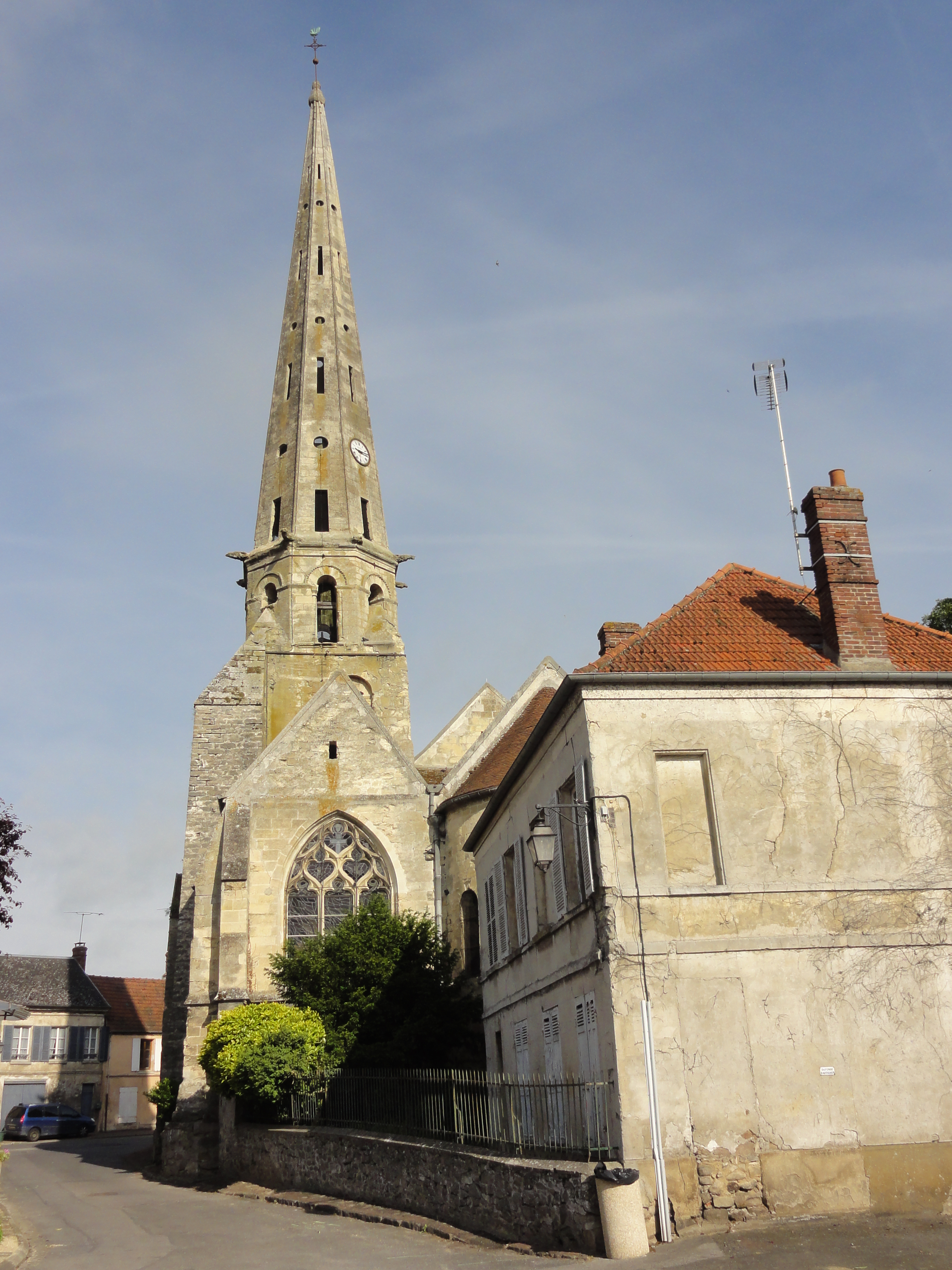
- The church in Acy-en-Multien
- Location of Acy-en-Multien
- Location within France Location within Hauts-de-France
- Coordinates: 49°06′21″N 2°57′19″E
- Country: France
- Region: Hauts-de-France
- Department: Oise
- Arrondissement: Senlis
- Canton: Nanteuil-le-Haudouin
- Intercommunality: Pays de Valois

Government
  - Mayor (2020–2026): Jean-Michel Ramiz
- Area^{1}: 11.47 km^{2} (4.43 sq mi)
- Elevation: 90 m (300 ft)
- Highest elevation: 140 m (460 ft)
- Lowest elevation: 77 m (253 ft)
- Population (2023): 821
  - Density: 71.6/km^{2} (185/sq mi)
- Time zone: UTC+01:00 (CET)
  - Summer (DST): UTC+02:00 (CEST)
- INSEE/Postal code: 60005 /60620
- ^{1} French Land Register data, which excludes lakes, ponds, glaciers > 1 km^{2} (0.386 sq mi or 247 acres) and river estuaries.

Acy-en-Multien (French pronunciation: [asi ɑ̃ myltjɛ̃], lit. 'Acy in Multien') is a commune in the Oise department in northern France.

== Population ==
Historical population
Year	Pop.	±% p.a.
1968	473	—
1975	503	+0.88%
1982	734	+5.55%
1990	766	+0.53%
1999	752	−0.20%
2007	754	+0.03%
2012	815	+1.57%
2017	849	+0.82%
2023	821	−0.56%
Source: INSEE

== See also ==
- Communes of the Oise department
- Claude Gensac
- Roger Vailland
