= Bill Hopkins (novelist) =

Welsh novelist and journalist

- Born: Bill Hopkins; 5 May 1928; Cardiff, Wales
- Died: 6 May 2011 (aged 83)
- Occupation: Writer
- Writing career
- Period: 20th century
- Literary movement: Angry young men

Bill Hopkins (5 May 1928–6 May 2011) was a Welsh novelist and journalist who has been grouped with the angry young men.

== Early life ==
His parents, Edward Lewis "Ted" Hopkins and Violet Brodrick, were stage comedians.

== Work ==
Hopkins's one published novel is a philosophical thriller, The Divine and the Decay (London, MacGibbon and Kee, 1957). The novel "had an antagonistic reception." Graham Hough of Encounter called it "an adolescent power-fantasy, extremely shoddily written" and expressed surprise that "even the naivest masturbations of the most unhappy young man should be able to take this openly Fascist form." In response, the publisher voluntarily recalled and pulped copies of the work. The novel was reprinted in 1984 under the title The Leap, with an introduction by Colin Wilson and a new preface by Hopkins.

Hopkins was also the author of "Ways Without Precedent", an essay included in Declaration, edited by Tom Maschler (London, MacGibbon & Kee, 1957), an anthology of non-fiction pieces by writers identified as Angry Young Men and Women, and "Aiming for a Likeness", his contribution to Colin Wilson: A Celebration (1988), in which he recalls how he arranged a meeting between Wilson and the portrait and fresco painter Pietro Annigoni.

Hopkins has been grouped with the authors Colin Wilson and Stuart Holroyd, with whom he shared a house in London in the late 1950s.

== Later life ==
In the mid-1980s, Hopkins edited and published The Monitor (originally titled The Arab Monitor), employing artist Cliff G. Hanley to design the covers. This was a news magazine focused on the Middle East.

He was survived by his German-born wife, Carla Hopkins, who owns the antiques store they ran together for many years, and one of his sisters, Mary Angela Thomas, living in San Francisco, California, plus a nephew and niece.

== Portrayals ==
Hopkins, and his brief political career as a leader of the Spartacan movement, is lampooned in Bernard Kops's debut novel Awake for Mourning (1968).

== Works ==
=== Novel ===
- The Divine and the Decay. 1st ed. London: MacGibbon and Kee, 1957). 2nd ed. London: Deverell and Birdsey, 1984. 3rd ed. Dunce, 2024.

=== Essays ===
- "Ways without a Precedent," in Declaration, ed. Tom Maschler (London: MacGibbon and Kee, 1957). Reprinted in Counter-Currents (19 March 2015).
- "Aiming for a Likeness" in Colin Wilson, a Celebration: Essays and Recollections, ed. Colin Stanley. London: Cecil Woolf, 1988.

=== Poetry ===
- "Selected Poems" ["Xanadu," "Claudian Landscape," "Heroic Head," "Soft Perceptions," Salute to Henry Moore" and "The Prince of War"], Synthesis (n.d.). Reprinted in Counter-Currents (7 June 2011).
