= John Wain =

English writer (1925–1994)

John Barrington Wain CBE (14 March 1925 – 24 May 1994) was an English poet, novelist, and critic, associated with the literary group known as "The Movement". He worked for most of his life as a freelance journalist and author, writing and reviewing for newspapers and the radio.

== Life and education ==
Wain was born and grew up in Stoke-on-Trent, Staffordshire, the son of a dentist, Arnold Wain, and his wife Annie, née Turner. He had an older sister and a younger brother, Noel. After attending Newcastle-under-Lyme High School, he entered St. John's College, Oxford, gaining a first in his BA in 1946 and an MA in 1950. He was a Fereday Fellow of St John's between 1946 and 1949.

On 4 July 1947, Wain married Marianne Uffenheimer (born 1924), but they divorced in 1956. He then married Eirian Mary James (1920–1988), deputy director of the recorded sound department of the British Council, on 1 January 1960. They had three sons and lived mainly in Wolvercote, Oxford. Wain married his third wife, Patricia Adams (born 1942 or 1943), an art teacher, in 1989. He died in Oxford on 24 May 1994.

== Literary career ==
Wain wrote his first novel, Hurry on Down, in 1953: a comic picaresque story about an unsettled university graduate who rejects the standards of conventional society. Other notable novels include Strike the Father Dead (1962), a tale of a jazzman's rebellion against his conventional father, and Young Shoulders (1982), winner of the Whitbread Prize, in which a young boy deals with the death of loved ones.

Wain was also a prolific poet and critic, with critical works on fellow Midland writers Arnold Bennett, Samuel Johnson (winning him the 1974 James Tait Black Memorial Prize), and Shakespeare. Others for whom he wrote included the Americans Theodore Roethke and Edmund Wilson. He himself was the subject of a bibliography by David Gerard.

== Academic career ==
Wain taught at the University of Reading during the late 1940s and early 1950s, and in 1963 spent a term as professor of rhetoric at Gresham College, London. He was the first fellow in creative arts at Brasenose College, Oxford (1971–1972), and was appointed a supernumerary fellow in 1973. In the same year he was elected to the five-year post of Professor of Poetry at the University of Oxford: some of his lectures appear in his book Professing Poetry. Wain was appointed a CBE in 1984. He was made an honorary fellow of his old college, St John's, Oxford, in 1985.

== Literary associations ==
Wain was often referred to as one of the "Angry Young Men", a term applied to 1950s writers such as John Braine, John Osborne, Alan Sillitoe and Keith Waterhouse, as radicals who opposed the British establishment and conservative elements of society at that time. Indeed, he contributed to Declaration, an anthology by writers associated with the philosophy, and a chapter of his novel Hurry on Down was excerpted in a popular paperback sampler, Protest: The Beat Generation and the Angry Young Men.

Yet it may be more accurate to link Wain with The Movement, a group of post-war poets including Kingsley Amis, D. J. Enright, Thom Gunn, Donald Davie, Elizabeth Jennings and Philip Larkin. Amis and Larkin, good friends of Wain's for a time, were also associated with the "Angries". But aside from their poetry, it may be more apposite to refer to them, as was sometimes done at the time, as "The New University Wits" – writers who wished to communicate rather than experiment and often did so in a comic manner. However, they all became more serious after their initial work. Wain is still known for his poetry (for example, his Apology for Understatement) and literary interests (contributions to The Observer), although his work is no longer as popular as it was. Critical remarks about him by Amis and Larkin in their posthumously published letters may have contributed to dimming his reputation.

Wain's tutor at Oxford had been C. S. Lewis. He encountered, but did not see himself as a part of, the group of Lewis's literary acquaintances, the Inklings. Wain was as serious about literature as the Inklings, and believed, as they did, in the primacy of literature as communication, but as a modern realist writer he shared neither their conservative social beliefs nor their propensity for fantasy.

== Works ==
=== Novels ===
- Hurry on Down (1953), also Born in Captivity (US title)
- Living in the Present (1955)
- The Contenders (1958)
- A Travelling Woman (1959)
- Strike the Father Dead (1962)
- The Young Visitors (1965)
- The Smaller Sky (1967)
- A Winter in the Hills (1970)
- The Pardoner's Tale (1978)
- Lizzie's Floating Shop (1981)
- Young Shoulders (1982), also The Free Zone Starts Here (winner of the Whitbread Prize)
- Where the Rivers Meet (1988)
- Comedies (1990)
- Hungry Generations (1994)

=== Poetry ===
- A Word Carved on a Sill (1956)
- Weep Before God (1961)
- Wildtrack (1965)
- Letters to Five Artists, poems (1969)
- Feng, a poem (1975)
- Poems 1949–79 (1980)
- Poems for the Zodiac (1980)
- The Twofold (1981)
- Open Country (1987)

=== Short stories ===
- Manhood (1980)
- The Valentine Generation
- Down our Way
- A Message from the Pig-man

=== Plays ===
- Johnson is Leaving (1973), monodrama
- Harry in the Night (1975)
- Frank (1984), radio play

=== Short story collections ===
- Nuncle and Other Stories (1960)
- Death of the Hind Legs and Other Stories (1966)
- The Life Guard (1971)

=== Literary criticism ===
- Interpretations, essays on twelve English poems (1955 and 1972)
- Preliminary Essays (1957)
- American Allegory (1959)
- Strength and Isolation in "The Living Milton", ed. Frank Kermode (1960)
- Essays on Literature and Ideas (1963)
- The Living World of Shakespeare, a playgoer's guide (1964)
- Theodore Roethke (1964) (in Critical Quarterly)
- Arnold Bennett (1967)
- A House for the truth, critical essays (1972)
- Johnson as critic (1973)
- An Edmund Wilson celebration (1978)
- Edmund Wilson, the man and his work (1978)
- Professing poetry (1979)
- Introduction to Milton's Paradise Lost (1991) published by The Folio Society (2003)
- The Journals of James Boswell, 1762-1795 (1992) editor

=== Biography ===
- Sprightly Running: Part of an Autobiography (1962)
- Samuel Johnson: A Biography (1975)
- Dear Shadows. Portraits from Memory (1986)

== See also ==
- List of Gresham Professors of Rhetoric
- John Wain Collection at the Harry Ransom Center

== Literature ==
- Elizabeth Hatziolou, 1997. John Wain, A Man of Letters
- Diana Glyer, 2007. The Company They Keep: C. S. Lewis and J. R. R. Tolkien as Writers in Community ISBN 978-0-87338-890-0
- Edward Black, 1965. "L'Art de John Wain, poète": PhD thesis, Université de Caen, 1965
- K. Kumar, 1999. "The Novels of John Wain"; PhD thesis, Ranchi University
