= A Grass Rope =

1957 book by William Mayne

- First edition cover
- Author: William Mayne
- Illustrator: Lynton Lamb
- Language: English
- Genre: Children's novel
- Published: 1957 (Oxford University Press)
- Publication place: United Kingdom
- Pages: 166 pp (first edition)
- ISBN: 0-19-271049-4 (unknown edition)
- OCLC: 7567444
- LC Class: PZ8.M457 Gr

A Grass Rope is a children's novel by William Mayne, first published by Oxford in 1957 with illustrations by Lynton Lamb. Mayne won the annual Carnegie Medal recognising the year's best children's book by a British subject.

Set in the Yorkshire Dales, it is a simple story subtly told, steeped in the past and with a strong sense of place. The story of the hunt for a lost treasure is interwoven with descriptions of daily life on a farm and of the local scenery.

== Plot summary ==
When Adam Forrest comes to re-paint the outside of the Unicorn Inn in Vendale he is determined to make sense of an old story told in the Dyson and Owland families. Long ago, it is said, Dyson the innkeeper desired to marry Gertrude Owland, the daughter of a knight, who lived on the other side of the ridge in Thoradale. She was willing, but the knight refused permission and trained a pack of hounds, together with a fierce unicorn brought from overseas, to defend her. Dyson used magic to entice the animals into the land of the fairies under the fell, while he eloped with Gertrude. However, he did not know that all the Owland fortune was in the collars of the animals, and he was later drowned by the fairies while trying to retrieve it. According to local legend, the hounds can sometimes still be heard hunting under the hill.

Mary and Nan Owland live at Lew Farm, near the site of the old Owland house. Mary is young enough to believe in the fairies of the tale and to believe that the hounds and the unicorn are still alive under the fell, while her older sister Nan does not believe any of it. Adam thinks there is a common-sense explanation and, quite possibly, a treasure to find. While repainting the inn sign he finds an ancient hunting horn embedded in the frame. He guesses that Dyson used it to draw the hounds towards a steep black cliff between the dales known as Yowncorn Yat (local dialect for "Unicorn Gate"), the cliff having acted as an echo wall.

One night Mary sneaks out to Yowncorn Yat and crawls through a tunnel under the hill which she thinks is an entrance to fairyland. She catches one of the "hounds", which turns out to be a fox, and unknowingly picks up some silver treasure and a horned skull at the bottom of a mineshaft. The ending is thus ambiguous, with Adam sure he has worked it all out rationally, except that he cannot account for the skull, which it seems could only have belonged to a unicorn.

== Characters ==
Children

- Mary Owland, a little girl who lives at Lew Farm in Thoradale
- Nan Owland, Mary's older sister, in her first year at grammar school
- Adam Forrest, the Head Boy at Thornton Grammar School
- Peter Dyson, Mildred's son, Mary's classmate, Adam's cousin

Adults

- Mr Owland (Daddy), the farmer at Lew Farm
- Mrs Owland (Mother)
- Charley, a farmhand at Lew Farm
- Mildred Dyson, the licensee at the Unicorn Inn in Vendale

Animals

- Dump, the house dog at Lew Farm
- Hewlin, the dog at the Unicorn Inn
- Frag, a toad
- A vixen and her cubs

== Themes and literary significance ==
A Grass Rope was awarded the Carnegie Medal for 1957. One of William Mayne's earlier novels, it shares several features with his other books of the period. These include an unusual treasure hunt, a problem to be resolved, the lack of "heroes" or "villains", and the slow revelation of character through dialogue. It followed Mayne's The World Upside Down (1954) in being partly set in Vendale, also the scene of Earthfasts (1966) which is known for its TV adaptation. The emphasis on the geographical setting, as seen through the eyes of a child, is also typical of Mayne's style. It has been said that his stories grow inevitably out of their settings. The resolution of the novel provides a satisfactory balance of old and new, traditional story and modern fact, magic and science. There is strong use of authentic North Yorkshire dialect in the book—the expressions are either clear from the context or unobtrusively explained.

== See also ==
Awards
Preceded by The Last Battle	Carnegie Medal recipient 1957	Succeeded by Tom's Midnight Garden
