= Piedra de Sol =

Poem by Octavio Paz

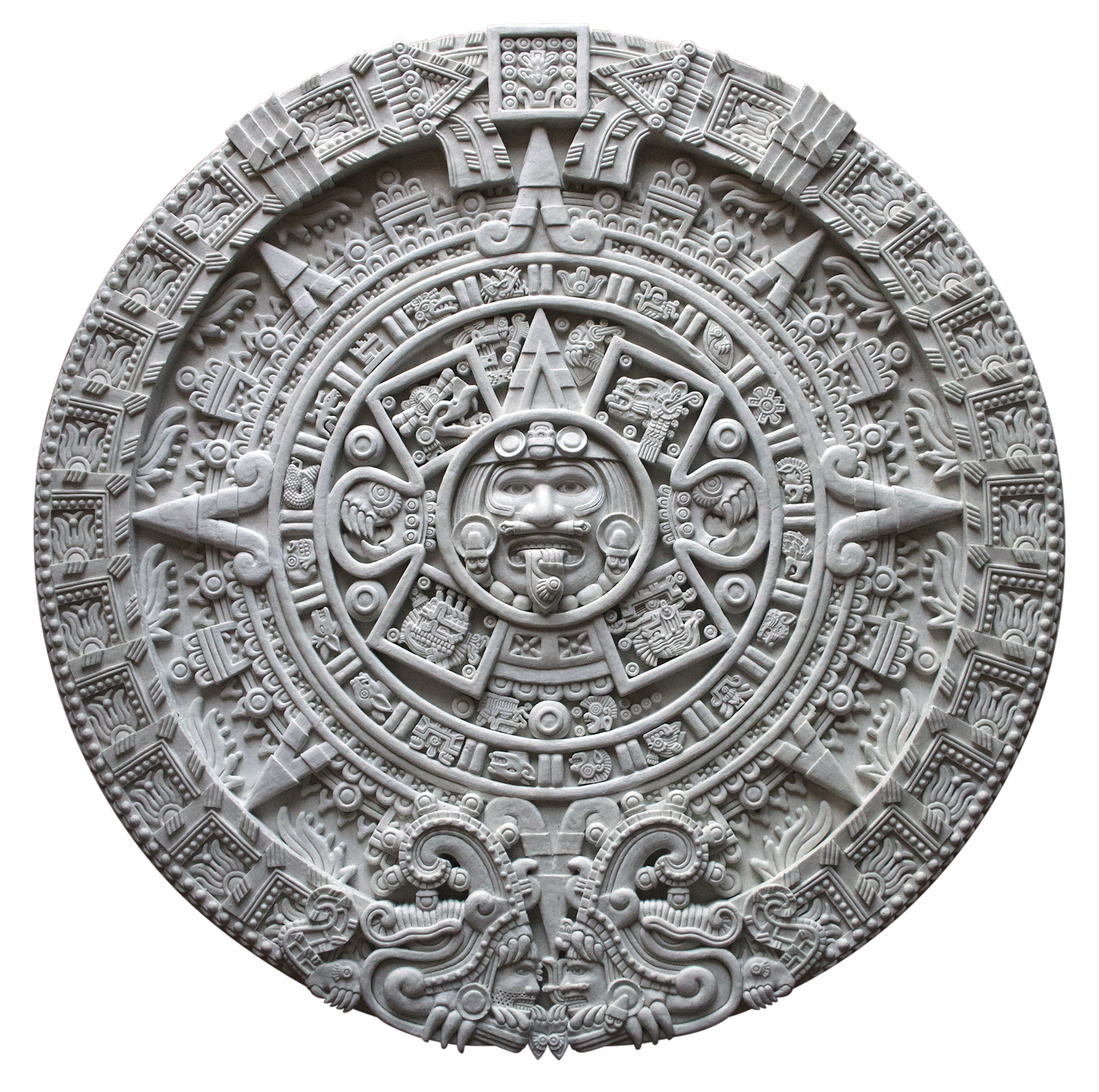
The Aztec sun stone after which the poem is named, and used on the cover of some editions

Piedra de Sol ("Sunstone") is a poem written by Octavio Paz in 1957 that helped launch his international reputation. In the presentation speech of his Nobel Prize in 1990, Sunstone was later praised as "one of the high points of Paz's poetry…This suggestive work with its many layers of meaning seems to incorporate, interpret and reconstrue major existential questions, death, time, love and reality".

== The poem ==
Sunstone is a circular poem based on the circular Aztec calendar, and consists of a single cyclical sentence reflecting the synodic period of the planet Venus. The poem has 584 lines in hendecasyllables, corresponding to that 584-day period, and its ongoing thrust is emphasised by having no full stops, only commas, semi-colons and colons. The first six lines of the poem repeat themselves again at the end of the poem in a movement that "doubles back, and comes full circle,/ forever arriving".

The poem was welcomed in Mexico as an abandonment of Paz's European surrealistic style and a return to the "sensible inner voice" of his earlier preoccupations. In it, instead of imposing his interpretation of history upon the poem, Paz submits himself to the historical calendar and finds his own interpretation within it. As he later explained in an interview:

What I mean to say is that, over the circular time of myth, is inserted the unrepeatable history of one man that belongs to one country, to one generation and one era…Time may be cyclical, and thus immortal…but man is finite and unrepeatable. What is repeated is the experience of finitude: all men know that they will die…These experiences are historical, they happen and they happen to us…At the same time they are not historical, they are repeated.

In this way, according to the analysis of the poem by José Emilio Pacheco, while Paz recapitulates personal experiences, he also balances these with female cultural figures (Melusine, Laura, Persephone, Isabel, Maria) in "an interplay between the private and the collective" where "the poet reads himself as he reads history" in a dialogue from which he cannot emerge.

== Translations ==
Three years after its publication, the poem was translated into Swedish by Artur Lundkvist, and appeared as Solsten in the composite volume Den våldsamma årstiden (1960). It was followed by translations into French by Benjamin Péret (Pierre de Soleil, Gallimard, Paris, 1962); into Hungarian by György Somlyó (Napköve, Magyar Helikon, Budapest 1965); and into Greek by Serge Makais (Ηλιόπετρα, 1965).

There have also been four translations into English. Muriel Rukeyser's was published as Sun Stone/Piedra de Sol in a bilingual edition (New Directions, 1962) and was followed by Peter Miller's Sun-Stone in Canada (Contact, Toronto, 1963) and Donald Gardner's Piedra de Sol: The Sun Stone in the UK (Cosmos Publications, York, 1969). Another translation by Eliot Weinberger was published in 1987 as the first poem in the composite The Collected Poems of Octavio Paz, 1957–1987 (New Directions, New York, 1987). In 1991 the translated poem appeared separately in an illustrated bilingual edition from New Directions Publishing.
