= Mark Clifton =

American writer

- Born: 1906
- Died: 1963 (aged 56–57)
- Occupations: Writer, personnel manager
- Writing career
- Genre: Science fiction
- Notable works: When They Come From Space, They'd Rather Be Right, "Star Bright"
- Notable awards: Hugo Award, Cordwainer Smith Rediscovery Award

Mark Irwin Clifton (Oct 24, 1906–Oct 25, 1963) was an American science fiction writer, the co-winner of the second Hugo Award for best novel. He began publishing in May 1952 with the widely anthologized story "What Have I Done?".

== Works ==
=== "Bossy" and "Ralph Kennedy" ===
About half of his work falls into two series: the "Bossy" series, about a computer with artificial intelligence, was written either alone or in collaboration with Alex Apostolides or Frank Riley; and the "Ralph Kennedy" series, which is more comical, and was written mostly solo, including the novel When They Come From Space, although there was one collaboration with Apostolides.

=== "Star, Bright" ===
Clifton's other most popular short story is "Star, Bright," the first of three appearances in Horace Gold's Galaxy (July 1952), about a super-intelligent toddler with psychic powers. From Clifton's correspondence we know that Gold "editorially savaged" the story, which appeared in severely truncated or altered form. The story has been compared favorably to Kuttner and Moore's "Mimsy Were the Borogoves," which was published in Astounding magazine nine years earlier.

=== They'd Rather Be Right ===
Clifton gained his greatest success with his novel They'd Rather Be Right (also known as The Forever Machine), co-written with Riley, which was serialized in Astounding during 1954, and which was awarded the Hugo Award.

== Personal life ==
Clifton worked for many years as a personnel manager and interviewed "over 200,000" people according to a personal letter he wrote to Judith Merril, quoted in The Science Fiction of Mark Clifton. This experience formed much of Clifton's attitude about the delusions people have of themselves, but also the greatness of which they are capable.

== Legacy ==
Barry N. Malzberg wrote in The Science Fiction of Mark Clifton that "Clifton was an innovator in the early 1950s and such an impressive innovator that his approach has become standard among science fiction writers. He used the common themes of science fiction -- alien invasion, expanding technology, revolution against political theocracy, and space colonization -- but unlike any writer before him, he imposed upon these standard themes the full range of sophisticated psychological insight."

Clifton's fame ebbed quickly, and he received the 2010 Cordwainer Smith Rediscovery Award for unjust obscurity.

== Bibliography ==
=== Non-series novels ===
- Eight Keys to Eden (1960)

=== "Bossy" series ===
- "Crazy Joey" (short story, 1953) [with Alex Apostolides]
- "Hide! Hide! Witch!" (short story, 1953) [with Alex Apostolides]
- They'd Rather Be Right (novel, 1954) [with Frank Riley]

=== "Ralph Kennedy" series ===
- "What Thin Partitions" (short story, 1953) [with Alex Apostolides]
- "Sense from Thought Divide" (short story, March 1955)
- "How Allied" (short story, March 1957)
- "Remembrance and Reflection" (short story, January 1958)
- When They Come from Space (1962), also known as Pawn of the Black Fleet

=== Anthologies ===
- The Science Fiction of Mark Clifton (Southern Illinois University Press, 1980)
- What Have I Done?: The Stories of Mark Clifton (2020)

=== Other short fiction ===
- What Have I Done? (May 1952)
- Star, Bright (July 1952)
- The Conqueror (1952)
- The Kenzie Report (1953)
- Bow Down to Them (1953)
- Progress Report (1953) with Alex Apostolides
- Solution Delayed (1953) with Alex Apostolides
- Civilized (1953) with Alex Apostolides
- Reward for Valor (1953)
- A Woman's Place (1955)
- Clerical Error (February 1956)
- "Do Unto Others" (in If magazine, June 1958)
- What Now, Little Man? (December 1959)
- Hang Head, Vandal! (April 1962)
