= Letter from Peking =

1957 novel by Pearl S. Buck

- First edition
- Author: Pearl S. Buck
- Original title: Letter from Peking
- Language: English
- Genre: Historical novel
- Publisher: John Day Company
- Publication date: 1957
- Publication place: United States
- Media type: Print (Hardback & Paperback)
- Pages: 252 pp

Letter from Peking is a 1957 novel by Pearl S. Buck. The story is about a loving interracial marriage between Gerald and Elizabeth MacLeod, their separation due to the communist uprising in China in 1949, and their separate lives in China and America.

== Plot summary ==
In September 1950, Elizabeth MacLeod is living in her childhood farm home in Raleigh, Vermont, with her 17-year-old son Rennie. The mailman arrives three mornings each week, and each time Elizabeth hopes for a letter from her husband Gerald in China, where she lived with him until Rennie was twelve. They lived in Peking until the war with Japan, then escaped to Chungking. She and her husband are very much in love, but Gerald, a Eurasian, sent her and Rennie to America because the communist uprising in China made it dangerous for white people. He is half Chinese and chose to stay in his own country.

Gerald rarely writes because communication with westerners is banned by the Communists. Letters must be smuggled out. Today her husband writes, "Whatever I do now, remember that it is you I love." The letter continues. She locks the letter in her desk. This is the first letter from Gerald in three months. It is mailed from Hong Kong. It is the last letter from him.

Elizabeth takes care of her son and the farm. Her parents are long dead. Matt Greene helps take care of the farm. Elizabeth is aware of an American prejudice against the Chinese, and her son is one-quarter Chinese. She misses her husband very much. Over the winter she remembers their days together and the Chinese man that she loves. In the spring, after the sugaring is done, Elizabeth and Rennie go to Little Spring, Kansas, to bring Rennie's grandfather MacLeod, Baba, to live with them in Vermont. He left Peking when the Japanese invaded China. He lives in a herder's shack on Sam Blaine's farm. He wears Chinese gowns rather than western suits, reads a few old Chinese books, and he has become forgetful. Rennie is embarrassed by how Chinese his grandfather is. Baba dons western clothes for the train ride to Vermont. The local doctor, Bruce Spauldin, believes he has had strokes. Elizabeth remembers he was witty and bright when she and Gerald lived with him in Peking. "He is sweet and gentle and easy to live with, and he does not complain."

Elizabeth asks Baba about Gerald's mother, Ai-lan. Elizabeth never knew her. They were married when Baba was advisor to the Emperor. Baba liked his wife Ai-lan, the sister of his friend Han Yu-Ren - but he did not love her. After Gerald was born, Ai-lan became interested in Sun Yat-sen's ideas for revolution. Baba supported the Emperor. Ai-lan believed the races could never mingle. She moved south, became a violent revolutionist, and was killed in 1930 by the secret police of the Nationalist government. Gerald saw her infrequently but longed for her. His father would not let Ai-lan "contaminate" Gerald. The next day, the postman brought a magazine mailed from a post office box in Peking. There was a picture of Gerald's mother on the cover. The magazine was dedicated to a martyr of the revolution. In this way Elizabeth learns that Gerald knew all about his mother, though he never spoke of her.

That summer Rennie falls in love. He and Elizabeth talk about Rennie's Chinese relatives. Rennie wants to be all American and forget his Chinese relatives, including his father. He's worried that being part Chinese will keep a girl from liking him. Elizabeth meets Allegra, Rennie's girlfriend, and does not think her a good match for her son. Allegra's parents leave with her when Elizabeth tells them Rennie is quarter-Chinese. Her husband and Rennie were registered with the American embassy when they were born, so they are legally Americans. But she knows they must know and they would not approve Gerald and Rennie's Chinese ancestry. Rennie is hurt and angry. She wants her son to find a love as deep as she shares with his father. Rennie leaves home to find Allegra and talk to her.

Baba becomes weaker and more childish that summer. He has strokes. Bruce Spauldin comes to check him. Elizabeth notices that the unmarried Bruce "is even-tempered, inclined to silence and meditation, all good qualities in a husband." Elizabeth realizes that she is alone and lonely, closed off from Peking, though her husband is not dead. She begins to pray. Baba has more strokes and loses all care. Rennie returns and asks, "Mother, why did you let me be born?", angered by his Chinese heritage. He goes to Sam Blaine's ranch for the rest of the summer. Before he goes, Elizabeth tells him about Gerald's mother, his grandmother, Ai-lan.

Gerald's last letter to Elizabeth included a request that Elizabeth ignored. Now Elizabeth receives a letter from Mei-lan, sent through a silk shop in Singapore. Mei-lan requested that Gerald write the previous letter to Elizabeth. Mei-lan wishes to care for her husband in Elizabeth's absence and requests the support of her "older sister." At this point in the story, Gerald's full last-letter to Elizabeth is printed in the book. He requested her support for his decision to stay in China and protect his wife and child by sending them to America. She sends a letter expressing her love for him and her full support of Mei-lan and their husband, Gerald.

Baba becomes weaker, but he remembers that he did not marry Gerald's mother to get a son; he did not want a son. Elizabeth understands how loveless Gerald's childhood was. Elizabeth pulls out Gerald's letters and reads them again. At first he believes in the new government, then his letters become listless. Elizabeth realizes that Gerald is a prisoner. Baba has another stroke. Bruce treats him, then proposes to Elizabeth. She says she is married. Bruce waits.

Mei-lan writes that Gerald is sad and she wants to be friends with Elizabeth. The letter was mailed in Hong Kong, for safety. Elizabeth appreciates the letter from her "younger sister" but knows that her neighbors would not understand her love for Gerald living with Mei-lan in China. Rennie writes that he is studying physics at a mid-western college and paying his way. His roommate, George Bowen, has a very intelligent and good-looking sister. Rennie promises to come home for Christmas. Mei-lan sends letters to Elizabeth through friends in Manila and Bangkok. She tells her how Gerald is doing.

Sam Blaine comes with Rennie at Christmas. Baba does not remember Sam or Rennie very well, but the Christmas gathering is happy. Rennie has grown to become a man. Elizabeth asks about George Bowen's sister. They argue about Gerald's choice to stay in China and Baba's choice to marry a Chinese woman. Elizabeth explains that love is what matters. Sam Blaine proposes to Elizabeth. Baba dies soon after. Elizabeth sees a vision of Gerald dying, then learns from Mei-lan that Gerald died and Mei-lan has a son.

Rennie marries George Bowen's twin sister Mary, with Elizabeth's blessing. George and Mary are orphans and love Rennie. Bruce and Elizabeth consider marrying. Elizabeth considers Baba's loveless life a poor example for living, something she will not endorse.

== Characters ==
- Elizabeth MacLeod (Eve to her husband Gerald) - living at her family's farm in Vermont with her son Rennie after her husband Gerald sent her and him away from Peking.
- Gerald MacLeod - Elizabeth's husband, a university president in Peking, the son of an American father and Chinese mother.
- Rennie MacLeod - Elizabeth's son, age 17 to 20 in the story.
- Matt Greene - caretaker at the Vermont farm.
- grandfather MacLeod (Baba) - Gerald's father, born in Virginia, who left Peking for San Francisco when the Japanese invaded China. He ended up in Little Springs, Kansas, at the farm of Sam Blaine.
- Sam Blaine - American who took in and watched over grandfather MacLeod. Age 42. Grandfather MacLeod had typhoid fever when Sam took him in.
- Dr Bruce Spauldin - The local doctor in Raleigh, Vermont.
- Ai-lan - Gerald's mother. Her fiancé died when she was 15. She married grandfather MacLeod when she was 25, he was 30.
- Mei-lan - Gerald's wife-in-absence, second wife or concubine.
- George Bowen - Rennie's college roommate, the brother of his wife-to-be, Mary.
