= Abdelmajid Benjelloun =

Moroccan novelist, journalist, and ambassador

Abdelmajid Benjelloun (Arabic: عبد المجيد بن جلون, romanized: ʿAbd al-Majīd bin Jallūn; 1919–1981) was a Moroccan novelist, journalist and ambassador.

== Life ==
He was born in Casablanca in 1919. His parents emigrated to England (Manchester) when he was only one year old, where he grew up as the son of a wealthy merchant. He returned to Morocco when he was ten. Benjelloun was politically active in the Moroccan independence movement, this led to him being exiled to Egypt for over 15 years. After Morocco gained independence in 1956 he returned to Morocco. From this date onwards he can be labelled an influential member of Morocco's political and intellectual elite, as he entered the service of the foreign department, serving as ambassador to Pakistan. He became editor of the daily al- 'Alama in addition published a rich amount of essays, short stories and poems.

== Works ==
His famous autobiographical novel Fī ṭ-Ṭufūla (In Childhood), published in 1957, was one of the first Moroccan novels in Arabic. He published Part One of In Childhood in 1957 and Part Two in 1968. The main theme is the conflict between the child's two identities, English and Moroccan. This story is unique for Moroccan literature as for Benjelloun the western ideas are familiar to the child, but the Arab country is unknown. By writing In Childhood he marked a shift in attitudes towards autobiographical writing in Morocco. He marked a shift away from the traditional Arabic modes of writing towards the contemporary, western approach. This marks the significance of his autobiography, as it lays the foundation for a new era of literature in Morocco. Benjelloun's western approach can best be understood by his upbringing, as he grew up in Manchester until later moving to Morocco. This will have an influence on his writing as his first cultural identity was English instead of Moroccan.

The notion of language is a powerful theme. Benjelloun had only spoken English in Manchester, noting an ignorance of Arabic. Through the auto-biography we see the learning of Arabic as a personal triumph. Language holds a significant impact in regard to the context of language in Morocco. Within Moroccan borders, four languages are spoken; Arabic, Berber, French and Spanish. By writing it in Arabic, this autobiography became a symbol of modern Arab cultural identity and how promoting the Arab language can help to encourage unity.

Another work by Abdelmajid Benjelloun is The Weaver. In this the protagonist feels helpless in his craft as they are threatened by the European factories. This short story relates to the attack the Moroccan nation felt on their national identity. This draws on customs that had been negatively affected as new ethical codes were introduced.

== Bibliography ==
Poetry and novels

- Fi at-Tufula (In Childhood), auto-biographical novel (1957)

On Abdelmajid Benjelloun:

- Simon Gikandi, The Cambridge History of African and Caribbean Literature, p. 192
- Rosa María Ruiz Moreno, "Abd al-Mayid ben Yellun (1915-1981): un pionero de la narrativa marroquí", in: Pérez Beltrán, Carmelo y Ruiz Almodóvar, Caridad (eds), El Magreb : coordenadas socioculturales, 1996, ISBN 84-8144-071-X, pags. 487-504
- Tetz Rooke, Moroccan Autobiography As National Allegory, Oriente Moderno, pgs 289 - 305, 1997.
- Maryame Alami, Gender representation in first wave Moroccan life writing: focus on Abdelmajid Benjelloun's autobiographical novel In Childhood, The Journal of North African Studies, 18:3, pgs 443- 453, 2013.
- Abdellatif Akbib, Birth and Development of the Moroccan Short Story, Rocky Mountain Review of Language and Literature, 54:1, pgs 67 - 87, 2000.
