= Frank Riley (author) =

American novelist

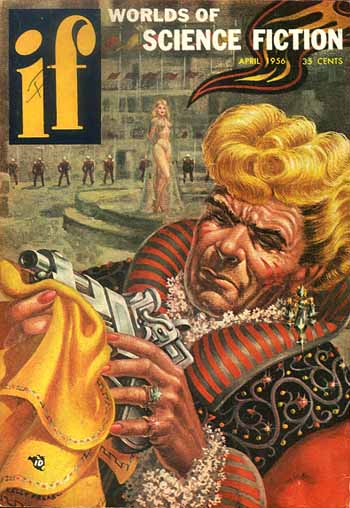
Riley's "The Executioner" was the cover story on the April 1956 issue of If

Frank Riley (1915–1996) was the pseudonym of Frank Ryhlick, an American science fiction author best known for co-writing (with Mark Clifton) the novel They'd Rather Be Right, which won a Hugo Award for Best Novel during 1955. He was a syndicated travel columnist and editor for the Los Angeles Times, and editor of the Los Angeles Magazine. He also wrote advertisements for See's Candies, screenplays, short fiction such as the "Father Anton Dymek" mysteries and was a host of a radio program in the Los Angeles area.

His notable screenplays include Mr. Winkle Returns (1954), Three Wise Boys (1963), and A Letter to Nancy (1965).

Frank was born on June 8, 1915 in Minnesota, USA. He was married to Elfriede Stobbe, and had a son. Frank died on April 24, 1996 in Manhattan Beach, California, USA.
