= Playing with Fire (Vailland novel) =

1945 novel by Roger Vailland

Drôle de jeu
- later 1960s Le Livre de Poche edition of the novel
- Author: Roger Vailland
- Language: French
- Publisher: Éditions Corrêa
- Publication date: 1945
- Publication place: France

Drôle de jeu is a prize winning 1945 French novel by Roger Vailland first published by Éditions Corrêa. The work explores the ironies of the French Resistance.

It was published in English in a translation by Gerard Hopkins as Playing with Fire by Chatto & Windus in 1948. Although Vailland later tried to play down the autobiographical elements in the novel, these have been documented by his biographers.
