= They'd Rather Be Right =

1954 novel by Mark Clifton and Frank Riley

- Dust-jacket of the first edition
- Author: Mark Clifton & Frank Riley
- Cover artist: W. I. van der Poel
- Language: English
- Genre: Science fiction
- Publisher: Gnome Press (1957 novel)
- Publication date: 1954 (as a serial), 1957 (as a novel)
- Publication place: United States
- Media type: Print (Hardcover)
- Pages: 189
- Award: Hugo Award for Best Novel (1955)

They'd Rather Be Right (also known as The Forever Machine) is a science fiction novel by American writers Mark Clifton and Frank Riley.

== Plot ==
Two professors create an advanced cybernetic brain, which they call "Bossy." Bossy can "optimise your mind...and give you eternal youth into [sic] the bargain, but only if you're ready to abandon all your favourite prejudices." However, when given the choice of admitting they were wrong and therefore being able to benefit from Bossy's abilities, most people would rather be right, and Bossy's ability to confer immortality is almost made ineffective by humanity's fear of "her."

== Reception and significance ==
They'd Rather Be Right somewhat controversially won the Hugo Award for best novel in 1955, the second Hugo ever presented for a novel.

In a brief 1982 review of a contemporary reprint of the novel, author David Langford wrote that "though it contains an interesting idea, the book seems an implausible award-winner. It's fine (...) to postulate a machine giving immortality, youth and a perfect complexion to those and only those who can cast aside preconceptions and prejudices (...) The idea, though, is flattened into the ground by the authors' reluctance to do the work which would make it convincing."

Langford has also addressed conspiracy theories attributing They'd Rather Be Right's win to Scientology, saying it is more likely that Clifton was popular for his short stories.

Galaxy Science Fiction reviewer Floyd C. Gale faulted the novel, saying, "although a passably workmanlike job, loose ends outnumber neat knits in this yarn."

In 2008 Sam Jordison described the novel as "appalling," the "worst ever winner [of the Hugo Award]," and "a basic creative writing 'how not to,'" saying that its win "by public vote (...) raises serious questions about the value of a universal franchise." Similarly, Lawrence Watt-Evans has noted that They'd Rather Be Right is "the usual [book] cited" as the "worst book ever to win [the Hugo Award]", and Rick Cook responded to the question of "Is the book any good?" with "No," going on to explain that it originated as "one of those tailored-to-order serials for the old Astounding. Sometimes those things worked and sometimes they didn't. This one didn't."

James Nicoll found it "not as awful as it could have been", noting the plausibility of Joe's abusive childhood, and calling Mabel "an amusing character who would have fared better as a rejuvenated libertine in a Thorne Smith novel." However, Nicoll also emphasized the extent to which the book is predicated on concepts that were of particular interest to Astounding editor John W. Campbell, and observed that "(s)tructurally, the book is a mess" because it is a fix-up created at a time when fix-up techniques were still primitive: "it reads like a series of short stories whose unifying theme was 'we'd sure like Mr. Campbell to pay us.'"

== Publication history ==
Cover of the August 1954 issue of Astounding Science Fiction, which carried the first story of what subsequently became the novel. Art by Kelly Freas.

They'd Rather Be Right was first published as a four-part serial in Astounding Science Fiction from August 1954 to November 1954. It was published as a book in 1957, and a heavily cut version was released the following year under the title The Forever Machine. The novel has been reprinted a few times in the decades since, including at least two foreign language translations.

They'd Rather Be Right is a sequel to the short story "Crazy Joey" by Mark Clifton and Alex Apostolides (August 1953, originally published in Astounding Science Fiction) and the novelette "Hide! Hide! Witch!" by Mark Clifton and Alex Apostolides (originally published as the cover story of the December 1953 issue of Astounding Science Fiction).

Both "Crazy Joey" and "Hide! Hide! Witch!" appeared without They'd Rather Be Right in The Science Fiction of Mark Clifton, edited by Barry N. Malzberg and Martin H. Greenberg (Southern Illinois University Press; December 8, 1980). ISBN 978-0809309856

In 1992, Carroll & Graf Publishers re-issued They'd Rather Be Right with its two prequels, "Crazy Joey" and "Hide! Hide! Witch!", under the title The Forever Machine. In this volume, the short story "Crazy Joey" and the novelette "Hide! Hide! Witch!" comprise the first section, entitled "Crazy Joey," while the novel They'd Rather Be Right makes up the second section, entitled "Bossy." ISBN 978-0881848427

When the novel was included into The Second Golden Age of Science Fiction Megapack (2014) by Wildside Press, it was the 1992 Carroll & Graf Publishers version containing the two prequels, but under the title They'd Rather Be Right. ISBN 978-1-4794-0294-6

== Sources ==
- Chalker, Jack L.; Mark Owings (1998). The Science-Fantasy Publishers: A Bibliographic History, 1923-1998. Westminster, MD and Baltimore: Mirage Press, Ltd. p. 306.
