= John Sandoe =

British bookseller (1930–2007)

John Sandoe (10 July 1930 – 29 December 2007) was a British bookseller, and the founder in 1957 of the bookshop John Sandoe Books in what had previously been a poodle parlour on Blacklands Terrace off King's Road, near Sloane Square. The Times called him "one of London's leading independent booksellers".

== Early life ==
John Sandoe was born in Felixstowe on 10 July 1930, the son of a stockbroker and moneylender, and the only child of two only children. He was educated at St Edward's School, Oxford.

== Career ==
Sandoe's main competitor was Heywood Hill in Mayfair.

Regulars included Mary Quant, Keith Richards, Lucian Freud, Chips Channon, Dirk Bogarde and Tom Stoppard.

== Personal life ==
In 1962 he met the Canadian artist Paul Sinodhinos, who became his lifelong partner.

John Sandoe Books still exists in its original location.
