= Bray Hammond =

American financial historian

- Born: November 20, 1886
- Died: July 20, 1968 (aged 81)
- Writing career
- Notable work: Banks and Politics in America from the Revolution to the Civil War (1957)
- Notable awards: 1958 Pulitzer Prize for History

Bray Hammond (November 20, 1886 – July 20, 1968) was an American financial historian and assistant secretary to the Board of Governors of the Federal Reserve System in 1944–1950. He won the 1958 Pulitzer Prize for History for Banks and Politics in America from the Revolution to the Civil War (1957). He was educated at Stanford University.

== Books ==
- Banks and Politics in America from the Revolution to the Civil War (Princeton University Press, 1957)
- Sovereignty and an Empty Purse: Banks and Politics in the Civil War (Princeton, 1970)
