= Banks and Politics in America =

1957 book by Bray Hammond

- Author: Bray Hammond
- Language: English
- Publisher: Princeton University Press
- Publication date: 1957
- Publication place: United States

Banks and Politics in America (1957) (ISBN 0691005532) is a book by Bray Hammond, which describes the differences in banking and politics in the United States between the American Revolution and the Civil War period. The book was awarded the 1958 Pulitzer Prize for History.
