= Declaration (anthology) =

1957 anthology of essays edited by Tom Maschler

- First edition
- Author: Tom Maschler (editor)
- Language: English
- Publisher: MacGibbon & Kee
- Publication date: 1957; 69 years ago
- Publication place: United Kingdom
- Pages: 202

Declaration is a 1957 anthology of essays by British writers. It was edited by Tom Maschler and published by MacGibbon & Kee. It features short essays by Doris Lessing, Colin Wilson, John Osborne, John Wain, Kenneth Tynan, Bill Hopkins, Lindsay Anderson and Stuart Holroyd. The book is closely associated with the angry young men movement, and the essays are presented as "credos" or manifesto of the writers.

== Contents ==
- Introduction by Tom Maschler
- "The small personal voice" by Doris Lessing
- "Beyond the outsider" by Colin Wilson
- "They call it cricket" by John Osborne
- "Along the tightrope" by John Wain
- "Theatre and living" by Kenneth Tynan
- "Ways without a precedent" by Bill Hopkins
- "Get out and push!" by Lindsay Anderson
- "A sense of crisis" by Stuart Holroyd

== Publication ==
The book was published in the United Kingdom in 1957 through MacGibbon & Kee and was a success in its day. An American edition was published in 1958 by E. P. Dutton. A sequel, Conviction, this time edited by Norman MacKenzie, was published by MacGibbon & Kee in 1958.

== Reception ==
Virginia P. Held of The Reporter described the book as "chiefly valuable as an expression of a generation", which she called "an up-from-zero generation". Held elaborated:

The critics have almost exclusively stressed the nihilism of these 'angry young men,' often using the label in an attempt to ridicule them, and in doing so have missed the point. It isn't their nihilism that distinguishes these writers, but their unwillingness to remain nihilists. The zero is where they start, not where they end up; they know they must move up from it somehow.

Leslie A. Fiedler wrote in the Saturday Review that the writers were introduced as "brilliant and iconoclastic" on the jacket of the book, but thought that none of them "strikes one as really 'brilliant' (Tynan is funny enough by fits and starts and Osborne vigorously direct, but the rest are merely earnest and opaque), while their 'iconoclasm' consists of nothing more shocking than complaints against bureaucracy, the monarchy, and H-bomb tests, eked out with attacks on each other." Concerning the "angry young men" label, Fiedler went on to question Lessing's youth, the source of Osborne's anger, and all the writers' decision to contribute to the anthology; Kingsley Amis had been asked to participate but declined, which Fiedler commended. Fiedler continued:

Despite Mr. Osborne's protest that he is not the protagonist of Look Back in Anger and the desperate plea of all the accused that they are not Amis's Lucky Jim [from Lucky Jim], it is evident that they write the same dialogue for themselves as for their characters. For such angry-young-dialogue one is finally grateful; it is what makes Mr. Osborne's piece, along with Mr. Tynan's, a hiatus of brightness in a dim, dim book. But even the Angries, when they leave their lovely scorn and speak affirmatively, sound like all the other contributors, merge into the general middlebrow revolt against shrillness and despair.
