= Stuart Holroyd =

British writer (1933–2025)

- Born: 10 August 1933; Bradford, Yorkshire, England
- Died: 4 February 2025 (aged 91)
- Education: University College London (did not graduate)
- Occupation: Author
- Spouse(s): Anne Elizabeth Freeman; then Susan Joy Bennett
- Writing career
- Period: 20th century
- Genres: Philosophy, literary criticism, parapsychology, contacts with extraterrestrial life, sexual love

Stuart Holroyd (10 August 1933 – 4 February 2025) was a British writer.

Born in Bradford, Yorkshire, he first came to prominence for the philosophical and critical works produced during his close association with the writers Colin Wilson and Bill Hopkins, but subsequently wrote prolifically on parapsychology, contacts with extraterrestrial life, sexual love and other topics.

== Life and career ==
The son of Thomas Holroyd and Edith (King) Holroyd, Stuart Holroyd attended University College London (1957–58) but left without completing his degree.

He published his first book, Emergence from Chaos, in 1957 at the age of twenty-three. The same publisher, Victor Gollancz, had recently published The Outsider, the first book by Holroyd's friend Colin Wilson. Wilson and Holroyd, along with the novelist Bill Hopkins, were associated with the literary movement known as the Angry Young Men. In the same year, Holroyd, Wilson and Hopkins each contributed an essay to Declaration – an anthology of statements by writers and artists then labelled, rightly or wrongly, as Angry Young Men (the contributors included not only John Osborne and Kingsley Amis but Doris Lessing and the director Lindsay Anderson). On 9 March 1958, Holroyd's play, The Tenth Chance was produced at the Royal Court Theatre; disturbances in the audience during the single performance, and a subsequent confrontation in a nearby public house involving Kenneth Tynan, Christopher Logue and Colin Wilson were widely reported.

Emergence from Chaos was a literary/psychological study of several modern poets. Holroyd's next book, Flight and Pursuit (1959) was an autobiographical examination of the author's search for "spiritual values".

In 1961, Holroyd married Susan Joy Bennett. (He was earlier married to Anne Elizabeth Freeman, they married in 1950 and divorced in 1958.) With the exception of a textbook on English literature (The English Imagination), Holroyd did not publish another book for fourteen years. Contraries; A Personal Progression, which appeared in 1975, was a memoir of the "angry" years of the late 1950s, containing portraits of Wilson and Hopkins.

Holroyd thereafter turned his attention to different subjects, writing a series of books on the paranormal, parapsychology, encounters with extraterrestrial life, gnosticism and the philosophy of Krishnamurti—work which he later described as "whoring" in the literary market place.

His publication, His Dear Time's Waste (Pronoia Books, 2013) is described as "a 1950s literary and love life memoir", a re-issue of the amended text of Contraries, with substantial additions derived from journals, correspondence and other early writings, together with reflections from a present point of view.

Holroyd died on 4 February 2025, at the age of 91.

== Bibliography ==
=== Books ===
- Emergence from Chaos (1957)
- Flight and Pursuit (1959)
- The English Imagination (1969)
- Contraries: A Personal Progression (1975)
- Magic, Words, and Numbers (1975)
- Dream Worlds (1976)
- PSI and the Consciousness Explosion (1977)
- Prelude to the Landing on Planet Earth (1977)
- Mysteries of the Inner Self (1978)
- Alien Intelligence (1979)
- Briefing for the Landing on Planet Earth (1979)
- With Susan Holroyd The Complete Book of Sexual Love (1979)
- Quest of the Quiet Mind (1980)
- Krishnamurti: The Man, the Mystery & the Message (1991)
- The Elements of Gnosticism (ISBN 1-86204-146-6 Element Books Ltd. 1994)
- His Dear Time's Waste (2013)

=== Plays ===
- The Tenth Chance (1958)

=== Critical essays ===
- "A Sense of Crisis" in Declaration (Edited by Tom Maschler, MacGibbon & Kee, 1957)
- "Revolt and Commitment: Thoughts at Twenty-Five" in Encounter, April 1959

=== Books about ===
- "Stuart Holroyd: Years of Anger and Beyond" by Antoni Diller. Nottingham: Paupers' Press, 2012. ISBN 9780946650149.
