= The Short Reign of Pippin IV =

Novel by John Steinbeck

- Cover of first US edition
- Author: John Steinbeck
- Cover artist: William Pène du Bois
- Language: English
- Subject: French politics
- Genre: Political satire
- Set in: 1950s Paris
- Published: April 15, 1957 (New York:Viking Press); 1957 (London:Heinemann)
- Publication place: United States
- Media type: Print (hardcover)
- Pages: 188
- OCLC: 571093530

The Short Reign of Pippin IV: A Fabrication is a novella by John Steinbeck published in 1957; his only political satire, the book pokes fun at French politics.

== Plot summary ==
Pippin IV explores the life of Pippin Héristal, an amateur astronomer in 1950s France, who is suddenly proclaimed the King of France. Unknowingly appointed to give the Communists a monarchy to revolt against, Pippin is chosen because he was descended from the famous king Charlemagne. Unhappy with his lack of privacy, alteration of family life, uncomfortable housings at the Palace of Versailles and his lack of power as a constitutional monarch, the protagonist spends a portion of the novella dressing up as a commoner, often riding a motorscooter, to avoid the constrained life of a king. Pippin eventually receives his wish of dethronement after the people of France enact the rebellion Pippin's kingship was destined to receive. He returns to his home in Paris to find that nothing has really changed.

== Characters ==
- Pippin Arnulf Héristal - protagonist of the story; he is an amateur astronomer whose bloodline traces back to King Pippin II and to Charlemagne. He later becomes the King of France.
- Marie, Pippin's wife - a practical, buxom woman who becomes Queen of France in a down-to-earth fashion. She likens managing the kingdom to managing a home.
- Clotilde, Pippin's daughter - a best-selling author, inspiration for a religious movement, intellectual prodigy, and Crown Princess, all by the age of twenty. She is a stereotypical youth, clumsy and frivolous.
- Charles Martel - Pippin's uncle, an art and antique dealer who shares a name with the historical figure, an ancient member of his family. He often advises Pippin on tough situations.
- Sister Hyacinthe (née Suzanne Lescault) - a former cabaret performer-turned-nun who provides sage advice to Marie and Pippin.
- Tod Johnson - a young American traveling in Europe who becomes involved with Clotilde; heir to a large fortune from his father, H. W. Johnson, the "Egg King of Petaluma, California". He introduces Pippin to the American way of politics.
