= Graham Hough =

English literary critic, poet and Professor of English

Graham Goulden (or Goulder) Hough (14 February 1908 – 5 September 1990) was an English literary critic, poet, and Professor of English at Cambridge University from 1966 to 1975.

== Life ==
Graham Hough was born in Great Crosby, Lancashire, the son of Joseph and Clara Hough. He was educated at Prescot Grammar School, the University of Liverpool, and Queens' College, Cambridge, where he achieved a first-class in Part II of the English tripos as an affiliated student in 1936. He became a lecturer in English at Raffles College, Singapore, in 1930. In World War II he served as a volunteer with the Singapore Royal Artillery, until taken prisoner and interned in a Japanese prison-camp. After further travelling and teaching in the Far East, Hough returned to Cambridge as a fellow of Christ's College in 1950. He was Tutor at Christ's from 1955 to 1960. In 1958 he was visiting professor at Cornell University. From 1964 to 1975 he was Praelector and Fellow of Darwin College. University Reader in English from 1965 to 1966, he was Professor of English at the university from 1966 to 1975.

He died in Cambridge on 5 September 1990.

== Works ==
- The Last Romantics, 1949
- The Romantic Poets, 1953
- The Dark Sun: a study of D. H. Lawrence, 1956
- Image and Experience: Studies in a Literary Revolution, 1960
- Legends and Pastorals, 1961
- A Preface to the Faerie Queene, 1962
- The Dream and the Task: Literature and Morals in the Culture of Today, 1963
- An Essay on Criticism, 1966
- Style and Stylistics, 1969
- Selected Essays, 1978
- The Mystery Religion of W. B. Yeats, 1984
