= Earthfasts (TV series) =

- Genre: Children's, Drama, Fantasy
- Created by: William Mayne
- Developed by: BBC
- Starring: Chris Downs; Paul Nicholls; Bryan Dick
- Theme music composer: Ilona Sekacz
- Country of origin: United Kingdom
- Original language: English
- No. of episodes: 5

Production
- Production location: North Yorkshire
- Running time: 25 minutes

Original release
- Network: BBC One
- Release: 23 February – 23 March 1994

Earthfasts is a BBC children's drama series based upon the 1966 book of the same title by William Mayne. It was filmed on location in Richmond and Wensleydale, North Yorkshire, and was aired in 1994.

== Plot summary ==
Schoolboys Keith and David (Chris Downs & Paul Nicholls) hear drumming under the hill on the moor near their homes, and set out to investigate. The hillside unexpectedly opens and Nellie Jack John (Bryan Dick), a drummer boy from the 18th century marches into the 20th. Bewildered and lost in a strange world, he decides to go back home.

David discovers that the candle the drummer boy left behind gives off cold rather than heat and does not burn down. Other strange things are happening – standing stones are moving on the moors, the ground is shaking and all the pigs have disappeared.

Obsessed by the candle, David heads underground and does not return. Keith searches for his friend. There is a strange encounter with ghostly warriors.
