= The Law (novel) =

The Law (French: La Loi) is a 1957 novel by French author Roger Vailland. It won the 1957 Prix Goncourt, France's most prestigious literary prize. The novel concerns the social structure of a small village in south Italy in the 1950s. It was reprinted in 2008 by Eland.
