= Angry young men =

Group of British playwrights and novelists

The "angry young men" of the 1950s were a group of mostly working- and middle-class British playwrights and novelists. The group's leading figures included John Osborne and Kingsley Amis; other popular figures included John Braine, Alan Sillitoe, and John Wain. The phrase was originally coined by the Royal Court Theatre's press officer George Fearon in order to promote Osborne's 1956 play Look Back in Anger. It has been suggested by Leslie Paul that it could have been influenced by the title of his own autobiography, Angry Young Man, published in 1951.

Following the success of the Osborne play, the label "angry young men" was later applied by British media to describe young writers who were characterised by a disillusionment with traditional British society. The term, always imprecise, began to have less meaning over the years as the writers to whom it was originally applied became more divergent, and many of them dismissed the label as useless. Literary critic Terry Eagleton noted that the group "weren't exactly a clique since they scarcely knew each other, and apart from being young they shared almost nothing in common, least of all anger."

== John Osborne ==
The playwright John Osborne was the archetypal example, and his signature play Look Back in Anger (1956) attracted attention to a style of drama contrasting strongly with the genteel and understated works of Terence Rattigan that had been in fashion. Osborne's The Entertainer (1957) secured his reputation, with Laurence Olivier playing the protagonist Archie Rice. Osborne became a successful entrepreneur, partnering with Tony Richardson to form the film production company Woodfall. In addition to being seen as archetypal, Osborne was claimed to be one of the leading literary figures of the Angry Young Men "movement". This "movement" was identified after the Second World War as some British intellectuals began to question orthodox mores. Osborne expressed his own concerns through his plays and could be relied upon to provide controversial "angry" pronouncements, delivered with an immaturity compared to impatient youth.

Some critics ridiculed Osborne for a lack of maturity in his statements, and fuelled a debate about his politics and those of the "movement". Osborne also had consistent and often sarcastic criticism of the British Left. In 1961, he made public headlines with "Letter to my Fellow Countrymen" that represented a "damn you, England" mentality and protested against Britain's decision to join the arms race. Osborne strongly expressed anger at what Britain had become at that time, but also at what he felt it had failed to become.

=== Look Back in Anger ===
Osborne's play Look Back in Anger was the literary work that influenced the concept of the Angry Young Man. He wrote the play to express what it felt like to live in England during the 1950s. The main issues that Angry Young Men had were "impatience with the status quo, refusal to be co-opted by a bankrupt society, an instinctive solidarity with the lower classes". Referred to as "kitchen sink realism", literary works began to deal with lower class themes. In the decades prior to Osborne and other authors, less attention had been given to literature that illuminated the treatment and living circumstances experienced by the lower classes. As the Angry Young Men movement began to articulate these themes, the acceptance of related issues was more widespread. Osborne depicted these issues within his play through the eyes of his protagonist, Jimmy. Throughout the play, Jimmy was seeing "the wrong people go hungry, the wrong people be loved, the wrong people dying".

In Britain, following the Second World War, the quality of life for lower-class citizens was still poor; Osborne used this theme to demonstrate how the state of Britain was guilty of neglect towards those who needed assistance the most. In the play there are comparisons of educated people with savages, illuminating the major difference between classes. Alison remarks on this issue while she, Jimmy and Cliff are sharing an apartment, stating how "she felt she had been placed into a jungle". Jimmy was represented as an embodiment of the young, rebellious post-war generation that questioned the state and its actions. Look Back in Anger provided some of its audience with the hope that Osborne's work would revitalise the British theatre and enable it to act as a "harbinger of the New Left".

== Definition and divisions ==
Not all members of the movement were angry, young, or male, but all disliked the title "Angry Young Men". Life in 1958 wrote that "the most common prevailing attitude among them is of wry irritation", and named Osborne, Kingsley Amis, John Wain, and John Braine as the best-known. As a catchphrase, the term was applied to a large, incoherently defined group, and was rejected by most of the writers to whom it was applied: see, for example, "Answer to a Letter from Joe" by Wain (Essays on Literature and Ideas, 1963). Publisher Tom Maschler, who edited a collection of political-literary essays by the 'Angries' (Declaration, 1957), commented: "(T)hey do not belong to a united movement. Far from it; they attack one another directly or indirectly in these pages. Some were even reluctant to appear between the same covers with others whose views they violently oppose".

The Angry Young Men preferred realism, rejecting the experimental literature of the 1920s and 1930s. Life observed that "They hate the 'phony' in any form and mistrust anything that seems precious or preposterous. They are literary conservatives. They would find the Beat Generation preposterous". Their politics were radical, usually left but sometimes right, sometimes anarchistic, and they described social alienation of different kinds. They also often expressed their critical views on society as a whole, criticising certain behaviours or groups in different ways. On television, their writings were often expressed in plays in anthology drama series such as Armchair Theatre (ITV, 1956–68) and The Wednesday Play (BBC, 1964–70); this leads to a confusion with the kitchen sink drama category of the early 1960s.

Throughout the late 1950s and into the 1960s, the "Angries" often met at or were nurtured by the Royal Shakespeare Company, and through this venue other such emerging playwrights as Edward Bond and Wole Soyinka were exposed to the Angry Young Men movement directly.

The New University Wits (a term applied by William Van O'Connor in his 1963 study The New University Wits and the End of Modernism) refers to Oxbridge malcontents who explored the contrast between their upper-class university privilege and their middle-class upbringings. These included Amis, Philip Larkin, and Wain, all of whom were also part of the poetic circle known as "The Movement".

Also included among the Angry Young Men was a small group of young existentialist philosophers, led by Colin Wilson and also including Stuart Holroyd and Bill Hopkins.

Outside of these subgroupings, the 'Angries' included writers mostly of lower-class origin concerned with their political and economic aspirations. Apart from Osborne, these included Harold Pinter, Braine, Arnold Wesker, and Alan Sillitoe. Some of these (e.g., Pinter) were left-wing and some (e.g., Braine) later became right-wing. William Cooper, the early-model Angry Young Man, though Cambridge-educated, was a "provincial" writer in his frankness and material and is included in this group.

== Crosscurrents in the late 1950s ==
A few are friends, but for the most part they know one another slightly if at all, and they are continually writing unfriendly essays about each other in the literary magazines.

— Life, 1958

Friendships, rivalries, and acknowledgments of common literary aims within each of these groups could be intense (the relationship between Amis and Larkin is considered one of the great literary friendships of the 20th century). However, the writers in each group tended to view the other groups with bewilderment and incomprehension. Observers and critics could find no common thread between them all. They were contemporaries by age. They were not of the upper-class establishment, nor were they protégés of existing literary circles. It was essentially a male "movement", but Shelagh Delaney, author of A Taste of Honey (1958), was described as an "angry young woman"; other female members included Iris Murdoch and Doris Lessing.

== Associated writers ==
- Kingsley Amis
- John Arden
- Stan Barstow
- Edward Bond
- John Braine
- Philip Callow
- Shelagh Delaney
- Michael Hastings
- Thomas Hinde
- Stuart Holroyd
- Bill Hopkins
- Bernard Kops
- Doris Lessing
- Iris Murdoch
- John Osborne
- Harold Pinter
- Alan Sillitoe
- David Storey
- Kenneth Tynan
- John Wain
- Keith Waterhouse
- Arnold Wesker
- Colin Wilson

== Other media ==
In the song "Where Are They Now" from the 1973 album Preservation Act 1 by The Kinks, one verse asks, "Where have all the angry young men gone?" and names "Barstow and Osborne, Waterhouse and Sillitoe"; while another verse asks "Where are all the teddy boys now?" and names Jimmy Porter, protagonist of Osborne's Look Back in Anger, and Joe Lampton, protagonist of Braine's Room at the Top.

== See also ==
- British New Wave, also known as the Angry Young Man film genre—a British film genre of the 1960s, featuring working-class heroes and left-wing themes.
- Beat Generation
- Angry Young Men (mini series) - 2024 documentary film which examines the "angry young man" in the 1970s-1980s Hindi films of Salim–Javed, personified by the actor Amitabh Bachchan.
