= William Mayne =

English writer of children's fiction (1928–2010)

William James Carter Mayne
- Born: 16 March 1928; Kingston upon Hull, England
- Died: 24 March 2010 (aged 82); Thornton Rust, England
- Occupation: Writer
- Writing career
- Genre: Children's fiction

William James Carter Mayne (16 March 1928 – 24 March 2010) was an English writer of children's fiction. The Oxford Companion to Children's Literature calls him one of the outstanding children's authors of the 20th century and The Times Literary Supplement reportedly called him "the most original good writer for young people in our time". In 2004, he was convicted of child sexual abuse.

== Life ==
Mayne was born in Hull, the son of a doctor. He was educated between 1937 and 1942 at the choir school attached to Canterbury Cathedral, with Who's Who adding "then irregularly". The school was evacuated during the Second World War from Kent to Cornwall. He left school aged seventeen, but the only part of his education he valued was the five years at the choir school, which were later the foundation for his four Choir School novels.

Mayne lived for most of his life in North Yorkshire. He was lecturer in creative writing at Deakin University, in Australia, from 1976 to 1978 and then Fellow in Creative Writing at Rolle College, Exmouth, from 1979 to 1980.

== Writing career ==
Mayne's first novel, Follow the Footprints, was published in 1953. He wrote more than a hundred books, including the Choir School quartet, comprising A Swarm in May, Choristers' Cake, Cathedral Wednesday and Words and Music (1955–1963); and the Earthfasts trilogy, an unusual evocation of the King Arthur legend, comprising Earthfasts, Cradlefasts and Candlefasts (1966–2000).

For A Grass Rope he won the 1957 Carnegie Medal from the Library Association, recognising the year's best children's book by a British subject. He was also a commended runner up for the Medal five times – twice in competition with himself – for A Swarm in May (1955), Choristers' Cake (1956), Member for the Marsh (1956), Blue Boat (1957), and Ravensgill (1970). (Note: Today there are usually eight books on the Carnegie shortlist. According to CCSU, some runners up until 2002 were Commended (from 1954) or Highly Commended (from 1966), with the "High" distinction approximately annual in 1979. There were about 160 commendations of both kinds in 49 years including five for 1955, six each for 1956 and 1957 (two years Mayne was competing with himself), and three 1970 – including no high commendations.) Finally he won the 1993 Guardian Children's Fiction Prize for Low Tide, a once-in-a-lifetime book award established in 1966, judged by a panel of British children's writers.

A Swarm in May was adapted as a feature film by the Children's Film Unit in 1983 and a five-part television series of Earthfasts was broadcast by the BBC in 1994.

After 1957, Mayne wrote mostly under his own name, but he also used the names Dynely James, Charles Molin, and Martin Cobalt.

The contemporary children's author Aidan Chambers calls Mayne "notoriously little read by children and much read by adults", essentially an observer and watcher. The Guardian Children's Book Editor Julia Eccleshare calls him "one of the most highly regarded writers" and influential although "sometimes thought of as inaccessible for his young readers". He once said, "All I am doing is looking at things now and showing them to myself when young."

== Child sexual abuse charges ==
In 2004, Mayne was charged with eleven counts of indecent assaults of "young girl fans" aged between eight and sixteen. At trial one victim gave evidence of events some forty years in the past. According to The Guardian, the prosecutor said Mayne had "treated young visitors as adults". He was described in the courtroom as "the greatest living writer of children's books in English". Mayne had pleaded guilty to the charges, but his solicitor said he had done so while under huge stress and would try to clear his name. On conviction, Mayne was imprisoned for two and a half years and was placed on the sex offenders register for life. According to The Guardian, "Mayne's books were largely deliberately removed from shelves from 2004 onwards", as a result of his conviction.

== Death ==
Mayne was found dead at his home in Thornton Rust, North Yorkshire, on the morning of 24 March 2010.

== Awards ==
- 1957 Carnegie Medal, A Grass Rope
- 1993 Guardian Prize, Low Tide
- 1997 Kurt Maschler Award, or the "Emils", to Mayne and Jonathan Heale for Lady Muck, recognising integrated writing and illustration in a British children's book

== Selected works ==
- Follow the Footprints (1953)
- The World Upside Down (1954)
- A Swarm in May (1955), illus. C. Walter Hodges †
- Member for the Marsh (1956)
- Choristers' Cake (1956) †
- The Blue Boat (1957)
- A Grass Rope (Oxford, 1957), illus. Lynton Lamb
- Underground Alley (1958)
- Cathedral Wednesday (1960) †
- The Glass Ball (1961)
- The Twelve Dancers (1962)
- Sand (1962)
- Words and Music (1963) †
- Plot Night (1963)
- The Changeling (1963)
- A Parcel of Trees (1963)
- Underground Alley (1963)
- Whistling Rufus (Hamish Hamilton, 1964)
- No More School (1965)
- Pig in the Middle (1965)
- Earthfasts (1966) ‡
- Book of Heroes (1966)
- The Old Zion (1967)
- Over the Hills and Far Away (1968)
- Book of Giants (1968)
- The House on Fairmount (1968)
- The Hill Road (1969)
- Ravensgill (1970)
- A Game of Dark (1971)
- Royal Harry (1971)
- The Incline (1972)
- Skiffy (1972)
- The Pergola (1974)
- A Year and a Day (Hamilton, 1976), illus. Krystyna Turska
- It (1977)
- While the Bells Ring (1979)
- Winter Quarters (1982)
- Salt River Times (1982) illus. Elizabeth Honey
- All the King's Men (1982)
- Drift (1985)
- Kelpie (1987)
- Antar and the Eagles (Walker Books, 1985)
- Low Tide (Jonathan Cape, 1992)
- Oh Grandmama (Hamish Hamilton, 1993), illus. Maureen Bradley
- Cuddy (Red Fox, 1994)
- Bells on her Toes (OUP, 1994), illus. Maureen Bradley
- Cradlefasts (Hodder, 1995) ‡
- Pandora (Jonathan Cape, 1995), illus. Dietlind Blech
- Lady Muck (Heinemann, 1997), illus. Jonathan Heale
- Midnight Fair (Hodder, 1997)
- Candlefasts (Hodder, 2000) ‡
- The Animal Garden (2003)
- Emily Goes To Market (Jonathan Cape, 2004)
- Every Dog (2009)

† Choir School series (1955 to 1963)
‡ Earthfasts series (1966 to 2000)
