= Roger Vailland =

French novelist, essayist, and screenwriter

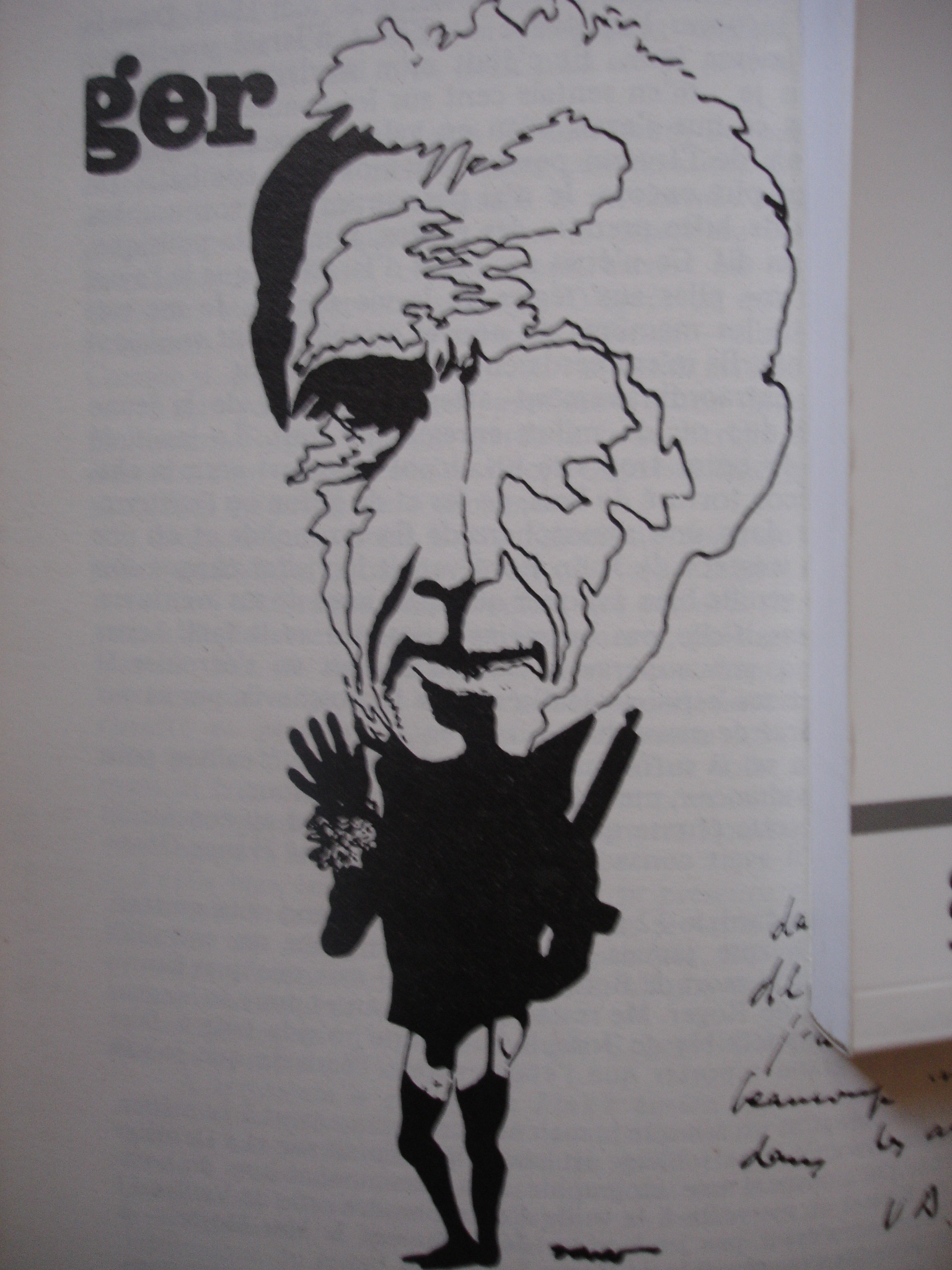
- Caricature of Roger Vailland
- Born: 16 October 1907; Acy-en-Multien, Oise
- Died: 12 May 1965 (aged 57); Meillonnas, Ain
- Occupations: Novelist; essayist; screenwriter
- Writing career
- Pen name: Georges Omer, Robert François, Etienne Merpin, Frédéric Roche
- Language: French
- Movement: Surrealism

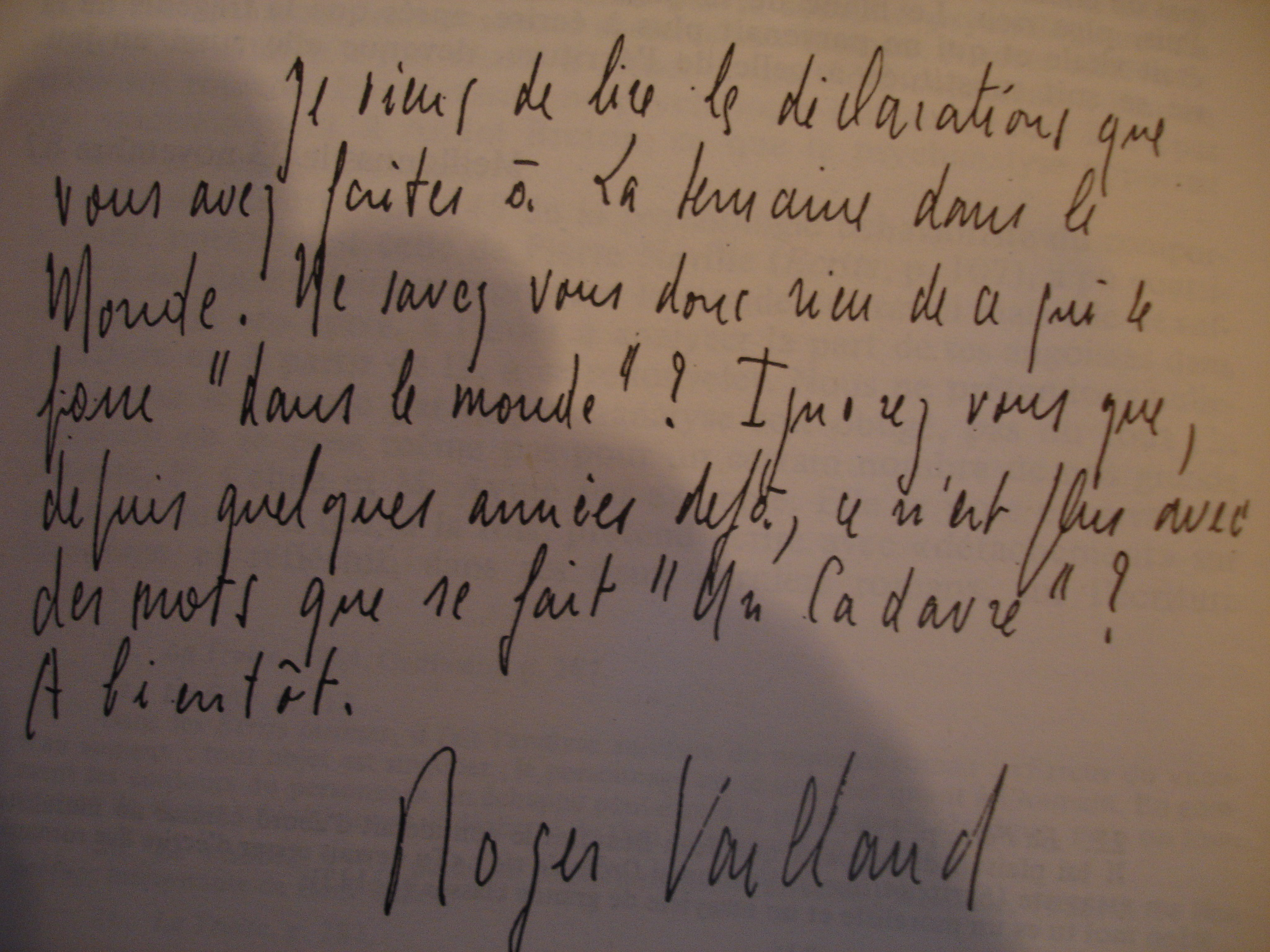
Draft of a letter to André Breton, 1948, about the Cadavre exquis, surrealist method for artist and writers (with translation).

Roger Vailland (French pronunciation: [ʁɔʒe vajɑ̃]; 16 October 1907 – 12 May 1965) was a French novelist, essayist, and screenwriter.

== Biography ==
Vailland was born in Acy-en-Multien, Oise. His novels include the prize winning Drôle de jeu (1945), Les mauvais coups (1948), Un jeune homme seul (1951), 325 000 francs (1955), and La loi (1957), winner of the Prix Goncourt. His screenplays include Les liaisons dangereuses (with Claude Brûlé and Roger Vadim, 1959) and Le vice et la vertu (with Vadim, 1962). He died, aged 57, in Meillonnas, Ain.

Vailland took part in the French Resistance during Nazi occupation. Drôle de jeu (Playing with Fire) is considered one of the finest novels about the anti-fascist Resistance. Vailland joined the French Communist Party but resigned after the Soviet suppression of the Hungarian Revolution of 1956. He remained an independent leftist for the rest of his life.

== Bibliography ==
=== Novels ===
- Drôle de jeu, Prix Interallié, Éditions Corrêa, Paris, 1945
- Les Mauvais coups, Éditions Sagittaire, 1948
- Bon pied, bon œil, Éditions Corrêa, Paris, 1950
- Un Jeune homme seul, Éditions Corrêa, Paris, 1951
- Beau masque, Éditions Gallimard, Paris, 1954
- 325 000 francs, Éditions Corrêa, Paris, 1955
- La Loi, Prix Goncourt 1957. English: The Law
- La Fête, Éditions Gallimard, Paris, 1960
- La Truite, Éditions Gallimard, Paris, 1964
- La Visirova, Messidor, Paris, 1986
- Cortès, le conquérant de l'Eldorado, Messidor, Paris, 1992

=== Travel ===
- Boroboudour, Éditions Gallimard, Paris
- Boroboudour, voyage à Bali, Java et autres îles, Éditions du Sonneur, Paris

=== Journals ===
- Chronique d’Hiroshima à Goldfinger : 1945-1965, Éditions sociales, Paris, 1984
- Chronique des années folles à la Libération, Éditions sociales, Paris, 1984.
- Écrits intimes, Éditions Gallimard, Paris, 1982.

=== Theatre ===
- Héloïse et Abélard, Editions Corréa, 1947
- Le Colonel Foster plaidera coupable, pièce en cinq actes, les Éditeurs réunis, Paris, 1952.
- Monsieur Jean, Éditions Gallimard, Paris, 1959

=== Essays ===
- Laclos, Éditions du Seuil, Paris, 1953
- Éloge du Cardinal de Bernis, Éditions Grasset, Paris, 1956.
- Expérience du drame, Éditions du Rocher, Monaco, 2002
- Un homme du peuple sous la Révolution, Éditions Gallimard, Paris, 1979
- Le regard froid : réflexions, esquisses, libelles, 1945-1962, Éditions Grasset, Paris, 1998
- N’aimer que ce qui n’a pas de prix, Éditions du Rocher, Monaco, 1995
- Les pages immortelles de Suétone, Éditions du Rocher, Monaco, 2002
- Le Saint-Empire, Éditions de la différence, Paris, 1978
- Le Surréalisme contre la révolution, Éditions Complexe, Bruxelles, 1988
