= A Better Class of Person =

1981 book

A Better Class of Person (1981) is an autobiography written by dramatist John Osborne and published in 1981. Based on Osborne's childhood and early life, it ends with the first performance of Look Back in Anger at the Royal Court Theatre in 1956. The book emphasises his warm relationship with his father Thomas, and his antagonistic relationship with his mother Nellie Beatrice, which deepened to hatred after his father died when John was young. A sequel, Almost a Gentleman, was published in 1991.

== Composition ==
After Watch It Come Down (1976), the latest of several plays of his to have a hostile reception, Osborne had no new work performed in the theatre for sixteen years. In the late 1970s, he had also been through an acrimonious divorce from his fourth wife, actress Jill Bennett. During this period his fifth wife, Helen Dawson, encouraged him to write an autobiography. A restraining order required Osborne to submit any autobiography to Bennett for her approval; the only explicit mention of her is Osborne's brief description of seeing her photograph displayed outside a London theatre as an adolescent. The first version that Osborne submitted to the publishers ended in 1959, not 1956, and contained outspoken criticism of the Royal Court Theatre management, whose solicitors asked for cuts to be made which Osborne refused; the legal stalemate was resolved when E.P. Dutton, the US publishers, suggested that on literary grounds the book should conclude before and not after the success of Look Back in Anger.

== Synopsis ==
Osborne spends his early childhood in the then working-class Fulham area of London, among his barmaid mother’s family. Like his tubercular father, a copywriter, Osborne has to spend a lot of time in hospitals and sanatoria. He represents his mother as heartless, judgmental and passive-aggressive.

In 1936, his parents move to Stoneleigh, a suburb in Surrey. Osborne falls in love with a Stoneleigh girl from a privileged background who "could be spitefully snobbish, correcting my pronunciation of words". He is lonely at the private school his father's benevolent society has paid for him to attend, but ultimately makes friends with an eccentric boy called Mickey Wall, a civil servant's son whose contempt for authority and subversive sense of humour Osborne enjoys.

Osborne and Wall take to calling themselves "the Viper Gang". As they get older, the pair enjoy arguing about politics, literature and religion. Meanwhile, Thomas’s health deteriorates. At the outbreak of WW2, the Osbornes move to the Isle of Wight, for safety and in the hope that he can convalesce. Thomas dies, and Osborne begins to hate his mother because of what he sees as her uncaring response. The death leaves Osborne and his mother destitute, but Thomas's society decides Osborne should go to a boarding school in Dorset. He gets in trouble at this school for falling in love with the headmaster's niece and is ultimately expelled.

Now a young adult and living with his mother, Osborne finds employment in trade journalism and gets to know an ebullient Canadian editor called Arnold Running who has literary aspirations and encourages Osborne's. Through getting involved in amateur dramatics, he meets a girl called Renee whose parents are eager for them to be engaged, though Osborne begins to get cold feet about marriage. Keen to get away from both the women in his life, Osborne enlists Arnold to persuade Nellie Beatrice that he should move into acting professionally; he secures a job with a touring repertory company and breaks off his engagement with Renee by post.

An older actress called Stella Linden joins the cast and Osborne is smitten by her. She offers him help with his writing, and eventually they become lovers. After the tour ends, he spends a period in Brighton as a kept man, working on a play with Stella, but Osborne finds her insistence on conventional subject-matter and playwriting technique constricting, and the pair drift apart. She gets a job in Kendal and Osborne has to leave the flat they have lived in rent-free.

Unwilling to live with Nellie Beatrice, he joins an acting troupe in Ilfracombe and gets to know an actor called Anthony Creighton whose unrequited crush on him Osborne tolerates. The company does several provincial tours before disbanding. While acting in Somerset, Osborne falls in love with a local actress, and they marry despite her prosperous parents' disapproval of him. At first the young couple are happy, but work drives them apart as her career thrives while his does not.

He moves in with Creighton and they collaborate on several unsuccessful plays. Creighton's mother dies, leaving a small inheritance, and Osborne persuades him to buy a river barge where they can live cheaply. He writes Look Back in Anger, based on his troubled marriage, and submits it to various agents. He is living on the Thames with Creighton when George Devine, artistic director of the English Stage Company, accepts the play and rows out to the houseboat to meet him.

At both the book's opening and its close, Osborne mentions that the premiere of Look Back in Anger in 1956 took place on his beloved father’s birthday, the 8th of May. Throughout the autobiography, he presents passages from his works in parallel with real-life events that inspired them: as playwright Alan Bennett says in an early review, through this technique Osborne is open about having used his life as literary material.

== Reception ==
John Lahr in The New York Times represented the book as a return to form: "the best piece of writing Osborne has done since Inadmissible Evidence... A Better Class of Person takes its energy from looking backward to the source of his pain before fame softened him. In this first installment of his autobiography, Osborne rediscovers the daring and cheek which distinguished his early, good work." Alan Bennett, assessing the work for the London Review of Books, echoed Lahr's words: "It is immensely enjoyable, is written with great gusto and Osborne has had better notices for it than for any of his plays since Inadmissible Evidence." Michael Ratcliffe in The Times took a similar line: "the best thing John Osborne has written since West of Suez (1971)". Reviewing its sequel, Almost a Gentleman, in 1991, Hilary Mantel wrote, "A Better Class of Person is written with the tautness and power of a well-organised novel. It is... remarkable for its account of the lower-middle-class childhood on the fringes of London, and for its vengeful portrait of a mother who had 'eyes that missed nothing and understood nothing'."

Several commentators have stated that Osborne's reputation is likely to rest on his two autobiographies no less than his plays. Both Bennett and Ratcliffe make a comparison with Charles Dickens: "Osborne... seems to have had a childhood of Dickensian richness and oddity"; "Attempting matricide [in his portrayal of Nellie Beatrice], Osborne instead made a creature of whom Dickens would have been proud." The theatre historian Phyllis Hartnoll was cool in her appraisal of Osborne's plays and their influence, but in the 1993 edition of her reference work The Oxford Companion to the Theatre she added A Better Class of Person to a list of recommended reading; its later chapters provide a vivid picture of 1940s and 1950s provincial repertory theatre. As Osborne announces in the book, Nellie Beatrice was still alive when it was published ("My grandmother lived to be 103 and my own mother seems appropriately hell bent on a similar score"), but it is unknown whether she read it: by the time it was published, the two had long since stopped speaking.

== Accuracy ==
As well as raising the issue of how fair the book is to Nellie Beatrice (and later commentators such as Blake Morrison would conclude that it is unfair), Bennett notes how vague the author often is with dates (including his own birthdate) and comments, "Osborne... had a bleak childhood (or would like us to think so)." One of Osborne's statements, that he was expelled from school for hitting the headmaster, was later contradicted by a fellow pupil. (Note: Osborne's claim has been repeated uncritically by several sources.) In places the book contradicts itself: for example, Osborne claims that the reason for his Great Uncle Frank's shameful and sudden emigration to Canada was never spoken of within the family, then in the next chapter says that this was known to be embezzlement. Osborne refers somewhat dismissively to the gay Creighton's attraction to him: "he was one of those luckless homosexuals, like J. R. Ackerley, who only fall in love with heterosexuals. I was quite fond of him, but his frequent references to 'the rough kiss of male Hamlets' made me eager for him to find some young actor who would command his whole attention". After Osborne's death, Creighton produced letters from him that suggested their relationship had been more intimate, though Osborne's family contested this.

== Dramatic version ==
The autobiography was preceded by a screenplay entitled Too Young to Fight, Too Old to Forget, which was broadcast by Thames TV on 13 July 1985 under the title A Better Class of Person. It was directed by Frank Cvitanovich, with Eileen Atkins and Alan Howard as Osborne's parents and Gary Capelin and Neil McPherson as Osborne.

== Bibliography ==
- Hartnoll, Phyllis (1993). The Concise Oxford Companion to the Theatre. Oxford: Oxford University Press. ISBN 978-0-192-82574-2.
- Heilpern, John (2006). John Osborne: A Patriot for Us. London: Chatto & Windus. ISBN 978-0-7011-6780-6.
- Osborne, John (1981). A Better Class of Person: An Autobiography, 1929–56 (hardback ed.). Faber and Faber. ISBN 0-571-11785-6.
