= Look Back in Anger (disambiguation) =

Look Back in Anger is a 1956 play by John Osborne.

Look Back in Anger may also refer to:

- Look Back in Anger (1959 film), directed by Tony Richardson
- Look Back in Anger (1980 film), directed by Lindsay Anderson
- Look Back in Anger (1989 film), a British videotaped television production directed by Judi Dench
- Look Back in Anger (TV series), a 2000 South Korean KBS television drama
- "Look Back in Anger" (EastEnders), a 2015 episode of EastEnders
- "Look Back in Anger" (song), a 1979 song written by David Bowie and Brian Eno

== See also ==
- Looking Back in Anger, a 1989 Chinese TV series.
- "Don't Look Back in Anger", a 1995 song by the British rock band Oasis
