= Under Plain Cover =

Play by John Osborne

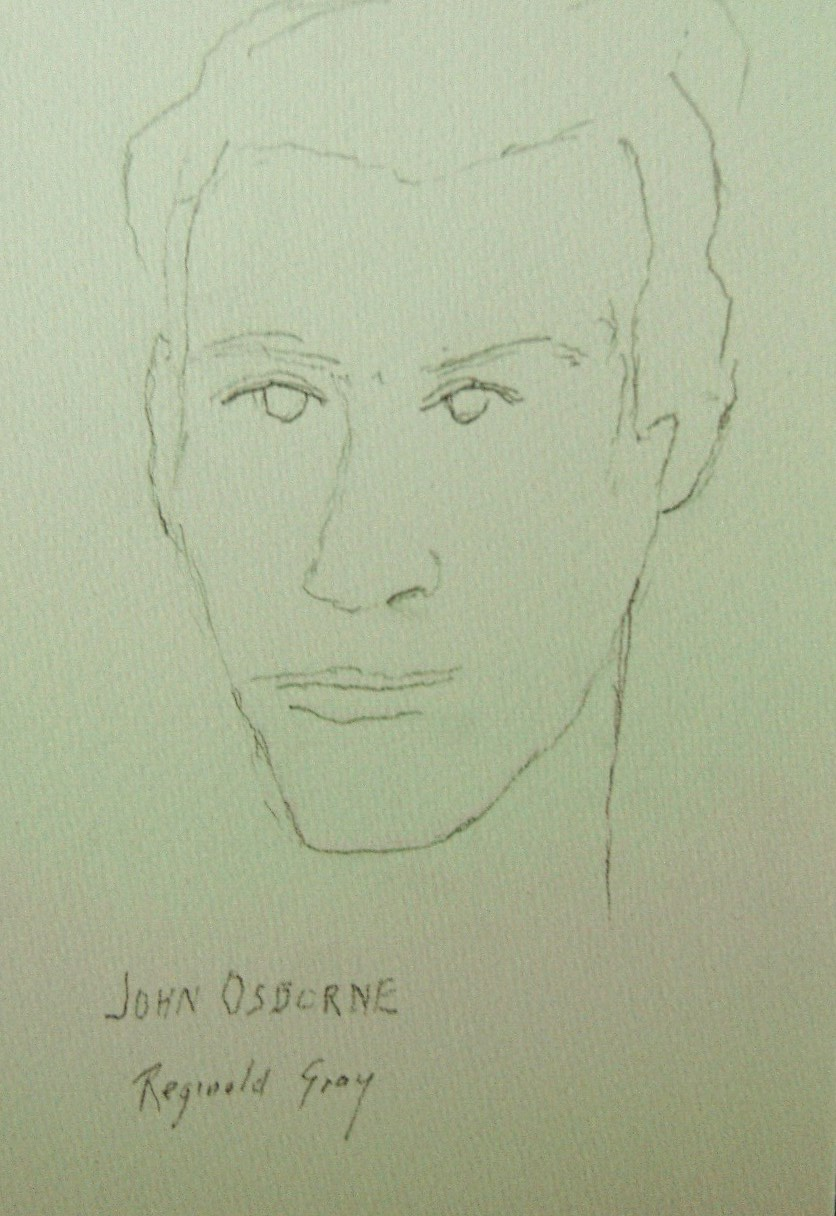
- Portrait of Osborne by Reginald Gray
- Original language: English
- Written by: John Osborne
- Subject: A young couple enjoy erotic role playing
- Genre: satire

Premiere
- Date: 19 June 1962
- Place: Royal Court Theatre

Under Plain Cover (1962) is a short two-act play by John Osborne, published in his book "Plays for England". It was designed to be shown in a double-bill with another short play, The Blood of the Bambergs. The play is a satirical commentary on sexual hypocrisy. It was the first play directed by Jonathan Miller.

== Background ==
Sexually explicit content was still not acceptable on the English stage. The Lord Chamberlain's office, which could effectively censor plays by denying them a license to perform, called it "effluent". The report's author, Norman Gwatkin, stated that "I'm sure some people will swoon with delight at this latest Osborne effluent". Osborne's biographer John Heilpern says that it's a "miracle that the play passed the censor", but quotes Gwatkin saying that "the morals of anyone who pretends to understand what the play is all about will already be beyond contamination; and the remainder will ride the storm unsullied."

== Plot ==
A journalist shows an interest in a couple called Tim and Jenny, who appear to be normal suburban dwellers, with two young children. But it seems that they enjoy fetishistic dressing-up games, in which the couple plays a doctor and nurse; a mail-order bride and her husband-to-be; and other characters. Later the journalist discovers that, unknown to themselves, the couple are in fact a brother and sister. Once the story reaches the press it creates a sensation. The couple separate, and the woman remarries, but her marriage is unhappy. Eventually they get back together, all of their personal dramas being followed and partly created by the tabloid press. Disgusted with himself for nearly destroying the lives of a harmless happy couple, the journalist drinks himself insensible.

== Reception ==
The play was much better received than The Blood of the Bambergs. It was taken seriously by Kenneth Tynan, as an exploration of privacy, public morality and the intrusion of the press. Harold Hobson considered that it brought Jean Genet's theatre of sexual radicalism to England. Heilpern says that the sexual politics is far less radical than plays such as Genet's The Balcony: "it's basically a prolonged panegyric to women's underwear. There are some forty five references to the elaborate merits of knicker, panty, bloomer, brief, Directoire, gusset and thread, quality interlock, elastic or open top, schoolgirl blue, camiknicker and cornet du bal."
