= Christopher Whelen =

English composer, conductor and playwright

Christopher Whelen (17 April 1927 – 18 September 1993) was an English composer, conductor and playwright, best known for his radio and television operas. Because much of his work was written for specific theatre productions in the 1950s, or directly for broadcast in the 1960s to the 1980s, little of it survives today, though a number of his scores and related papers have been deposited in the British Library.

== Life ==
Whelen was born in London into a musical family. He became a chorister at New College, Oxford, attended Worksop College (studying piano and 'cello) and then at the Birmingham and Midland School of Music (now the Royal Birmingham Conservatoire) between 1944 and 1946 (studying clarinet and composition). After two years National Service in the RAF he secured conducting lessons with the Austrian émigré Rudolf Schwarz, newly appointed to the Bournemouth Municipal Orchestra, subsequently becoming his Assistant Conductor.

Already interested in Celtic culture (particularly Yeats), the music of Arnold Bax became a central influence for Whelen after hearing a performance of Tintagel. A correspondence began in 1947, which led to a close friendship until Bax's death in 1953. It was at Bax's request that in 1951 Whelen conducted Bax's Sixth Symphony in Bournemouth.

Given the non-availability of conducting posts at the time and needing to earn a living, Whelen moved to London, whilst continuing for a time to guest conduct in Birmingham, Liverpool, Bournemouth and Dublin. He subsequently became Director of Music for The Old Vic Theatre company, then engaged in producing a complete cycle of Shakespeare's plays. This led to his being asked to write incidental music for them. Commissions followed from other theatres and from the BBC.

Whelen briefly ventured into the field of musicals, culminating in writing the music for John Osborne's The World of Paul Slickey (1959). This was Osborne's only attempt at writing a musical, but after the huge successes of his previous plays Look Back in Anger and The Entertainer, the play was to become "one of the most spectacular disasters in English theatre". Despite this setback, a series of commissions by the BBC followed for Whelen from the 1960s into the 1980s, including two operas specially conceived for television, as well as a series of hard to classify musico-dramatic works for which he wrote both words and music, fusing the music and action closely together.

Whelen met his lifelong partner Dennis Andrews in 1948 in Bournemouth. They lived together for many years in London and Cumnor, Oxfordshire, before Whelen's death in 1993. The Christopher Whelen Award for innovation in radio, TV and the theatre was set up in his name. Winners have included Paddy Cuneen, Jonathan Dove, Orlando Gough and Mick Sands.

== Music ==
Whelen was primarily a music dramatist and his most successful works are the series of radio and television music theatre works commissioned by the BBC starting from the late 1950s with composing The Diary of Samuel Pepys. His first operatic production, broadcast on 6 August 1961, was The Beggar's Opera, for which he contributed new arrangements of the traditional ballads. The original radio opera The Cancelling Dark, with text by the poet Vernon Scannell, followed on 5 December 1965. Based on a true story, the action alternates between a crashed aircraft in the African jungle near Benguela and the radio control room at Kakonda Airfield.

In 1966 the BBC announced "our intention to win wider audiences for opera" and a wide-ranging season was programmed by Cedric Messina (Director of Opera - Drama Group). John Hopkins and Whelen were jointly commissioned to create a work for BBC2 that would explore what a TV opera might look like, featuring "a contemporary plot and modern dress". The first was Some Place of Darkness, described by Jennifer Barnes as " a sombre domestic drama set in the present, it exemplified all that television promoted". The second opera, Night Cry, although completed and scheduled for production in 1968, was shelved, following a change in the Directorship of BBC2.

By 1969, for Incident at Owl Creek, Whelen had dispensed with a librettist, adapting the source material (based on the short story by Ambrose Bierce) himself. His next piece, The Findings (1972) had a text based on an original idea concerning the excavation of an Etruscan tomb. Creating his own plot and characters presented through his own words and music, Whelen was attempting to create a more personal form of "total musical theatre". Christopher Palmer identified The Findings and Incident at Owl Creek as "outstanding".

The music drama The Restorer, produced and directed by Martin Esslin, is a further example of Whelen's experimentation with the close combination of words and music. The plot involves the discovery of a mysterious Dutch painting, prompting a journey of self-exploration.

Another strand of Whelen's work was in film. He composed the score for The Valiant (1962), The Face of Fu Manchu (1965) and Coast of Skeletons (1965). There was also a ballet, Cul de Sac, choreographed by Norman Morrice and staged by Ballet Rambert on 13 July 1964 at Sadler's Wells.

Whelen wrote incidental music for over a hundred plays in all, including some twenty-nine for Shakespeare productions at the Old Vic, Stratford-on-Avon and Chichester Festival Theatres - and for BBC radio and television - as well as major scores, involving both choruses and orchestras for a series of seven Greek Dramas on the BBC's Third Programme.

== Works ==
=== Television and radio operas ===
- The Cancelling Dark, radio opera, libretto by Vernon Scannell (1964)
- Some Place of Darkness, television opera, libretto by John Hopkins (1967)
- Incident at Owl Creek, radio opera, libretto Whelen after Ambrose Bierce (1969)
- The Findings, radio opera, libretto Whelen (1972)

=== Radio drama, words and music by Whelen ===
- The Restorer (1976)
- Bridges, a play with music written for stereo (1976)
- To the Office and Back, notes towards a portrait of Wallace Stevens (1978)
- Cumulus, a weather fantasy (1980)
- The Jigsaw Must Fit, 'musico-dramatic' work (1983)
- Ed e Subito Sera, a portrait of Salvatore Quasimodo (1984)
- Broad Daylight, a love story in words and music (1986)

=== Musical comedies ===
- School (1957) (adapted from T W Robertson). Birmingham Repertory Theatre / Palace Theatre London
- Ferdinand, the Matador (1958) (Book and lyrics by Leo Lehmann). The opening production of the newly built Belgrade Theatre, Coventry
- Who is Hopkin? (1960) Commissioned by R.A.D.A.
- Walker London (1962). Birmingham Repertory Theatre.
- The World of Paul Slickey (1959). (Book and Lyrics by John Osborne - who also directed.)

=== Incidental music ===
- Murder in the Cathedral by T. S. Eliot (1953, Old Vic Company, recording available)
- The Lord of the Flies by William Golding, dramatised by Archie Campbell (1955)
- The Green Pastures by Marc Connelly (1956), incidental music and musical direction. The spirituals were arranged and conducted by Avril Coleridge-Taylor.
- Arlecchino, by Goldoni (1957) Lyric Hammersmith / Edinburgh
- Pincher Martin by William Golding, dramatised by Archie Campbell (1958)
- Campion (1959 BBC Television mystery series)
- An Age of Kings: Pageant of English History, cycle of Shakespeare history plays (from 1960) (BBC DVD available)
- The Changeling by Thomas Middleton (1960)
- The Lincoln Passion (1963)
- The King Must Die by Mary Renault (1963)
- The Spread of the Eagle, cycle of Shakespeare's 3 Roman plays (1963) BBC TV
- A Christmas Carol by Charles Dickens (1965)
- The Bull From the Sea by Mary Renault (1965)
- The Old Glory, trilogy by Robert Lowell (1969)
- Vivat Rex, a dramatic chronicle of the English crown in 26 episodes, narrated by Richard Burton (1977) (BBC recording available)

=== Song Cycles ===
- A Narrow Bed (Poems by Peter Porter) for Baritone and mixed ensemble (1964). First performed by John Shirley-Quirk (A.T.V./Tempo)
- A Disturbance in Mirrors (Poems by Sylvia Plath) for Soprano and Brass Quintet (1964). First performed by Marjorie Thomas and the Philip Jones Brass Quintet (BBC Radio 3)

=== Choral (a capella) ===
- Pompeii for mixed voices (Words by Peter Porter, based on Pompeian Graffiti).

=== Orchestral ===
- Conversazione. (Dedicated to Rudolf Schwarz) (1964). (Score in Bournemouth Symphony Orchestral Library).
- Cul de Sac, ballet score, first performed by Ballet Rambert at the Sadler's Wells Theatre, 1964, Norman Morrice (choreographer), Ralph Koltai (designer).

=== Piano ===
- Theme and Variations (1946). Written in memory of Whelen's German cousin, killed in the war, the seven variations unusually precede the theme which is then followed by a brief epilogue.
- Piano Sonata (1963). In three movements, first performed by Margaret Gibbs at Wigmore Hall, 10.02.1964.
- Adagio (for left hand) (was written for a personal friend, the Swedish Nobel-Prize winning poet, Tomas Tranströmer.

=== Writings ===
- A.I.Bacharach - Music Masters Vol.4. Chapter on Sir Arnold Bax. (1954). Cassel/Penguin.
- 'Thoughts on Television Opera', in Composer 24 (1967), p 17
- The Composer as Dramatist, BBC Radio 3 talk, broadcast 16 July 1972
- Cuchulan Among the Guns: Sir Arnold Bax's Letters to Christopher Whelen, together with the Latter's Writings and Broadcasts on Bax and His Music, edited by Dennis Andrews (2000)

=== Further reading/listening ===
- As the Case Requires (a commemorative memorial tribute to Christopher Whelen), Libanus Press, Marlborough, 1994, 110 copies printed
- The Far Theatricals of Day, by Jonathon Dove (Poems by Emily Dickinson) for 4 soloists, choir, brass quintet and organ, commissioned and composed in memory of Christopher Whelen. First performed in Canterbury Cathedral and St Brides Church London, under the auspices of J.A.M. (Peters Edition) (Available on CD)
- Whelen's scores, libretti, privately recorded CDs, etc are held in the British Library (MS Mus 1798).
