= Epitaph for George Dillon =

- Poster for original Broadway production
- Original language: English
- Written by: John Osborne and Anthony Creighton
- Setting: The Elliot family home, just outside London. The present.

Premiere
- Date: 1957
- Place: Oxford Experimental Theatre, Oxford University

Epitaph for George Dillon is an early John Osborne play, one of two he wrote in collaboration with Anthony Creighton (the other is Personal Enemy). It was written before Look Back in Anger, the play which made Osborne's career, but opened a year after at Oxford Experimental Theatre in 1957, and was then produced at London's Royal Court theatre, where Look Back in Anger had debuted. It transferred to New York City shortly afterwards and garnered three Tony Award nominations.

== Themes ==
The play tells the story of Kate Elliot's unhappy suburban South London family and the domestic havoc wrought when she decides to adopt George Dillon as a surrogate son.

It tackles typical Osborne themes, including religion (and Osborne's hatred thereof), vegetarianism, the casual deception of everyday life and scorn of the theatre. In common with Jimmy Porter in Look Back in Anger, George Dillon is an intelligent man unable to find his place in the world.

== London ==
It opened professionally at the Royal Court Theatre on 11 February 1958, in a production by William Gaskill, with the following cast (in order of appearance):

- Wendy Craig ... Josie Elliot
- Yvonne Mitchell ... Ruth Gray
- Alison Leggatt ... Mrs. Elliot
- Avril Elgar ... Norah Elliot
- Toke Townley ... Percy Elliot
- Robert Stephens ... George Dillon
- Philip Locke ... Geoffrey Colwyn-Stuart
- Paul Bailey ... Mr Webb
- Nigel Davenport ... Barney Evans

Critical reception

In The Observer, Kenneth Tynan called it "Powerful, honest and transfixing"; while in The Sunday Times, Harold Hobson wrote that the play "absorbs and fascinates because it is that rarest of theatrical phenomena, a realistic modern drama which is not bourgeois in its underlying assumptions. It is like a familiar building caught at an angle which suddenly makes it look like something never seen before."

== Broadway ==
It made its debut on Broadway on 4 November 1958 starring Wendy Craig but was a failure and closed on 22 November 1958 after just 23 performances. Another version by new management and separately-financed opened during the same season on 12 January 1959, again starring Craig but was also a commercial failure playing for 48 performances, and closing on 21 February 1959. The first version received three Tony Award nominations - Best play; best direction (William Gaskill) and best actor (Robert Stephens).

Original Broadway cast

- Wendy Craig ... Josie Elliot
- Felix Deebank ... Barney Evans
- Avril Elgar ... Norah Elliot
- Frank Finlay ... Percy Elliot
- Eileen Herlie ... Ruth Gray
- Alison Leggatt ... Mrs. Elliot
- Robert Stephens ... George Dillon
- James Valentine... Geoffrey Colwyn-Stuart
- David Vaughan ... Mr Webb

== 2005 London revival ==
A successful West End revival of the play ran at the Comedy Theatre from 27 September 2005 until 14 January 2006, directed by Peter Gill and starring Joseph Fiennes, Francesca Annis and Anne Reid.

It also featured Geoffrey Hutchings, Zoe Tapper, Dorothy Atkinson, Stephen Greif, Hugh Simon and Alex Dunbar.

== Adaptations ==
In 1969, BBC Radio broadcast a production starring John Hurt in the title role; and in 1994, another version starring Michael Maloney.

== Awards and nominations ==
=== Original Broadway production ===
Year	Award	Category	Nominee	Result
1959	Tony Award	Best Play		Nominated
1959	Tony Award	Best Actor in a Play	Robert Stephens	Nominated
1959	Tony Award	Best Director	William Gaskill	Nominated

=== 2005 West End revival ===
Year	Award	Category	Nominee	Result
2006	Laurence Olivier Award	Best Performance in a Supporting Role	Anne Reid	Nominated

== Online Reviews ==
- Guardian
- The Stage
- CurtainUp
- The British Theatre Guide
- Variety
- Anni Bruno
