= Stella Linden =

British actress (1919–2005)

Stella Linden (born Stella Maris Marsden on 5 June 1919 - 23 January 2005) was an actress, stage director, author and script/screenwriter, best known for mentoring playwright John Osborne and for writing the film Two a Penny. She was the wife of actor-manager Terence Edward Duff, better known by his stage name Patrick Desmond, who had been running his own touring and repertory companies since 1929 at the age of 21. She died in 2005 in New Mexico.

== Childhood ==
Stella was born to Ruby Mary Wimbush and Charles W Marsden in 1919. Her mother shared ownership of the Wimbush chain of confectionery shops in Birmingham with other members of the family. Stella was particularly close to her aunt, Olive Wimbush, and her uncle, Albert "Bert" Wimbush, both of whom co-owned the confectionery chain with her mother Ruby. In 1923, Stella's mother remarried to Benjamin L Ingham and shortly after gave birth to a boy whom she named Ambrose after her father (Stella's grandfather) Ambrose Durrant Wimbush.

== Career in England ==
Stella married Thomas Coulthard in December 1939. Their son John Christopher was born in September 1940 and died three months later. She and Thomas parted and Stella decided to go on the stage, taking the stage name Stella Linden.

Her first known appearance on-stage was in April 1944 in the play Lilies of the Field presented by the Swindon Repertory Company at the Civic Playhouse, Swindon under the direction of Anthony Hawtree and Yvonne le Dair.

In 1945, she appeared in a short film for TV called 'Here We Come Gathering: A Story of the Kentish Orchards' playing the schoolmistress. She had joined the Sage Repertory Group—Anthony Creighton's provincial touring company. She also met Patrick Desmond that year when he engaged her to appear in his summer tour of the play Laura, and the two were married in July 1948 at the Paddington Registrar's Office, London. Stella's mother, who by then used the name Ruby Ingham, and Stella's half-brother Ambrose Ingham, were the only witnesses to the marriage.

Following the 1945 summer tour of Laura, Stella appeared in The Quiet Weekend for a short autumn tour under the direction of Richard Bird. She then joined the P.W. Spellman Company at the Alexandra Theatre, Stoke Newington in January 1946 appearing in a series of plays. In March 1947, she joined the Byron-Thompson Players at the Lyceum Theatre, Crewe and appeared in Petticoat Influence.

In early 1947, Stella and Patrick Desmond formed the London Players' Guild, the object being to give understudies and small-part actors the opportunity to appear in plays which were to be presented on Sundays. Stella was honorary secretary. Also in 1947, she and Wilfred Stephens (Patrick Desmond's partner in a theatrical agency) applied for a licence to carry on an employment agency for the acting profession (a theatrical agency). This agency would operate from the same premises as Patrick Desmond's agency.

Stella met John Osborne in January 1948 when he was engaged as assistant stage manager for the tour of No Room at the Inn in which she was appearing.

When Osborne told Desmond he was trying to write his first play, he referred Osborne to Stella, unaware that Osborne and Stella were lovers at the time. Stella helped him structure and lighten the tone of The Devil Inside Him, and Osborne gave her co-author credits. By May 1950, the play was finished, and Stella appeared in and directed it at the Theatre Royal in Huddersfield. The only surviving copy of the play was found in 2008 in Lord Chamberlain's Office (to where it had been sent for censorship), along with Personal Enemy—another play Osborne wrote in collaboration, this time with Anthony Creighton. Both plays are now housed at the British Library.

Earlier in 1950, Stella and her husband, Patrick Desmond took out a tour of Rain by Somerset Maugham, Stella playing the vamp Sadie Thompson. John Osborne was an assistant stage manager and George Dillon played the Captain. John Osborne was to use this name later in his play, Epitaph for George Dillon, which he co-wrote with Anthony Creighton. This was followed by working with her husband, Patrick Desmond, acting and directing for his companies in Brighton and Huddersfield. Her final stage engagement before leaving for America was to direct Claude Hulbert and Enid Trevor in the comedy For The Love of Mike at the Pavilion Theatre, Torquay in March 1951.

== Career in America ==
She left her husband to seek fame in Hollywood, sailing on the liner 'De Grasse' and arriving in New York on 16 May 1951. She returned to Europe briefly, sailing from New York to Rotterdam in December 1951 and arriving back in New York on 3 March 1952, sailing on the 'Ryndam'.

In the summer of 1951 she appeared as a hotel clerk in an episode of the TV show Foreign Intrigue titled "At the Airport" and sometime later was said to have had steady jobs as a gameshow hostess and as a model. Unable to find work, she went to Mexico, writing in a letter to Desmond that she was there to get a 'quickie' divorce.

In May 1954 Stella married Rupert Marius Texel. They divorced in April 1971.

Paramount released the film Wild is the Wind in December 1957. It featured uncredited screenplay contributions by Dalton Trumbo, Philip Yordan, Eugene Daniell and Stella Linden (credited as Anna Sten). Dalton Trumbo was said to be in Mexico during this period.

In 1965, Stella contributed the teleplays for two episodes of the TV series The Count of Monte Cristo. The first was 'The Luxembourg Affair' and the other was 'A Toy for the Infanta'. (IMDb).

In 1967, she wrote an episode of The Monkees titled "A Coffin Too Frequent" and a book titled Two a Penny. "A Coffin Too Frequent" aired on 20 November and Two a Penny was adapted to film that same year. Linden co-wrote the screenplay for Two a Penny with David Winters, who went uncredited.

The Los Angeles Times 15 Jan 1968 announced a multi-million dollar program of films to be produced by CKF Productions, Inc. for release by United Artists and supervised by Jerry Bressler. Films included 'Pussycat, Pussycat, I Love You' and 'A Grave Undertaking', the latter a story by Stella M. Linden. Only the former, starring Ian McShane and Anna Calder-Marshall, saw the light of day, being released in March 1970.

In 1970-71 Stella is reported to have been living with a man called Jim in Malibu Canyon, California. (Ref: Correspondence on Rootsweb with Jim's sister.)

A report in the Taos News from 30 Sept 1976 promoted a spinning and dyeing workshop conducted by Stella Texel, a native of England. She had spent the summer at Kristina Wilson's Song of the Wind weaving school at Arroyo Hondo, New Mexico. Described as a fiber artist, she would demonstrate the use of a drop-spindle and dyeing techniques. Further reports in the Taos News, El Paso Times and Santa Fe New Mexican showed Stella Texel holding spinning and dyeing workshops in the area. The Albuquerque Journal 31 July 1995 reported that Stella Texel, 76, closed on a loan of about $5,000 from the New Mexico Community Development Loan Fund using a spinning wheel, two looms, four beehives, an anvil and a forge as collateral. She is described as a blacksmith near the small town of Regina, north of Cuba, New Mexico.

In 1990-92 she was known to be residing in Cuba, New Mexico. She died in Bernalillo County, Albuquerque, New Mexico on 23 January 2005.

Little more is known or on record of her career in the USA. Stella had been in the country 54 years, yet the paucity of her work leads one to wonder exactly what she did during this time. There are large gaps between the few jobs on record, so what did she live on? Her sojourn in the Taos area giving spinning and dyeing courses have yet to be confirmed. She is not mentioned in the book 'Remarkable Women of Taos', edited by Elizabeth Cunningham.

It is possible Stella wrote the novel titled Shameless (Simon & Schuster 1989), which tells the fictional autobiography of a girl named Honey. The blurb describes the author as an actress, model and gameshow hostess. However, there is no actual evidence the Stella Linden previously known as Stella Marsden authored this book and no gameshow has been found that she is thought to have hosted.
