= The Hurst =

House in Shropshire, England

Coordinates: 52°25′13″N 3°00′25″W

The Hurst is a house in Clunton, Shropshire. It was the residence of the writer John Osborne and his wife, the journalist and critic Helen Osborne from 1985 until their respective deaths in 1994 and 2004. It is now The John Osborne Arvon Centre run by the Arvon Foundation.

It has been listed Grade II on the National Heritage List for England (NHLE) since June 1985. The official NHLE listing describes the house as a "pleasing minor gentleman's residence" and believes its construction to be closer to 1835 rather than the 1813 listed on documents.

Helen Osborne was left with debts of £337,000 following her husband's death in 1994. The Harry Ransom Center in Texas acquired the Osborne's scripts, journals and business papers for $200,000 and the Hurst was bought by the Arvon Foundation in 1998 through the initiative of Grey Gowrie, former arts minister, and a friend of the Osbornes. The foundation run residential study centres for creative writers and the house underwent a £2.3 million renovation with funds from the National Lottery Heritage Fund. It was opened as The John Osborne Arvon Centre on 28 March 2003 by Gowrie and the actress Maggie Smith. The Poet Laureate, Andrew Motion, spoke to students at the house in 2003. Helen Osborne lived at the house until her death in 2004.

The house is set in 30 acres of woodland with a garden, kitchen garden and lake.
