= Déjàvu =

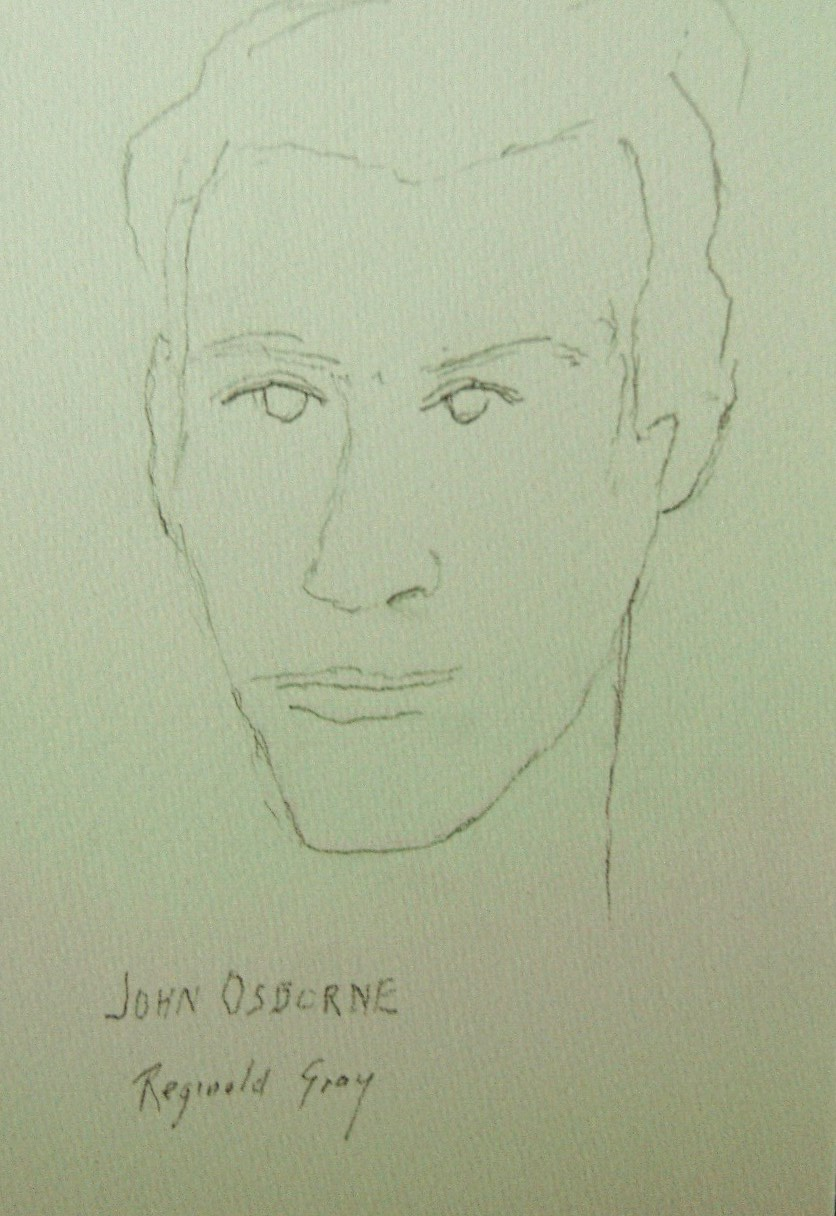
- Portrait of Osborne by Reginald Gray
- Original language: English
- Written by: John Osborne
- Subject: A middle-aged man rants about modern life
- Genre: social realism

Premiere
- Date: 8 May 1992
- Place: Thorndike Theatre

Déjàvu is a stage play by John Osborne performed in 1992. It was Osborne's final work for the theatre, the failure of which on the stage made him decide to give up play-writing. The play is a sequel to Osborne's first successful play, Look Back in Anger (1956); it portrays the life and thoughts of the central character from the earlier play, Jimmy Porter (referred to as J.P.), in middle age.

== Creation ==
Osborne had been thinking about a sequel to Look Back in Anger for some years, and had been working on a draft of the play since 1987 when he started jotting down ideas and plotting it out. The play itself was written over several months in from December 1988 to April 1989. He tried out several titles, but decided on Déjàvu, "deliberately misspelt", according to John Heilpern, as a single word (rather than the correct "Déjà vu").

== Production difficulties ==
The play was sent to Richard Eyre at the Royal National Theatre who rejected it, suggesting that it would work best as a "monologue performed prior to a performance of LOOK BACK IN ANGER". Tony Richardson, the original director of Look Back in Anger, was enthusiastic, but it was again turned down by Max Stafford-Clark at the Royal Court Theatre. Several readers took the view that it was much too long, and so should be cut. Stephen Daldry thought that Osborne would have been better advised to do a one-man show, performing Porter's rants in the play himself. Osborne approached various actors and directors but was unable to develop the production, at one point writing a bitter letter to The Times about his problems. Peter O'Toole agreed to play the main role, but dropped out after conflicts with Osborne over proposed cuts to the script. John Standing also dropped out after an argument with Osborne. Eventually Peter Egan took the role of Porter, and the play was produced in May 1992 at the Thorndike Theatre directed by Tony Palmer.

The play was not a commercial success, closing after a run of seven weeks. Egan later wrote, "I knew the play wouldn't work but I couldn't turn it down. I knew John deserved to be presented again – and that it would be his last work...The play was a commercial failure but it reawakened people to the great energy and power of Osborne." The failure of the play distressed Osborne who thereafter signed himself "John Osborne, ex-playwright".

The play was revived at the Comedy Theatre, Panton Street, around 1993 but closed after some weeks. Peter O'Toole and Hayley Mills were there, among many others. O'Toole walked out shouting, "Oi've never heard such f...…. rubbish!"

== Original cast ==
- Peter Egan as J.P.
- Gareth Thomas as Cliff
- Alison Johnston as Alison Porter, J.P.'s daughter
- Eve Matheson as Helena

== Plot ==
Jimmy Porter (J.P.) is living with his daughter Alison, who begins the play ironing, just as her mother, also Alison, did in Look Back in Anger. J.P. and Alison argue relentlessly, as she expresses her contempt for her own misanthropic father. Jimmy's old friend Cliff tries to smooth things over, while Alison's friend Helena attempts to support her. J.P. takes consolation in his teddy bear as he objects to the vulgarisation of the English language and the corrupting influences of various social agencies. In the end, Alison walks out on her father.

== Critical reception ==
Osborne and Palmer both argued that Jimmy Porter (J.P.) is essentially a "comedy character" comparable to Falstaff, whose self-aggrandising rants are not to be taken too seriously. Osborne wrote that J.P. "generates energy, but, also, like, say, Malvolio or Falstaff, an inescapable melancholy". Palmer also argued that "J.P. has a life-enhancing Falstaffian quality; he [Falstaff] was a coward, a braggart, a liar, totally unscrupulous, a drunk, with an inheritance, like J.P. And just like Falstaff, J.P. can stop the play dead in its tracks and say 'what is honour'".

The play's original reviews were mixed. The Independent noted that Jimmy's rants in the original play were exhilarating because they were transgressive, but the "ageing J.P. merely proves that, in less shockable times, the unspeakable is all too easily spoken". Several critics complained that the play was essentially a vehicle for J.P.'s pontifications, being as, as The Sunday Times put it, "essentially one long speech". Sheridan Morley called it "a monologue without a play".

Sheila Stowell, in an essay on Déjàvu, comments that the play is not a "sequel" in the traditional Hollywood sense of an attempt to cash-in on an earlier success; rather it is an attempt to "blow up" the rebellious image of Look Back’s Jimmy Porter. She disputes the comparison to Falstaff because J.P.'s antagonists are all "sham characters", easily outwitted by the hero, unlike Shakespeare's play in which Falstaff's bluster is exposed for what it is. However, she argues that J.P.'s social criticisms are largely consistent with the anarchic attitudes of the 1956 Jimmy.
