= The World of Paul Slickey =

1959 musical by John Osborne

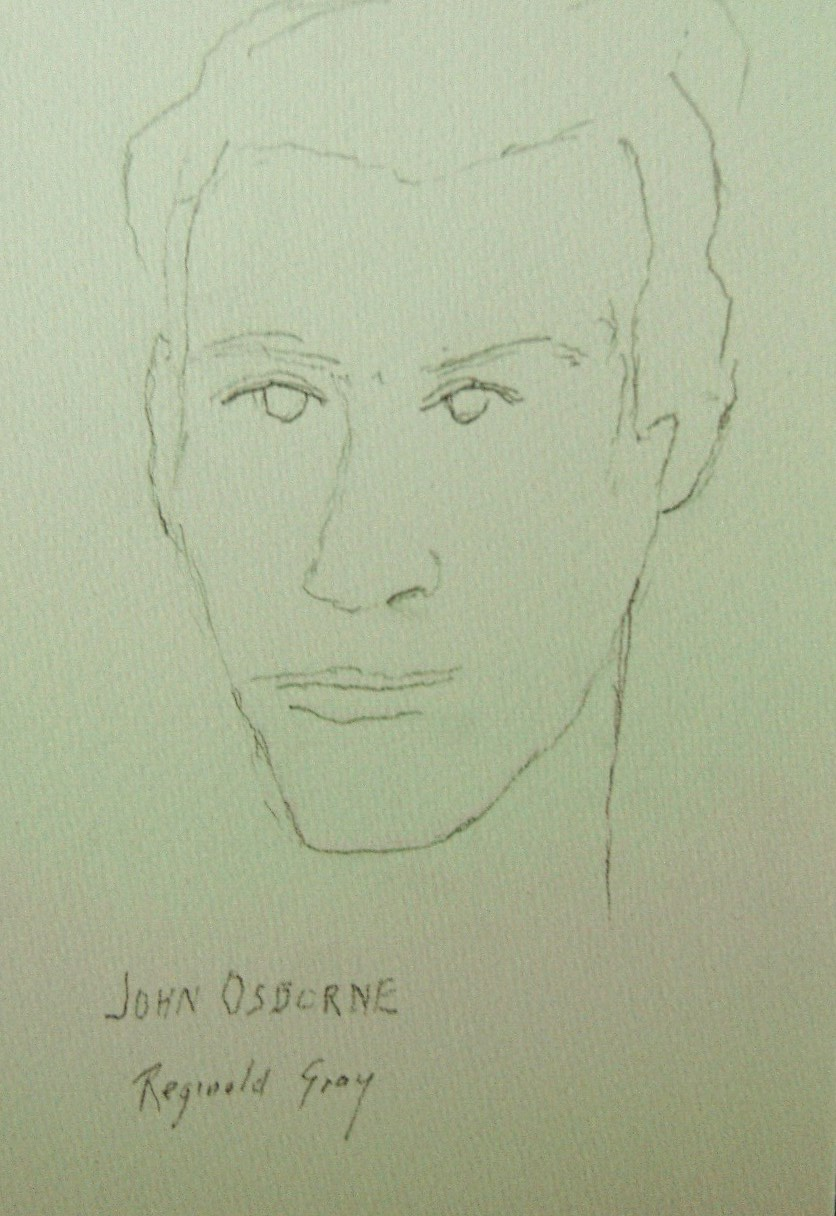
- Portrait of Osborne by Reginald Gray
- Original language: English
- Written by: John Osborne
- Subject: A gossip columnist encounters the absurdities of high-life
- Genre: musical theatre

Premiere
- Date: 5 May 1959
- Place: Palace Theatre, London

The World of Paul Slickey (1959) is a play by John Osborne. It was Osborne's only musical, intended as a social satire on high-society gossip columnists. After the huge successes of Osborne's previous plays Look Back in Anger and The Entertainer, the play was to become "one of the most spectacular disasters in English theatre".

== Creation ==
The play was based on an earlier unproduced drama called An Artificial Comedy, or Love in a Myth, which had been turned down for production by both George Devine and Tony Richardson. Osborne adapted it to become a musical, with deliberately "cartoon characters". The adapted version was produced by Donald Albery. Osborne directed. The music for the songs was written by Christopher Whelen, an established composer of incidental music for theatre. The lyrics were by Osborne. Hugh Casson designed the set. Kenneth MacMillan choreographed the dance sequences.

The play's central character, Paul Slickey, was based on gossip columnist William Hickey.

== Plot ==
Journalist Jack Oakham uses the pseudonym Paul Slickey for his gossip column in which he takes swipes at the lifestyles of the rich and famous. He explores the lives of troubled couple Lesley and Michael, rich, young people who propose to solve their marriage problems by both having sex changes. He also follows the hopelessly archaic aristocrats Lord and Lady Mortlake and the Giltedge-Whytes, along with brash young pop star Terry Maroon. As the empty and silly lives of the people he covers start to affect him, Jack finds it increasingly difficult to do his job, and his own marriage suffers.

== Production ==
The play was a critical disaster. On the opening night, the audience booed at the end, and one of the cast, Adrienne Corri, made V signs at the audience and told them "go fuck yourselves". Among the booing members of the audience were John Gielgud and Noël Coward, who later wrote in his diary "never in all my theatrical experience have I seen anything so appalling, appalling from every point of view". As Osborne left the theatre, he was chased by "furious theatregoers" down Charing Cross Road. The play closed after six weeks.

== Reception ==
Critics were overwhelmingly negative. It was described as "the biggest floperoo ever”, an “evening of general embarrassment”, and a “sad day for Osborne”. According to The Times it exuded "extraordinary dullness", and the Evening Standard stated that it was "incredibly naive and dull". Dancing Times was positive about some of Kenneth MacMillan's work, calling the sequence ‘On Ice’ "a clever satire on smart women journalists, inspired by those absurd attitudes struck by models on the fashion pages of the glossy weeklies", but it objected to another as “a nightmare ritual taking the form of a rowdy alcoholic rock’n’roll orgy".

Writing in 1965, critic George Wellwarth took a different view of the play, writing

The World of Paul Slickey is pure spit and vomit thrown directly into the teeth of the audience. Commercially it has been Osborne's least successful play; artistically it is his best. Inability to compromise may be disastrous from a diplomatic viewpoint, but art is not diplomacy: it is truth.
