= Plays for England =

- Written by: John Osborne
- Original language: English

Premiere
- Date premiered: 19 June 1962

Plays for England was the title of a double-bill of plays written, performed and published by John Osborne, released by Evans Brothers Limited in London in 1962. It comprised The Blood of the Bambergs and Under Plain Cover.

== Plays ==
- The Blood of the Bambergs, subtitled “A Fairy Story,” was originally performed on 19 June 1962 at the Royal Court Theatre, directed by John Dexter.
- Under Plain Cover was originally performed on 19 June 1962 at the Royal Court Theatre, directed by Jonathan Miller.
