= Norman Morrice =

British dancer, choreographer and artistic director

- Born: 10 September 1931; Agua Dulce, Mexico
- Died: 11 January 2008 (aged 76); London
- Occupations: Ballet dancer and choreographer
- Known for: Artistic director of Ballet Rambert from 1966–74, and the Royal Ballet from 1977–86

Norman Alexander Morrice (10 September 1931 – 11 January 2008) was a British dancer, choreographer and artistic director of both Ballet Rambert from 1966 to 1974 and the Royal Ballet from 1977 to 1986, two of the UK's major ballet companies.

== Early life ==
Norman Morrice was born in Agua Dulce, Mexico, on 10 September 1931, the second son of a British expatriate oil engineer. Morrice remained a Mexican citizen until he finished school, and this gave him an exemption from National Service in the UK. According to The Daily Telegraph, "this fact may have explained why he was the only Royal Ballet director to receive no public honour".

While still a boy, Morrice joined Marie Rambert's ballet school, and then her company as a dancer in 1952.

== Career ==
His first fully independent choreographed piece was Two Brothers (1958), a "powerful narrative of sibling rivalry and violence in an urban setting", and designed by Ralph Koltai. Morrice, like his contemporary fellow choreographers Kenneth MacMillan and Peter Darrell, was part of the Angry Young Men movement in theatre, that sought to dramatise ordinary life. Koltai was the first of several designers who were to become well known in ballet through their work with Morrice. Two Brothers was an immediate success, and it was soon televised, giving Morrice a wide British reputation, and was drawing admiration at Jacob's Pillow, the longest running dance festival in the US.

In 1961, he received a Ford Foundation fellowship which enabled Morrice to study with the American dancer and teacher: Martha Graham for a year, and she became a major influence for him as they formed a lasting and deep friendship.

The ballet Cul de Sac, with music by Christopher Whelen, was staged by Ballet Rambert on 13 July 1964 at Sadler's Wells. Morrice persuaded Ballet Rambert that their difficult finances could be fixed by dropping the corps de ballet and focusing on a solely modern repertory and a troupe of just sixteen to eighteen, all of soloist standard. In 1966, this plan became reality, and Morrice became co-director alongside Marie Rambert.

From 1970–74, Morrice was artistic director of Ballet Rambert, until he resigned to work as a freelance choreographer.

Morrice was artistic director of the Royal Ballet from 1977–86. Marie Rambert persuaded him to take on the role, and he nurtured new choreographers including Ashley Page, Michael Corder, and Richard Alston, all of whom made their debuts on the stage of the Royal Opera House.

In 1986, Morrice was succeeded by Anthony Dowell, and became director of choreographic studies at the Royal Ballet School, where he helped with the emergence of a new generation of choreographers, including Will Tuckett, Christopher Wheeldon, Christopher Hampson, Cathy Marston, and David Dawson.

He died in his sleep at his home in west London on 11 January 2008, of chronic obstructive pulmonary disease.

== Awards ==
In 1974, he received the Royal Academy of Dance's Queen Elizabeth II Coronation Award.

== Original works (partial) ==
- Two Brothers (1958) (music Ernst von Dohnányi)
- Hazaña (1959) (music Carlos Surinach)
- A Place in the Desert (1961) (music Carlos Surinach)
- Conflicts (1962) (music Ernest Bloch)
- The Travellers (1963) (music by Leonard Salzedo)
- Cul de Sac (1964) (music Christopher Whelen)
- The Realms of Choice (1965) (music by Leonard Salzedo)
- The Tribute (1965) (music Roger Sessions)
- Hazard (1967) (music Leonard Salzedo)
- 1-2-3 (1968) (music Ben-Zion Orgad)
- Them and Us (1968) (music by Iannis Xenakis)
- Blind-Sight (1969) (music Bob Downes)
- Pastorale Variée (1969) (music Paul Ben-Haim)
- The Empty Suit (1970) (music Leonard Salzedo)
- Solo (1971) (music by Bob Downes)
- That is the Show (1971) (music Luciano Berio)
- Ladies Ladies! (1972) (music Anthony Hymas)
- Isolde (1973) (music John Lewis)
- Spindrift (1974) (music by John Lewis)
- The sea whisper'd me (1976) (music by Carlos Miranda)
- Smiling Immortal (1977) (music by Jonathan Harvey)

Cultural offices
Preceded by Sir Kenneth MacMillan	Artistic Director, The Royal Ballet; 1977–1986	Succeeded by Sir Anthony Dowell
