= Look Back in Anger (1989 film) =

- Based on: Look Back in Anger; 1956 play by John Osborne
- Written by: John Osborne (play)
- Directed by: Judi Dench
- Starring: Kenneth Branagh; Emma Thompson
- Music by: Patrick Doyle
- Country of origin: United Kingdom
- Original language: English

Production
- Producers: Humphrey Barclay; David Parfitt; Moira Williams
- Cinematography: Albert Almond
- Editor: Dave Lewinton
- Running time: 115 minutes
- Production companies: First Choice Productions; Thames Television

Original release
- Network: Channel 4
- Release: 28 December 1989

Look Back in Anger is a 1989 British television production of John Osborne's play. It features Kenneth Branagh, Emma Thompson, Siobhan Redmond, Gerard Horan, and Edward Jewesbury. It was directed by Judi Dench; and produced by Humphrey Barclay, Moira Williams, and First Choice Productions for Thames Television and it was aired on Channel 4 on 28 December 1989.

== Plot ==
Look Back in Anger is a love triangle involving the brilliant-but-disaffected young Jimmy Porter (Branagh), his upper-middle-class, impassive wife Alison Porter (Thompson), and her aristocratic best friend Helena Charles (Redmond). Cliff (Horan), an amiable Welsh lodger, attempts to keep the peace.

== Cast ==
- Jimmy Porter – Kenneth Branagh
- Alison Porter – Emma Thompson
- Helena Charles – Siobhan Redmond
- Cliff Lewis – Gerard Horan
- Colonel Redfern – Edward Jewesbury
