= Conference of the Birds: The Story of Peter Brook in Africa =

1977 book by John Heilpern

- First edition
- Author: John Heilpern
- Language: English
- Subject: Peter Brook
- Publisher: Faber and Faber
- Publication date: 1977
- Publication place: England
- Media type: Print (hardcover)
- Pages: 317
- ISBN: 9780571103720
- OCLC: 3629727
- Followed by: How Good is David Mamet, Anyway?: Writings on Theater—and Why It Matters

Conference of the Birds: The Story of Peter Brook in Africa is a biographical book by John Heilpern, in which he describes a voyage by theatre director Peter Brook and a group of actors (including Helen Mirren) through North and West Africa, including a journey across the Sahara.

The journey was part of Brook's attempt to develop a form of theatre which did not depend on the cultural assumptions of the audience.

The company tested some forms of theatre which they had devised at the Centre International de Recherche Théâtrale, by performing them for peoples with whom the actors shared neither common language nor culture. One of the pieces they performed was La Conférence des oiseaux, Brook's stage adaptation of the 12th-century Persian poem The Conference of the Birds by Attar of Nishapur.
