= Anthony Creighton =

British actor and writer (1922–2005)

Anthony Creighton (1922, Swanage – 22 March 2005), a British actor and writer, is best known as the co-author of the play Epitaph for George Dillon with John Osborne.

He served in the RAF during the war as a navigator on bomber aircraft. He was awarded the DFC for gallantry for saving the crew of his Halifax bomber over Hamburg. During the war he met Terence Rattigan who was then a wireless operator and air gunner. They appeared together in entertainment for fellow servicemen at RAF ground stations. After the war he completed a course at RADA and subsequently joined a company at Barnstaple in Devon. Shortly afterward he formed his own travelling company, the Saga Repertory Group, with £200 given to him by his mother and was joined by three other actors from Barnstaple. An advertisement in The Stage in 1949 offering actors expenses but no salary was answered by John Osborne who joined the company in Ilfracombe. His company took their plays from village to village but enjoyed little success; they presented a summer residency at the Victoria Theatre on Hayling Island but this too was short-lived. Shortly after he collaborated on two plays with Osborne: the first, Personal Enemy, fell foul of the censors at the time; the second was An Epitaph for George Dillon.

Although Creighton had little other dramatic success, he remained a close friend and confidant of Osborne, and was living with him on a houseboat in the Thames in 1954, the year Osborne wrote Look Back in Anger. Creighton is believed to have been the model for Cliff in the play.

In 1960 Creighton co-wrote another play with the American writer-director Bernard Miller, Tomorrow with Pictures, which was produced at the Lyric Hammersmith in 1961. It was to be Creighton's last produced play. Subsequently he taught drama at various London education establishments. The friendship between Osborne and Creighton did not endure. In some accounts, they drifted apart, but according to one biography of Osborne, a drunk Creighton told him at the opening-night party of A Patriot for Me how much he disliked the play, and Osborne had him thrown out.

He met Osborne on one last occasion in 1994, at Osborne's country home, to discuss George Dillon royalty payments. Osborne was by then a diagnosed diabetic and a near shadow of his former self; he died shortly after the meeting. Creighton said of the visit that he would prefer to remember the impecunious but happier times of the 1950s: "I look back on Osborne with love".

Towards the end of his life, Creighton attracted controversy for different reasons. After Osborne's death in 1994, Creighton claimed in an interview with the critic Nicholas de Jongh that he and Osborne had lived together as lovers. Osborne's surviving family were quick to refute any suggestion of homosexuality on Osborne's part. Creighton finally admitted in an interview with Osborne's biographer, John Heilpern, that he had lied to de Jongh and no homosexual relationship had ever existed. Creighton's proximity to the Angry Young Men of the 1950s and 1960s make his extensive collection of letters and diaries of considerable historical importance.
