= Look Back in Anger (1980 film) =

1980 television film directed by Lindsay Anderson and David Hugh Jones

- Based on: Look Back in Anger (1956 play) by John Osborne
- Written by: John Osborne
- Directed by: Lindsay Anderson; David Hugh Jones
- Starring: Malcolm McDowell; Lisa Banes; Fran Brill; Robert Burr; Raymond Hardie
- Countries of origin: United Kingdom; United States
- Original language: English

Production
- Producers: Don Boyd; Charles Braverman
- Running time: 100 minutes
- Production companies: Crossover Programming Company; Kendon Films

Original release
- Network: PBS
- Release: July 2, 1980

Look Back in Anger is a 1980 television film based on John Osborne's 1956 play. It is directed by Lindsay Anderson and David Hugh Jones, and stars Malcolm McDowell, Lisa Banes and Fran Brill.

Anderson, who had previously worked with Malcolm McDowell on if.... and O Lucky Man!, translated Ted Craig's Roundabout Theatre Company off-Broadway production (in which McDowell was starring) to the screen, and taped results in three days. It was aired in the United States on PBS and Showtime, and later released on VHS by Warner Home Video.

== Plot ==
Look Back in Anger is about a love triangle involving an intelligent but disaffected young man Jimmy Porter, his upper-middle-class, impassive wife Alison Porter, and her snooty best friend Helena Charles. Cliff, an amiable Welsh lodger, attempts to keep the peace.

== Cast ==
- Malcolm McDowell as Jimmy Porter
- Lisa Banes as Alison Porter
- Fran Brill as Helena Charles
- Raymond Hardie as Cliff Lewis
- Robert Burr as Colonel Redfern

== Release ==
The film premiered on PBS in July 1980. It later aired in 1981 on Showtime, as part of their Broadway on Showtime anthology programme. It was released on VHS by Warner Home Video.

== Reception ==
John J. O'Connor of The New York Times gave the film a mixed review, writing "Mr. McDowell and the rest of the cast tended to talk in whispers, conveying the curious impression that they didn't want to disturb the next-door neighbors. Perhaps Mr. Anderson wanted to give Jimmy's male chauvinism a softer edge for contemporary audiences. But he and Mr. McDowell succeeded only in making the character disconcertingly dull."

The film was nominated for a 1982 CableACE Award for Best Single Program - Dramatic Presentation.
