= The Blood of the Bambergs =

Play by John Osborne

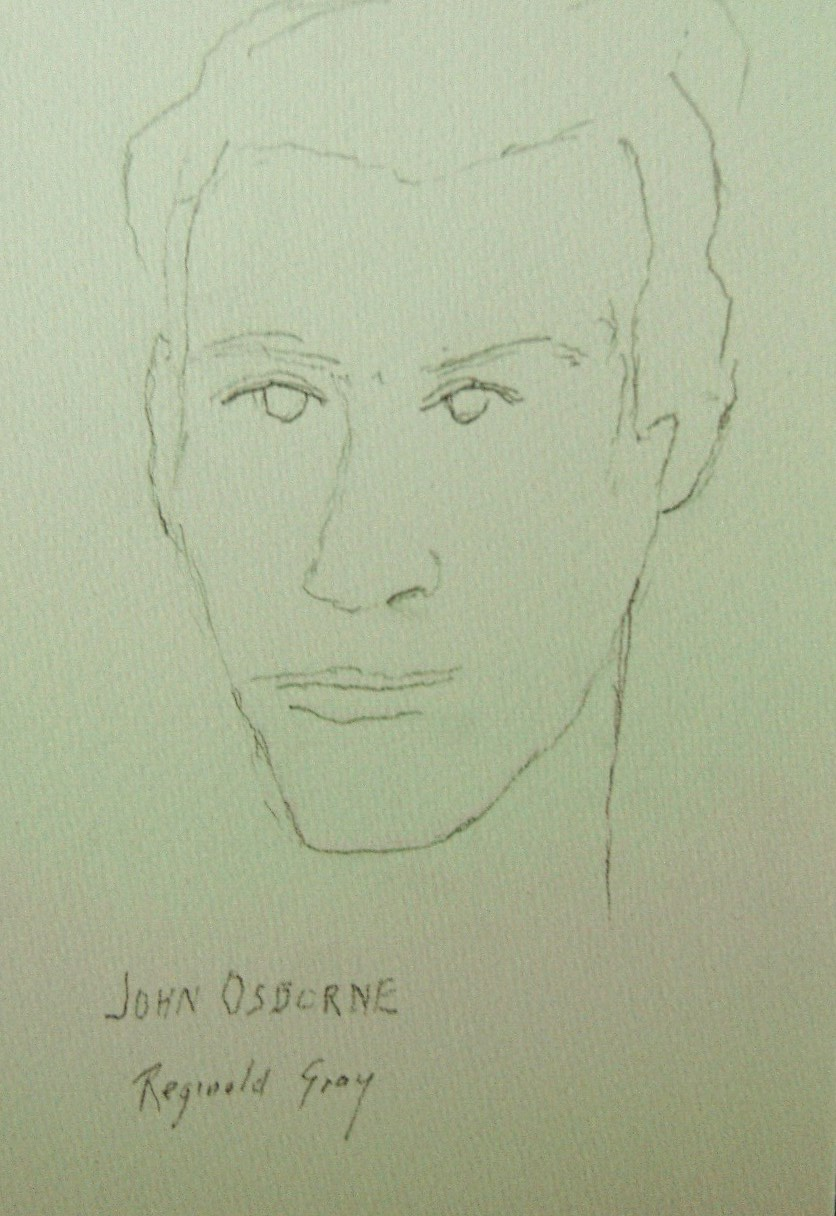
- Portrait of Osborne by Reginald Gray
- Original language: English
- Written by: John Osborne
- Subject: A man has to stand in for a prince at a royal wedding
- Genre: satire

Premiere
- Date: 19 June 1962
- Place: Royal Court Theatre

The Blood of the Bambergs (1962) is a short two-act play by John Osborne, published in his book "Plays for England". It was designed to be shown in a double-bill with another short play, Under Plain Cover. The Blood of the Bambergs is a satirical commentary on royal weddings, in a variation on the story of The Prisoner of Zenda.

== Background ==
The play was inspired by the popular celebrations surrounding the marriage of Princess Margaret to Anthony Armstrong-Jones. Osborne's wife, the journalist Penelope Gilliatt, provided him with 'backstage gossip' about the arrangement of the events, which Osborne found absurd. Satire of the monarchy was still not acceptable on the English stage. Nevertheless, the Lord Chamberlain's office, which could effectively censor plays by denying them a license to perform, felt unable to reject the play. The "devilish cleverness of this horrid play", wrote the author of the office's report, is that "If a licence is refused, this can at once be presented as a ridiculous banning of the old Prisoner of Zenda story sixty years later".

== Plot ==
British Princess Melanie of Bamberg is to be married to Prince Willy, heir to the throne of another kingdom. On his way to the wedding, Willy is killed in a road accident. State officials do not know what to do. The marriage is crucial for the future of the nation - especially as the next in line for the throne, the prince's brother, is a flagrant homosexual, unlikely to produce an heir. They discover that Russell, a brash Australian photographer, looks exactly like the deceased Willy. Russell is none too keen to take the job, but is enticed when he is told of all the advantages he will have as Prince Consort, not the least of which is the highly desirable Princess Melanie herself. However, Melanie, though beautiful, is a bully. She is appalled by the idea that she should marry a vulgar Australian. All is resolved when it is discovered that Russell is of royal blood, related to Willy through a royal affair with a commoner.

== Reception ==
The play has typically been regarded as a clumsy work, showing Osborne's "lack of talent for satire", as Colin Wilson said. John Russell Taylor says that it is "by general consent the least satisfactory of all Osborne's plays" and "easiest the feeblest work Osborne has yet allowed to reach the stage".
