= Personal Enemy =

- Written by: John Osborne
- Original language: English
- Genre: social realism
- Setting: A small American town

Premiere
- Date premiered: 1955
- Place premiered: Harrogate

Personal Enemy is a play by John Osborne and Anthony Creighton. It was written in 1954, prior to Osborne's 'big break' with Look Back in Anger at the Royal Court Theatre in 1956, and first performed in Harrogate in 1955. It was thought that the play manuscript was lost, but copies were found (along with another early Osborne play, The Devil Inside Him) in the Lord Chamberlain's archive in the British Library in 2008. The two plays were subsequently published as Before Anger, with a foreword by Peter Nichols. Personal Enemy was produced in its uncensored form for the first time in 2010 at the White Bear Theatre, as part of their Lost Classics Project, before transferring to New York's Brits Off Broadway festival at 59E59 Theaters in November of that year. The play is the only work by Osborne to be set in the United States.

== Scenario ==
Set in 1953, in the fictional US town of Langley Springs, Personal Enemy tells us the story of the Constant family. Mrs Constant is the head of the household and inspiration of the town. Her qualities and principles embody the ethos of the community: decency, godliness and pleasantness are paramount. Mr Constant is doing well for himself — the American Dream is becoming a reality for this hard working, decent, suburban man in the insurance racket.

=== Plot ===
The play opens on Mrs Constant's birthday. Her daughter, Caryl, her son-in-law, Sam, and her last remaining son, Arnie, are planning a picnic. Tomorrow is the second anniversary of Donald Constant's death. Mrs Constant's eldest son died defending American ideals in the Korean War. A corner of the Constant living room is devoted to enshrining his memory. However, Don was not perhaps as strait-laced as she might have thought. When Caryl discovers a book full of dangerous ideas that Arnie is reading — and the inscription within it from the communist librarian, Ward Perry — she reveals that Don, too, had a friendship with Ward, and that he too had been given a copy of the forbidden book. Caryl launches an attack on her brothers and their high ideas, asserting an image of a world that is structured, logical and controlled and she accuses ‘clever-talk’ of perverting that world into something messy, tangled and interconnected. Her tirade is halted by a telegram informing the Constants that Don is alive. He was a prisoner of war and will be returning to the USA shortly.

A few days later, we rejoin Mrs Constant as she prepares the house for Don's return, which she does with the help of Mrs Slifer, their Polish-born neighbour. Her preparations are soon disturbed by the arrival of the Federal Investigator. This servant of the state informs Mr and Mrs Constant that Don has refused to repatriate, deciding instead to stay in Korea and defect to Communist North Korea. The government, says the Investigator, is very concerned by this and has come to look into what influenced Don to defect. Don's books are of particular interest. The Investigator takes away Don's copy of the book given to both him and Arnie by Ward Perry. When the Investigator has left, and Mr Constant has comforted his wife as much as possible before returning to work, Mrs Constant pins Arnie down into an interrogation of his relationship with Ward Perry, worried about the political and sexual decisions she feels her son is being led into. Arnie passionately and eloquently defends his freedom to socialise with whomever he pleases, and tries to reassure his mother that he is more than capable of making his own decisions about his political beliefs. Shortly after Arnie leaves this conversation, Mrs Constant takes a call that is meant for Arnie. It is Ward Perry. She takes the opportunity to ask him to come round and talk with her. She intends to interrogate him.

In the evening of the same day, Mrs Constant and Caryl are making preparations for the interrogation. Mr Constant has attempted to take charge of the situation, wanting to talk to Ward alone in his study, in order to come to a calm informed solution to the problem of Ward's relationship with Arnie. Mr Constant has therefore refused to have any part in it. Ward Perry arrives and is ruthlessly asked to defend his lifestyle by the Constant women, whilst Sam impotently tries to temper the situation. Ward tries to remain aloof and polite but has his fill and refuses to be interrogated any further. At that very moment Arnie comes home and, seeing Ward leaving, chases after him. When he returns he informs his mother that Ward has said he wants nothing more to do with Arnie. Arnie is devastated and in his emotional tumult confesses to being a ‘Commie and a pervert.' Mrs Constant savagely beats her son repeatedly calling him a 'little beast.'

A few weeks later we rejoin Mrs Constant. She is a shell of her former self. It is Reverend Merrick who informs us of the reason for this: Arnie has drowned himself to his mother's great shame. Merrick seems to offer a way out for Mrs Constant, by suggesting that Arnie committed suicide not because he was gay but, on the contrary, because he had fathered the child of a coloured girl in the town. Meanwhile, Mr Constant has been called to testify at the House Committee on Un-American Activities, and has thus lost his job, and is accused of becoming a drunk. Mrs Slifer's son Paul has also lost his job in Washington due to the McCarthy witch hunts. Ward Perry arrives to tell Mrs Constant that he has heard from Don, and in an act of love he wants to give her back her pride in her sons. She responds only with hatred. Sam finally erupts at Caryl and Mrs Constant, but somewhat misses the point, blaming their spitefulness on their womanhood, and revealing his own shameful prejudices. Eventually Mr Constant resolves to travel to the committee with Ward Perry: in his gentle way he is refusing to be pushed around, and refusing to be segregated from his fellow man. In the end, we are given a glimpse of a way back for the stuttering paralyzed hope of the American Dream, as Mrs Constant resolves to look after the coloured girl's baby — and we hope take pride in it for being itself.

== Productions ==
The play was originally performed in Harrogate in 1955, but was heavily cut by the Lord Chamberlain's office, who objected to the homosexual undercurrents in the play. The production was largely panned by critics, as it made little sense after the censor's cuts.

The play was performed uncut at the White Bear Theatre (London) in June/July 2010 by FallOut Theatre. The production was directed by David Aula, with set designed by Anna Hourriere, sound designed by Edward Lewis and lighting designed by James Baggaley. The cast was as follows: Karen Lewis (Mrs Constant), James Callum (Mr Constant), Joanne King (Caryl Kessler), Mark Oosterveen (Sam Kessler), Peter Clapp (Arnie Constant), Genevieve Allenbury (Mrs Slifer) and Steven Clarke (Ward Perry/The Investigator/Reverend Merrick). Music for the production was composed and performed by Luke Rosier.

The FallOut production transferred to the Brits Off Broadway festival in New York in November 2010, where it ran for 28 performances at 59E59 Theaters. In New York, the part of Mr Constant was played by Tony Turner.
