= Phyllis Hartnoll =

British poet, author and editor (1906–1997)

Phyllis Hartnoll (22 September 1906, in Egypt – 8 January 1997, in Lyme Regis) was a British poet, author and editor.

Hartnoll was educated at Cheltenham Ladies' College and read English at St Hugh's College, Oxford, winning the Newdigate Prize for poetry in 1929, and at the Universities of Lyons and Algiers. From 1929 to 1967, she worked as a books editor for the publishers Macmillan. As a theatre historian, she was a founder member of the Society for Theatre Research in 1948; the other founders contributed to her Oxford Companion to the Theatre, the first edition of which appeared in 1951.

A collection of her poems, The maid's song and other poems, was published by Macmillan in 1938. She wrote the introduction to the Gothic novel Zastrozzi by Percy Bysshe Shelley which was republished in a limited edition by the Golden Cockerel Press in 1955.

== Selected publications ==
- Oxford Companion to the Theatre (1951: Oxford UP; 2nd ed, 1957; 3rd ed 1967)
