= Helen Osborne =

British journalist and critic

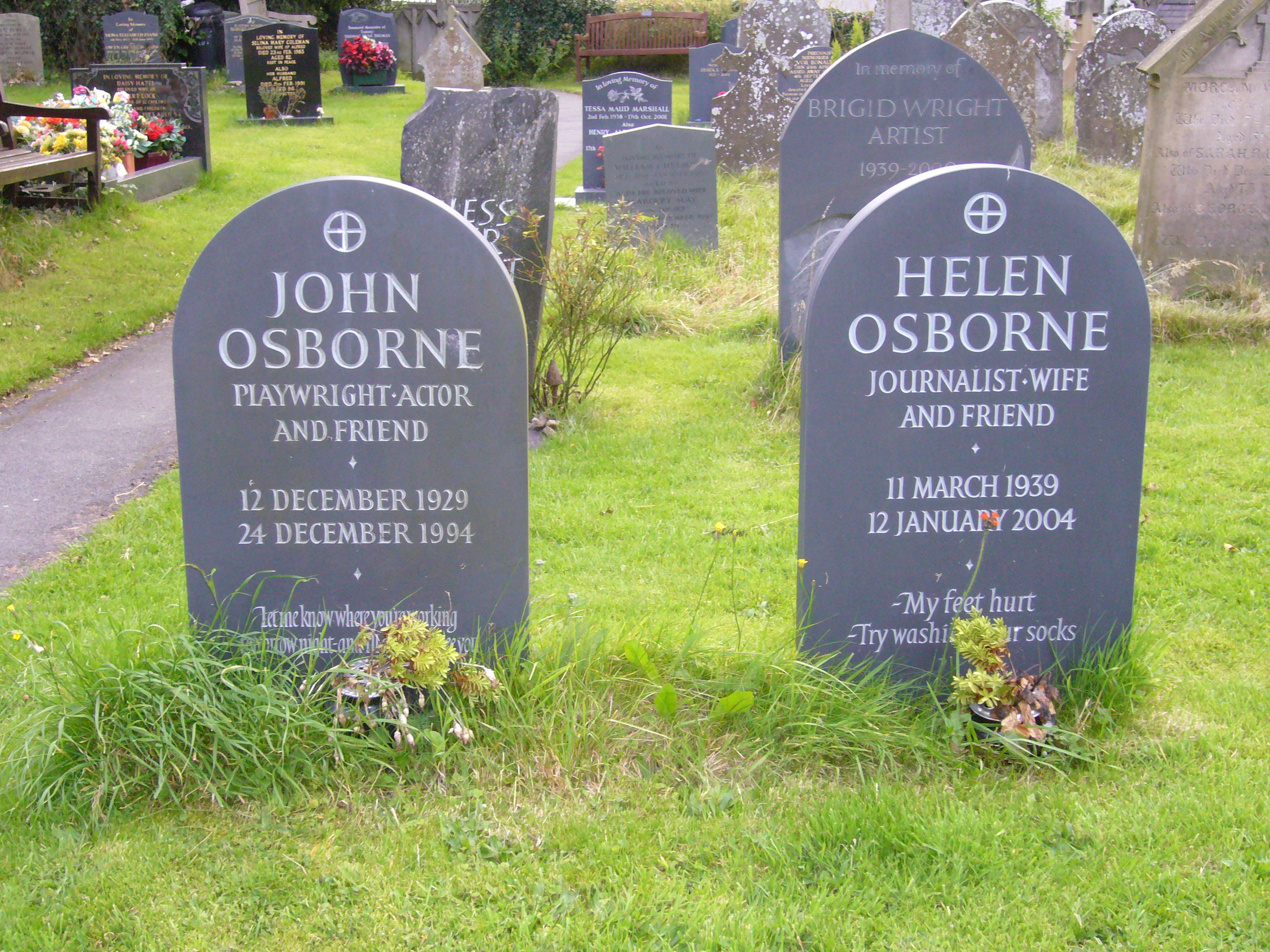
Grave of John Osborne and his fifth wife in St George's churchyard, Clun, Shropshire, UK.

Helen Osborne (11 March 1939 – 12 January 2004) was a British journalist and critic, and the fifth wife of the playwright John Osborne.

She was born Helen Dawson, in Newcastle-upon-Tyne, and educated at The Mount School, York, and Durham University, where she received a bachelor's degree in history.

She worked at The Observer for the arts editor Richard Findlater, becoming drama critic and then arts editor.

In Clive James' memoir of this period, North Face of Soho, James says of Osborne (née Dawson), she "was clearly the brains of the outfit. Her tongue was keen to match. Even when she approved of what I said, she spoke as if I were trying to sell her a used car, and she met any loose opinion with plain scorn. Her level of aggression was rare for a woman in an English context, and would have been rare for a leopard in an African context."
