= Harold Hobson =

English drama critic and author (1904–1992)

Sir Harold Hobson CBE, (4 August 1904 – 12 March 1992) was an English drama critic and author.

== Early life and education ==
Hobson was born in Thorpe Hesley, near Rotherham, then in the West Riding of Yorkshire, England. He attended Sheffield Grammar School, from where he gained a scholarship to Oriel College at Oxford University, graduating with a second-class degree in Modern History in 1928.

== Career ==
In 1931, he began to write London theatre reviews for The Christian Science Monitor. In 1935, he was employed on the paper's staff, remaining its London drama critic until 1974. He was an assistant literary editor for The Sunday Times from 1944 and later became its drama critic (1947–76).

Hobson was the only drama critic to recognise the early Harold Pinter's talent as a dramatist and wrote of The Birthday Party: "I am willing to risk whatever reputation I have as a judge of plays by saying ... that Mr Pinter, on the evidence of this work, possesses the most original, disturbing and arresting talent in theatrical London." During his career, he was to champion many other new playwrights, especially John Osborne, Samuel Beckett and Tom Stoppard.

Hobson also wrote for Drama and The Listener and was a regular member of the BBC radio programme The Critics. He was invited by Peter Hall to join the board of the National Theatre.

Hobson wrote books relating to British and French theatre, including his autobiography Indirect Journey (1978), and a personal history based on his work as a drama critic, Theatre in Britain (1984). He also wrote a novel, The Devil in Woodford Wells (1946).

Harold Hobson was made a Commander of the Order of the British Empire in 1971, and knighted in 1977.
