= John Osborne =

English playwright (1929–1994)

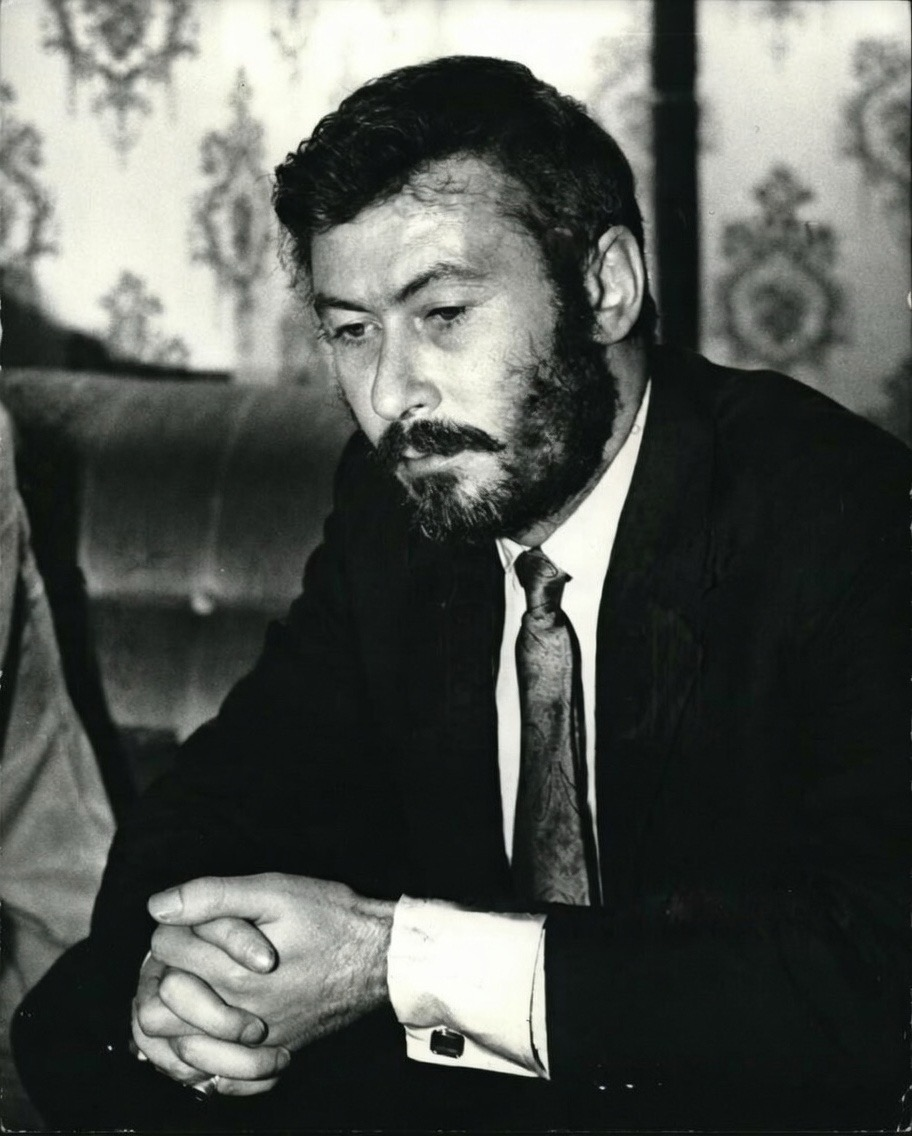
- Osborne in 1970
- Born: John James Osborne; 12 December 1929; Fulham, London, England
- Died: 24 December 1994 (aged 65); Clun, Shropshire, England
- Occupations: Playwright; screenwriter; political activist
- Spouse(s): Pamela Lane; Mary Ure; Penelope Gilliatt; Jill Bennett; Helen Dawson
- Children: 1
- Writing career
- Period: 1950–1992
- Genres: Social realism; kitchen sink drama
- Notable works: Look Back in Anger; The Entertainer; Inadmissible Evidence
- Notable awards: Tony Award for Best Play (Luther, 1964); Academy Award for Best Adapted Screenplay (Tom Jones, 1964); BAFTA Award for Best British Screenplay (Tom Jones, 1964)
- Movement: Angry Young Men

John James Osborne (12 December 1929 – 24 December 1994) was an English playwright, screenwriter, actor, and entrepreneur, who is regarded as one of the most influential figures in post-war theatre. Born in London, he briefly worked as a journalist before starting out in theatre as a stage manager and actor. He lived in poverty for several years before his third produced play, Look Back in Anger (1956), brought him national fame.

Based on Osborne's volatile relationship with his first wife, Pamela Lane, it is considered the first work of kitchen sink realism, initiating a movement which made use of social realism and domestic settings to address disillusion with British society in the waning years of the Empire. The phrase “angry young man”, coined by George Fearon (press officer for the Royal Court Theatre) to describe Osborne when promoting the play, came to embody the predominantly working class and left-wing writers within this movement. Osborne was considered its leading figure due to his often controversial left-wing politics, though critics nevertheless noted a conservative strain even in his early writing.

The Entertainer (1957), Luther (1961), and Inadmissable Evidence (1964) were also well-received, Luther winning the 1964 Tony Award for Best Play, though reception to his later plays was less favourable. During this period Osborne began writing and acting for television and appearing in films, most notably as crime boss Cyril Kinnear in Get Carter (1971).

In 1958, Osborne joined Look Back in Anger director Tony Richardson and film producer Harry Saltzman to form Woodfall Film Productions, in order to produce Richardson's 1959 film adaptation of Anger and other works of kitchen sink realism, spearheading the British New Wave. This included Osborne-penned adaptations of The Entertainer (1960) (co-written by Nigel Kneale), and Inadmissible Evidence (1968), as well as the period comedy Tom Jones (1963), for which he won the Academy Award for Best Adapted Screenplay and BAFTA Award for Best British Screenplay.

Osborne was married five times, but the first four were troubled by affairs and his mistreatment of his partners. In 1978 he married Helen Dawson, and from 1986 they lived in rural Shropshire. He wrote two volumes of autobiography, A Better Class of Person (1981) and Almost a Gentleman (1991), and a collection of his non-fiction writing, Damn You, England, was published in 1994. He died from complications of diabetes on 24 December of that year at the age of 65.

== Early life ==
Osborne was born on 12 December 1929 in London, the son of Thomas Godfrey Osborne, a commercial artist and advertising copywriter of South Welsh ancestry, and Nellie Beatrice Grove, a Cockney barmaid.

In 1936, the family moved to the north Surrey suburb of Stoneleigh, where Thomas's mother had already settled. Osborne, however, would regard it as a cultural desert – a school friend declared subsequently that "he thought [we] were a lot of dull, uninteresting people." He adored his father but hated his mother, whom he described as "hypocritical, self-absorbed, calculating and indifferent."

Thomas Osborne died in 1940, leaving the young boy an insurance settlement which he used to pay for a private education at Belmont College, a minor public school in Barnstaple, Devon. He entered the school in 1943, but was expelled in the summer term of 1945. Osborne claimed this was for hitting the headmaster, who had struck him for listening to a broadcast by Frank Sinatra, but another former pupil asserted that Osborne was caught fighting with other pupils and did not assault the headmaster. A School Certificate was the only formal qualification he acquired.

== Career ==
After school, Osborne went home to his mother in London and briefly tried trade journalism. A job tutoring a touring company of junior actors introduced him to the theatre. He soon became involved as a stage manager and actor and joined Anthony Creighton's provincial touring company. Osborne tried his hand at writing plays, co-writing his first, The Devil Inside Him, with his mentor Stella Linden, who directed it at the Theatre Royal in Huddersfield in 1950. In June 1951 Osborne married Pamela Lane. His second play, Personal Enemy, was written with Anthony Creighton, with whom he later wrote Epitaph for George Dillon, staged at the Royal Court in 1958. Personal Enemy was staged in regional theatres before he submitted Look Back in Anger.

=== Look Back in Anger ===
Look Back in Anger was written in 17 days in a deck chair on Morecambe pier where Osborne was performing in Hugh Hastings' play Seagulls over Sorrento in a repertory theatre. Osborne's play is largely autobiographical, based on his time living, and arguing, with Pamela Lane in cramped accommodation in Derby, while she had an affair with a local dentist. It was submitted to several agents in London, who rejected it. In his autobiography, Osborne writes: "The speed with which it had been returned was not surprising, but its aggressive dispatch did give me a kind of baffled relief. It was like being grasped at the upper arm by a testy policeman and told to move on". Finally it was sent to the new English Stage Company at London's Royal Court Theatre.

Formed by actor-manager and artistic director George Devine, the company had seen its first two productions perform disappointingly. Devine was prepared to gamble on this play because he saw in it a powerful articulation of a new post-war spirit. Osborne was living on a houseboat with Creighton at Cubitts Yacht Basin in Chiswick on the River Thames at the time and eating stewed nettles from the riverbank. When Devine accepted the play, he had to row out to the houseboat to speak to Osborne. The play was directed by Tony Richardson and starred Kenneth Haigh, Mary Ure and Alan Bates. George Fearon, a press officer at the theatre, used the phrase "angry young man" when promoting Look Back in Anger. He told Osborne that he disliked the play and feared it would be impossible to market.

Reviews of Look Back in Anger were mixed: most of the critics who attended the first night felt it was a failure. Positive reviews from Kenneth Tynan and Harold Hobson, however, plus a TV broadcast of Act 2, helped create interest, and the play transferred successfully to the Lyric Theatre (Hammersmith) and to Broadway, later touring to Moscow. A film version was released in May 1959 with Richard Burton and Mary Ure in the leading roles. The play brought Osborne fame and won him the Evening Standard Drama Award as the most promising playwright of 1956.

During production Osborne, then married, began a relationship with (Eileen) Mary Ure, and would divorce his wife, Pamela Lane, to marry Ure in 1957. Ure died in 1975.

=== The Entertainer and into the 1960s ===
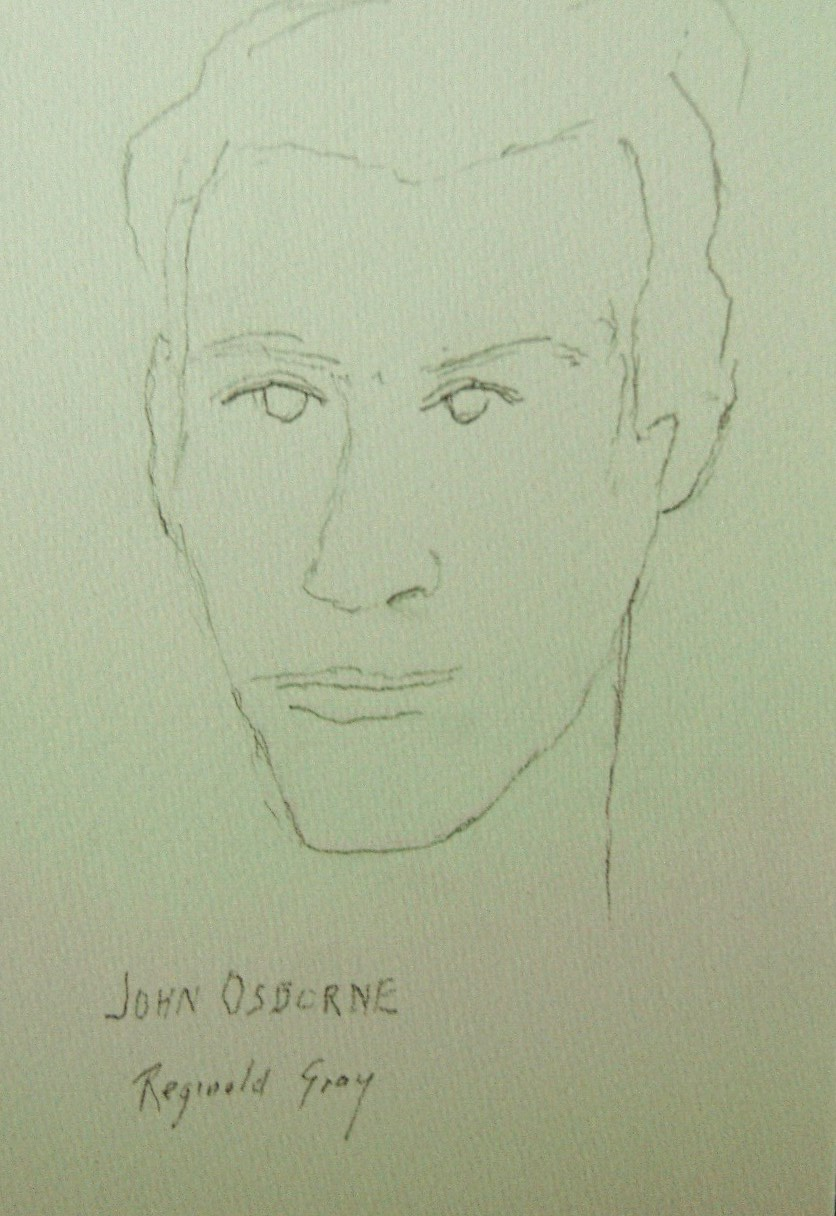
Osborne by Irish artist Reginald Gray, London (1957)

When he first saw Look Back in Anger, Laurence Olivier had a poor opinion of the play. At the time, Olivier was making a film of Rattigan's The Prince and the Showgirl co-starring Marilyn Monroe, and she was accompanied to London by her husband Arthur Miller. Olivier asked the American dramatist what plays he might want to see in London. Based on its title, Miller suggested Osborne's work; Olivier tried to dissuade him, but the playwright was insistent and the two of them saw it together.

Miller found the play revelatory, and they went backstage to meet Osborne. Olivier was impressed by the American's reaction and asked Osborne for a part in his next play. George Devine, artistic director of the Royal Court, sent Olivier the incomplete script of The Entertainer. Olivier eventually took the central role as failing music-hall performer Archie Rice, playing successfully both at the Royal Court and in the West End.

The Entertainer uses the metaphor of the dying music hall tradition and its eclipse by early rock and roll to comment on the declining influence of the British Empire and its eclipse by the increasing influence of the United States, as illustrated during the Suez Crisis of November 1956 which forms the backdrop to the play. The Entertainer found critical acclaim.

Osborne followed The Entertainer with The World of Paul Slickey (1959), a musical that satirizes the tabloid press; the televised documentary play A Subject of Scandal and Concern (1960); and the double bill Plays for England, comprising The Blood of the Bambergs and Under Plain Cover (1962).

Luther, depicting the life of Martin Luther, was first performed in 1961; it transferred to Broadway and won Osborne a Tony Award. Inadmissible Evidence was first performed in 1964. In between these plays, Osborne won an Oscar for his 1963 screenplay adaptation of Tom Jones. His 1965 play, A Patriot for Me, draws on the Austrian Redl case, involving themes of homosexuality and espionage, and helped to end the system of theatrical censorship under the Lord Chamberlain.

Both A Patriot For Me and The Hotel in Amsterdam (1968) won Evening Standard Best Play of the Year awards. The Hotel in Amsterdam features three showbiz couples in a hotel suite, having fled a tyrannical movie producer, referred to as "K.L." Osborne's biographer John Heilpern asserts that "K.L." was meant to represent director and producer Tony Richardson.

=== 1970s and later life ===
John Osborne's plays in the 1970s included West of Suez, starring Ralph Richardson; 1975's The End of Me Old Cigar; and Watch It Come Down, starring Frank Finlay. Theatre historian Phyllis Hartnoll wrote that Osborne's work of this period "failed to enhance his reputation": his fellow playwright Alan Bennett recalled "frozen embarrassment" at the premiere of Watch It Come Down, though Richard Ellmann, reviewing an early performance, noticed unintentional audience laughter.

Perhaps his most harshly received work from this era was A Sense of Detachment (1972), which has no plot and features a scene where an elderly lady recites at length from a hardcore porn catalogue. Part of the play involves actors planted in the audience pretending to protest, though after this began to trigger actual heckling, actress Rachel Kempson leapt into the stalls and assaulted some of the troublemakers in a much publicised incident. A representative review in the Financial Times declared, "This must surely be an end to his career in the theatre".

During that decade Osborne played the role of gangster Cyril Kinnear in Get Carter (1971). Later, he appeared in Tomorrow Never Comes (1978) and Flash Gordon (1980).

Osborne's later public image differed from his 'angry young man' persona of the 1950s. From 1986, Osborne and his wife Helen lived at The Hurst, near Clunton in rural Shropshire. Increasingly his life resembled that of an old-fashioned country gentleman. He wrote a diary for conservative British magazine The Spectator, a publication that when young he had been contemptuous of. He raised money for the local church roof by opening his garden to the public, and threatened to withdraw funding for this unless the vicar restored the Book of Common Prayer (Osborne had returned to the Church of England in about 1974). Ferdinand Mount draws a contrast between this devotion to Anglican ritual and the opening of Look Back in Anger, with Jimmy Porter railing against the sound of church bells. In 2003 the Osbornes' residence was opened as a residential retreat for writers by the Arvon Foundation.

In the last two decades of his life Osborne published two volumes of autobiography, A Better Class of Person (1981) and Almost a Gentleman (1991). Reviewing the first of these books, Alan Bennett wrote, "It is immensely enjoyable, is written with great gusto and Osborne has had better notices for it than for any of his plays since Inadmissible Evidence." A Better Class of Person was filmed by Thames Television in 1985, featuring Eileen Atkins and Alan Howard as his parents, and Gary Capelin and Neil McPherson as Osborne. It was nominated for the Prix Italia.

Osborne's last play was Déjàvu (1992), a sequel to Look Back in Anger. Various of his newspaper and magazine writings appeared in a collection entitled Damn You, England (1994), while his two autobiographical volumes were reissued as Looking Back – Never Explain, Never Apologise (1999).

== Critical responses, idols and effect ==
=== Inspiration ===
Osborne described his childhood home as a place "where books... were almost completely disregarded". One of the role models he identified was not a literary figure but a popular entertainer. Osborne was a great fan of comic Max Miller, and saw parallels between them:

I love him (Max Miller), because he embodied a kind of theatre I admire most. 'Mary from the Dairy' was an overture to the danger that (Max) might go too far. Whenever anyone tells me that a scene or a line in a play of mine goes too far in some way then I know my instinct has been functioning as it should. When such people tell you that a particular passage makes the audience uneasy or restless, then they seem (to me) as cautious and absurd as landladies and girls-who-won't.

He claimed that it was his childhood memories of music hall that inspired The Entertainer, "not, as I was told authoritatively by others, the influence of Bertolt Brecht".

=== Impact ===
Osborne's work transformed British theatre. He helped to make it artistically respected again, throwing off the formal constraints of the former generation, and turning public attention once more to language, theatrical rhetoric, and emotional intensity. As a young man he decided 'it was a beholden duty at all times for me to kick against the pricks'; he saw theatre as a weapon with which ordinary people could break down class barriers. He wanted his plays to be a reminder of real pleasures and real pains. David Hare said in his memorial address:

John Osborne devoted his life to trying to forge some sort of connection between the acuteness of his mind and the extraordinary power of his heart.

Osborne did change the world of theatre, influencing playwrights such as Edward Albee and Mike Leigh. However, work of his kind of authenticity and originality would remain the exception rather than the rule. This did not surprise Osborne; nobody understood the tackiness of the theatre better than the man who had played Hamlet on Hayling Island. In 1992 he was awarded a Lifetime Achievement Award from the Writer's Guild of Great Britain.

== Personal life ==
=== Politics ===
In A Better Class of Person, Osborne describes the emotional appeal that socialism had to him as a schoolboy and how he and his closest friends "all attended the local Labour Party meetings" as youths. He carried these affiliations with him into adult life, alienating fellow commuters and colleagues by regularly bringing a copy of the Daily Worker into the office as a young journalist. Given a platform to express his views in the 1957 anthology Declaration, he took the opportunity to criticize monarchy:

I have called Royalty religion the 'national swill' because it is poisonous... the leader-writers and the bribed gossip mongers have only to rattle their sticks in the royalty bucket for most of their readers to put their heads down in this trough of Queen-worship... My objection to the Royalty symbol is that it is dead; it is the gold filling in a mouthful of decay.

He also protested about "the Christmas Island explosion" and what he perceived as the blindly supportive response of the British media. Osborne joined the CND in 1959, and in the early '60s was a member of the Committee of 100 who engaged in civil disobedience to protest against nuclear weapons.

In 1961, in the aftermath of the Berlin Wall being built, the left-wing magazine Tribune published Osborne's "Letter to My Fellow Countrymen", addressing those politicians the author considered responsible for nuclear proliferation:

My favourite fantasy is four minutes or so non-commercial viewing as you fry in your democratically elected hot seats... I would willingly watch you all die for the West... you could all go ahead and die for Berlin, for Democracy, to keep out the red hordes or whatever you like... damn you, England. You're rotting now, and quite soon you'll disappear... I write this from another country, with murder in my brain and a knife carried in my heart for every one of you. I am not alone. If WE had just the ultimate decency and courage, we would strike at you - now, before you blaspheme the world in our name. There is nothing I should not give for your blood on my head.

The letter caused controversy. Conservative journalist Peregrine Worsthorne expressed concern about its "murderous language" and the possibility that the "resentment that John Osborne so virulently articulated" might be shared by many others, while the trade unionist Jack Jones commented, "every true Socialist should roar with applause".

In his public letter, however, Osborne had denounced Labour leader Hugh Gaitskell as well as Conservative Prime Minister Harold Macmillan. The following year, he told the Daily Herald that he would not be voting Labour at the next election, adding "Barrenness is preferable to rape by one of two monsters." His play Time Present (1968) contains a mocking caricature of a female Labour MP. Critics saw a conservative attitude to empire reflected in West of Suez, and later in the 1970s he expressed support for Enoch Powell. In the words of Osborne's biographer Michael Ratcliffe, "he drifted to the libertarian, unorganized right"; even his friend David Hare acknowledged that he passed "from passion to prejudice. He was forced back into a position which, finally, for most writers is undignified and unproductive: the pretence that the past is always, necessarily, superior to the present". Several commentators have argued that a conservative and nostalgic strain was apparent in Osborne's work from an early stage. As early as 1957, Kenneth Tynan had noticed "a deeply submerged nostalgia" for Britain's pre-WW1 past in The Entertainer.

=== Relationships ===
Osborne had many affairs and frequently mistreated his wives and lovers. He was married five times, all except the last being unhappy unions. The first four were marred by frequent affairs and mistreatment of his partners. He outlived three of his wives, being survived only by the first and the last, both of whom have since died. His final marriage, from 1978 until his death, was to the journalist Helen Dawson.

==== Pamela Lane (1951–57) ====
In A Better Class of Person, Osborne describes feeling an immediate and intense attraction towards his first wife, Pamela Lane. The pair were both members of an acting troupe in Bridgwater.

She had just recently shorn her hair down to a defiant auburn stubble and I was impressed by the hostility she had created by this self-isolating act. I was unable to take my eyes from her hair, her huge green eyes which must mock or plead affection, preferably both, at least… She startled and confused me… There was no calculation in my instant obsession.

Though Alison Porter in Look Back in Anger was based on Pamela, Osborne describes Lane's respectable middle-class parents – her father a successful draper, her mother of a family of minor rural gentry – as "much coarser", and how at one point they hired a private detective to follow him after a fellow actor was seen 'fumbling' with his knee in a tea shop.

Lane and Osborne married in nearby Wells and then left Bridgwater the following Sunday amidst an uneasy truce with Lane's parents (Osborne's hated mother was not aware of the union until the couple were divorcing), spending their first night as a married couple together in the Cromwell Road in London.

The two lived a fairly itinerant and reasonably happy married existence at first, living at a number of places around London and finding work there at first, then touring, staying in Kidderminster in Osborne's case. While Lane's acting career flourished in Derby, Osborne's struggled, and she began an affair with Joe Selby, a dental surgeon.

Osborne spent much of the next two years before their divorce hoping they would reconcile. In 1956, after the opening of Look Back in Anger, Osborne met Lane at the railway station in York, where she told Osborne of her recent abortion and enquired after his relationship with Mary Ure. In April 1957, Osborne was granted a divorce from Lane, on the grounds of his adultery. It later emerged that in the 1980s, Lane and Osborne corresponded frequently and met in secret until he became angered by her request for a loan.

==== Mary Ure (1957–1963) ====
Osborne began a relationship with Ure shortly after meeting her when she was cast as Alison in Look Back in Anger in 1956, while he was married to Pamela Lane. The affair swiftly progressed; and the two moved in together in Woodfall Road, Chelsea, London. He wrote later:

Mary was one of those unguarded souls who can make themselves understood by penguins or the wildest dervishes .. I was not in love. There was fondness and pleasure, but no groping expectations, just a feeling of fleeting heart's ease. For the present we were both content enough.

Eventually, Osborne became jealous and somewhat contemptuous of Ure's stable family background and her relationship with family. He also began to lose regard for her acting abilities.

I had stopped concealing from myself, if I ever had, that Mary was not much of an actress. She had a rather harsh voice and a tiny range.

There was infidelity on both sides; and, after an affair with Robert Webber, Ure eventually left Osborne for the actor and novelist Robert Shaw.

Osborne described visiting her after she had left him and having sex with her while she was pregnant with the first of four children she would bear to Shaw. Of their divorce, Osborne wrote of being surprised that she repeatedly refused to return to him treasured postcards drawn for him by his father, but is circumspect about her early death in 1975: "Destiny dragged her so pointlessly from a life better contained by the softly lapping waters of the Clyde."

==== Penelope Gilliatt (1963–68) ====
Osborne met his third wife, writer Penelope Gilliatt, initially through social connections, and then through an interview she conducted with him:

It was not so much chastity that troubled me, but the withdrawal of feminine intimacy. And now, here I was, giving a routine interview to a young, animated woman, seemingly very informed and quick to laugh… I was already engaged in the prospect of mild and easy flirtation. I hadn't marked Penelope down in any appraising way as a future sportive fancy, but I had always been addicted to flirtation as a game worth playing for itself.

One great attraction Penelope held for Osborne was her red hair: "Penelope was a redhead, as was Pamela... I took red hair to be the mantle of goddesses". Despite her being married and Osborne knowing her husband, Gilliatt set out to seduce Osborne and succeeded in doing so. "Penelope's behaviour and my own during the weeks that followed were probably grotesquely indefensible", he wrote.

Osborne and Gilliatt were together for seven years, five of which they spent married, and became the parents of his only biological child, their daughter Nolan. Osborne had an abusive relationship with his daughter and cast her out of his house when she was 17; they never spoke again. Osborne and Gilliatt's marriage suffered through what Osborne perceived to be an unnecessary obsession on her part with her work, writing film reviews for The Observer. "I tried to point out that it seemed an inordinate amount of time and effort to expend on a thousand-word review to be read by a few thousand film addicts and forgotten almost at once." Osborne wanted Gilliatt to give up her multiple careers and move with him to a country house where she would tend his needs. Osborne had put a refrigerator in the couple's bedroom and filled it with champagne to alleviate his night terrors. Both began to have struggles with alcoholism.

He treated with contempt what he saw as Gilliatt's growing pretentiousness. "She was to become increasingly obsessed with fripperies and titles … She took to calling herself 'Professor Gilliatt'." Strains in the marriage led to Osborne conducting numerous affairs behind her back, including one with his future wife, Jill Bennett.

==== Jill Bennett (1968–1977) ====
Osborne had a turbulent nine-year marriage to the actress Jill Bennett. Their marriage degenerated into mutual abuse with Bennett insulting Osborne, calling him impotent and homosexual in public as early as 1971. Osborne showed similar cruelty towards her, breaching a court order by harassing her with abusive messages after their divorce. Bennett committed suicide in 1990 (having expressed suicidal thoughts for decades): some have blamed this on Osborne's treatment of her. He said of Bennett, "She was the most evil woman I have come across", and showed open contempt for her suicide.

She was a woman so demoniacally possessed by Avarice that she died of it… This final, fumbled gesture, after a lifetime of glad-rags borrowings, theft and plagiarism, must have been one of the few original or spontaneous gestures in her loveless life.

He concluded by stating that his only regret was that he could not "look down upon her open coffin and, like that bird in the Book of Tobit, drop a good, large mess in her eye." Reviewing Almost a Gentleman, which contains this passage, Hilary Mantel commented, "the pious reader may wish to pray, the queasy reader vomit, the prudent reviewer consult the libel laws" (though she did speculate about Osborne's mental health). Michael Billington called the attack on Bennett a "vicious assault", though he added, "he must have once loved her a lot to have hated her so much".

==== Helen Dawson (1978–1994) ====
Helen Dawson (1939–2004) was a former arts journalist and critic for The Observer. This final marriage of Osborne's, which lasted until his death, seems to have been happier than any of his prior marriages. Until her death in 2004, Dawson worked to preserve and promote Osborne's legacy.

Osborne died deeply in debt; his final word to Dawson was: "Sorry". After her death in 2004, Dawson was buried next to Osborne.

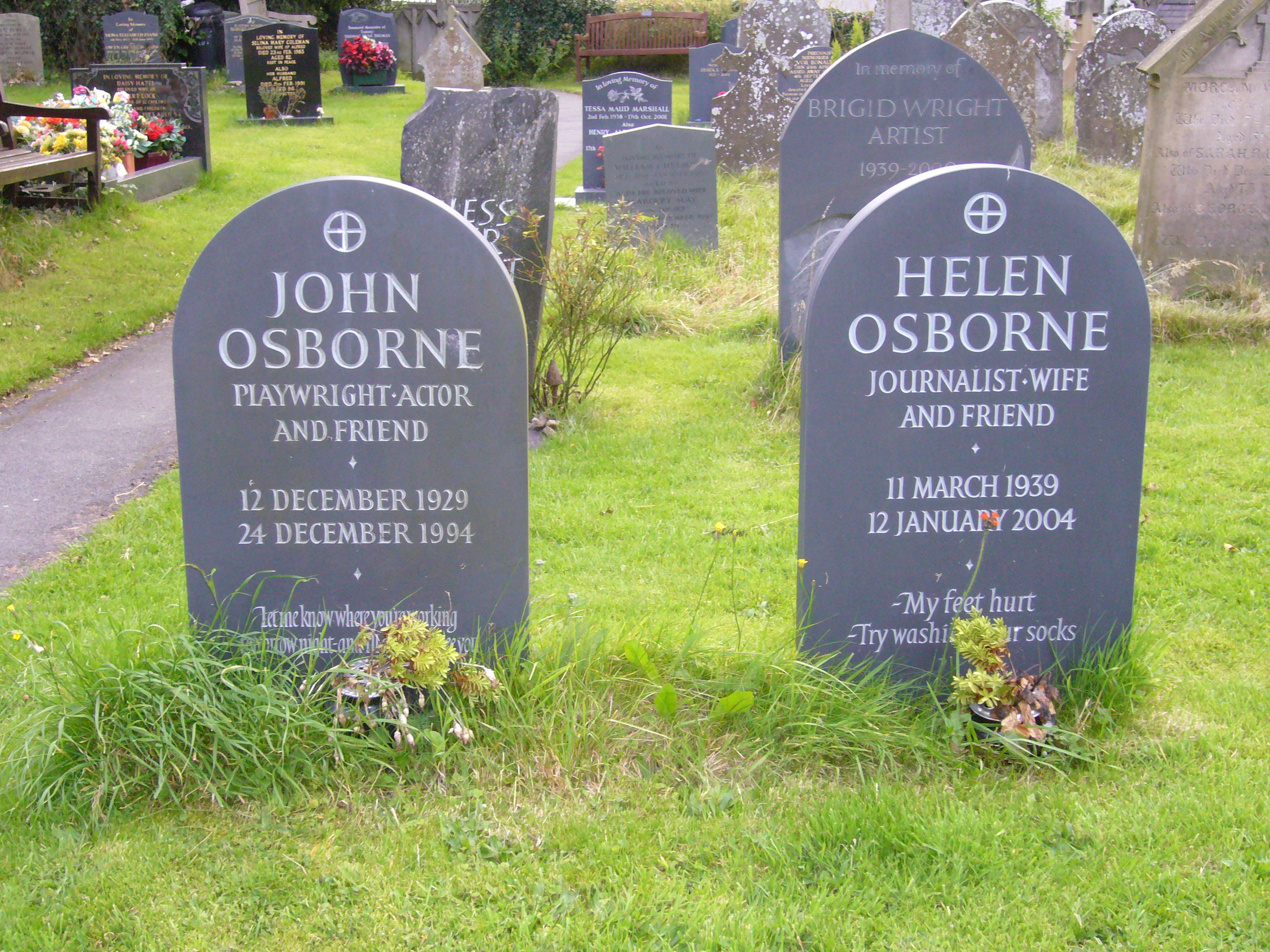
Graves of Osborne and his fifth wife in Clun churchyard

=== Vegetarianism ===
Around the time of Look Back in Anger, Osborne was a vegetarian, something which was considered unusual at the time. In Almost a Gentleman he gives some insight into this lifestyle choice:

My own vegetarianism had been prompted by self-interest. I wanted to confound my pitted complexion, implacable daily headaches, throbbing glands, dish-cloth hair and dandruff. That my appearance had marginally improved (though not the headaches) was no doubt due a little to less toxic input… Meat could be equated with inner squalor. Vegetarianism might banish that, too.

== Death ==
After a serious liver crisis in 1987 Osborne became diabetic, injecting insulin twice a day. He died on 24 December 1994 at the age of 65 from complications of diabetes at The Hurst, his home in Clunton, near Craven Arms, Shropshire. He is buried in St George's churchyard, Clun, Shropshire. His last wife, Helen Dawson, who died in 2004, is buried next to him.

== Archive ==
Osborne began placing his papers at the Harry Ransom Center at the University of Texas in Austin in the 1960s, with additions made throughout his life and by relatives in the years after his death. The primary archive is over 50 boxes and includes typescripts and manuscripts for all of his works, correspondence, newspaper and magazine articles, scrapbooks, posters, programmes, and business documents.

In 2008, the Ransom Center purchased an additional archive of over 30 boxes that had been held by Helen Dawson Osborne. While largely focusing on the latter years of Osborne's life, the collection also includes a series of notebooks that he had kept separately from his original archive.

== Works ==
Title	Type	Year	Notes
The Devil Inside Him	Theatre	1950	with Stella Linden
The Great Bear	Theatre	1951	blank verse, never produced
Personal Enemy	Theatre	1955	with Anthony Creighton
Look Back in Anger	Theatre	1956	
The Entertainer	Theatre	1957	
Epitaph for George Dillon	Theatre	1958	with Anthony Creighton
The World Of Paul Slickey	Theatre	1959	
A Subject of Scandal and Concern	TV	1960	
Luther	Theatre	1961	
The Blood of the Bambergs	Theatre	1962	
Under Plain Cover	Theatre	1962	
Tom Jones	Screenplay	1963	
Inadmissible Evidence	Theatre	1964	
A Patriot for Me	Theatre	1965	
A Bond Honoured	Theatre	1966	One-act adaptation of Lope de Vega's La fianza satisfecha
The Hotel in Amsterdam	Theatre	1968	
Time Present	Theatre	1968	
The Charge of the Light Brigade	Screenplay	1968	Uncredited
Inadmissible Evidence	Screenplay	1968	Adaptation of his play
The Right Prospectus	TV	1970	
West of Suez	Theatre	1971	
A Sense of Detachment	Theatre	1972	
The Gift of Friendship	TV	1972	
Hedda Gabler	Theatre	1972	Ibsen adaptation
A Place Calling Itself Rome	Theatre	1973	Coriolanus adaptation, unproduced
Ms, Or Jill And Jack	TV	1974	
The End of Me Old Cigar	Theatre	1975	
The Picture Of Dorian Gray	Theatre	1975	Wilde adaptation
Almost A Vision	TV	1976	
Watch It Come Down	Theatre	1976	
Try A Little Tenderness	Theatre	1978	unproduced
Very Like A Whale	TV	1980	
You're Not Watching Me, Mummy	TV	1980	
A Better Class of Person	Book	1981	autobiography volume I
A Better Class of Person	TV	1985	TV version of the above.
God Rot Tunbridge Wells!	TV	1985	
The Father	Theatre	1989	Strindberg adaptation
Almost a Gentleman	Book	1991	autobiography volume II
Déjàvu	Theatre	1992	
England, My England	TV	1995	Osborne's script was unfinished at his death and completed by Charles Wood.

=== Filmography ===
Title	Year	Role	Notes
First Love	1970	Maidanov	
The Chairman's Wife	1971	Bernard Howe	
Get Carter	1971	Cyril Kinnear	
Tomorrow Never Comes	1978	Lyne	
Flash Gordon	1980	Arborian Priest	
