= John Heilpern =

British journalist (1942–2021)

John David Heilpern (8 April 1942 – 7 January 2021) was a British theatre critic, journalist, and author who worked both in the United Kingdom and the United States. He was a contributing editor to Vanity Fair (where he wrote the "Out To Lunch" feature) and longtime drama critic for the New York Observer.

== Biography ==
Heilpern, the son of a bookmaker, was born in Manchester, England, and educated at Stand Grammar School in Whitefield (which he attended at the same time as the novelist Howard Jacobson) and Oxford University. He began his career at The Observer of London, where his interviews with numerous cultural figures (including Graham Greene, Rudolf Nureyev, Henry Moore, Artur Rubinstein, John Gielgud and Ralph Richardson) received a British Press Award.

He also worked as Peter Hall's assistant director on Tamburlaine at the National Theatre in 1976, and when he went to live in New York in 1980, he subsequently worked on Broadway as a librettist for Michael Bennett (of A Chorus Line).

Heilpern is perhaps best known for his 1977 book Conference of the Birds: The Story of Peter Brook in Africa. It tells the story of a historic journey made by Peter Brook and an international troupe of actors (including the young Helen Mirren) from Algiers across the Sahara Desert and then through West Africa, in search of a new form of theatre. The current paperback edition of Conference of the Birds, re-issued in America by Routledge, was described by The Sunday Telegraph as "one of the best books about theatre ever written".

Among his other books, How Good Is David Mamet, Anyway? is a collection of theatre essays and reviews, and John Osborne - The Many Lives of the Angry Young Man, is the authorized biography of the iconic playwright who revolutionized British theatre. First published in the UK by Chatto & Windus in 2006 under the title A Patriot for Us, the Osborne biography received the award for Best Theatre Book of the Year. On its publication in the US by Knopf in 2007, The New Yorker described it as "compelling", The Wall Street Journal as "masterful", and The Philadelphia Inquirer as "a model of what a literary biography ought to be". The Wall Street Journal named it one its Ten Best Books of the Year.

Heilpern died from lung cancer in New York City on 7 January 2021, aged 78.

== Bibliography ==
- Heilpern, John (1977). Conference of the birds: the story of Peter Brook in Africa. London: Faber and Faber.
- — (2000). How good is David Mamet, anyway? Writings on theater and why it matters. New York: Routledge.
- — (December 2012). "Out to lunch with Sir Ian McKellen". Vanity Fair. Vol. 628. p. 106.
- — (June 2013). "Out to lunch with Eddie Izzard". Vanity Fair. Vol. 634. p. 34.
