= Look Back in Anger =

1956 play by John Osborne

- Poster for 1957 production
- Original language: English
- Written by: John Osborne
- Characters: Jimmy Porter; Alison Porter; Cliff Lewis; Helena Charles; Colonel Redfern
- Subject: British class system, marriage, misogyny
- Genre: realism
- Setting: A single-room flat, English Midlands, 1950s

Premiere
- Date: 8 May 1956
- Place: Royal Court Theatre, London

Look Back in Anger (1956) is a realist play written by John Osborne. It focuses on the life and marital struggles of an intelligent and educated but disaffected young man of working-class origin, Jimmy Porter, and his equally competent yet impassive upper-middle-class wife Alison. The supporting characters include Cliff Lewis, an amiable Welsh lodger who attempts to keep the peace; and Helena Charles, Alison's snobbish friend.

Osborne drew inspiration from his personal life and failing marriage with Pamela Lane while writing Look Back in Anger, which was his first successful outing as a playwright. The play spawned the term "angry young men" to describe Osborne and those of his generation who employed the harshness of realism in the theatre in contrast to the more escapist theatre that characterised the previous generation. This harsh realism has led to Look Back in Anger being considered one of the first examples of kitchen sink drama in theatre.

The play was received favourably in the theatre community, becoming an enormous commercial success, transferring to the West End and Broadway, and even touring to Moscow. It is credited with turning Osborne from a struggling playwright into a wealthy and famous personality, and also won him the Evening Standard Drama Award as the most promising playwright of 1956. The play was adapted into a motion picture of the same name by Tony Richardson, starring Richard Burton and Mary Ure, which was released in 1959. Film production credited circa 1958.

== Synopsis ==
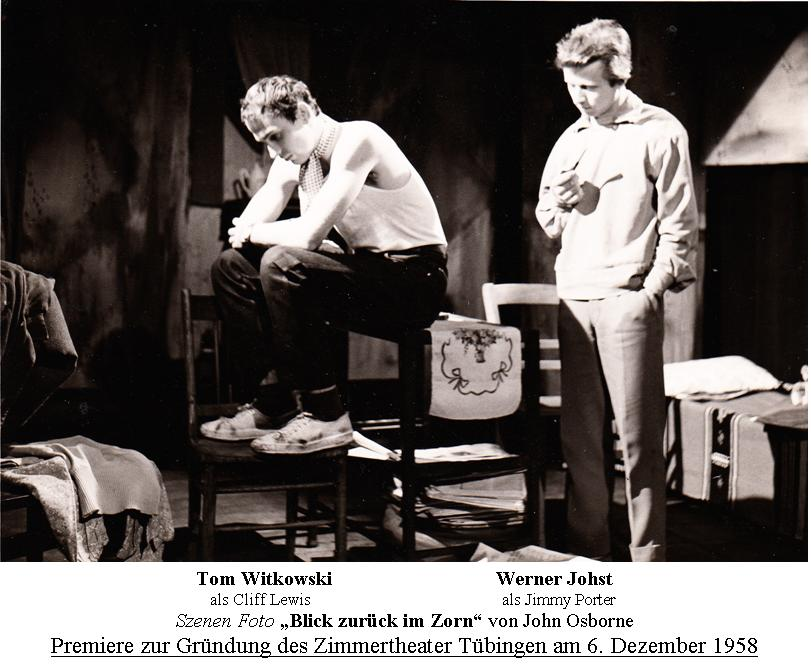
Photo from the German version (Blick zurück im Zorn), 1958

=== Act 1 ===
Act 1 opens on a dismal April Sunday afternoon in Jimmy and Alison's cramped attic in the Midlands. Jimmy and Cliff are reading the Sunday papers, plus the radical weekly, "price ninepence, obtainable at any bookstall" as Jimmy snaps, claiming it from Cliff. This is a reference to the New Statesman, and in the context of the period would have instantly signalled the pair's political preference to the audience. Alison is attempting to do the week's ironing and is only half listening as Jimmy and Cliff engage in the expository dialogue.

It becomes apparent that there is a huge social gulf between Jimmy and Alison. Her family is upper-middle-class military, while Jimmy belongs to the working class. He had to fight hard against her family's disapproval to win her. "Alison's mummy and I took one look at each other, and from then on the age of chivalry was dead," he explains. We also learn that the sole family income is derived from a sweets confectionery stall in the local market—an enterprise that is surely well beneath Jimmy's education, let alone Alison's "station in life".

As Act 1 progresses, Jimmy becomes more and more vituperative, transferring his contempt for Alison's family onto her personally, calling her "pusillanimous" and generally belittling her to Cliff. (Some actors play this scene as though Jimmy thinks everything is just a joke, while others play it as though he really is excoriating her.) The tirade ends with physical horseplay, resulting in the ironing board overturning and Alison's arm getting burned. Jimmy exits to play his trumpet off stage.

Alison, alone with Cliff, confides that she's accidentally pregnant and can't quite bring herself to tell Jimmy. Cliff urges her to tell him. When Jimmy returns, Alison announces that her actress friend Helena Charles is coming to stay; Jimmy despises Helena even more than Alison, he flies into a rage.

=== Act 2 ===
Act 2 opens on another Sunday afternoon, with Helena and Alison making lunch. In a two-handed scene, Alison says that she decided to marry Jimmy because of her own minor rebellion against her upbringing and her admiration for Jimmy's campaigns against the dereliction of life in postwar England. She describes Jimmy to Helena as a "knight in shining armour". Helena says, firmly, "You've got to fight him".

Jimmy enters, and the tirade continues. If his Act 1 material could be played as a joke, there's no doubt about the intentional viciousness of his attacks on Helena. When the women put on hats and declare that they are going to church, Jimmy's sense of betrayal peaks. When he leaves to take an urgent phone call, Helena announces that she has forced the issue. She has sent a telegram to Alison's parents asking them to come and "rescue" her. Alison is stunned but agrees that she will go.

The next evening, Alison's father, Colonel Redfern, comes to collect her to take her back to her family home. The playwright allows the Colonel to come across as quite a sympathetic character, albeit totally out of touch with the modern world, as he himself admits. "You're hurt because everything's changed", Alison tells him, "and Jimmy's hurt because everything's stayed the same". Helena arrives to say goodbye, intending to leave very soon herself. Alison is surprised that Helena is staying on for another day, but she leaves, giving Cliff a note for Jimmy. Cliff in turn hands it to Helena and leaves, saying "I hope he rams it up your nostrils".

Almost immediately, Jimmy bursts in. His contempt at finding a "goodbye" note makes him turn on Helena again, warning her to keep out of his way until she leaves. Helena tells him that Alison is expecting a baby, and Jimmy admits grudgingly that he's taken aback. However, his tirade continues. They first come to physical blows, and then as the Act 2 curtain falls, Jimmy and Helena are kissing passionately and falling on the bed.

=== Act 3 ===
Act 3 opens as a deliberate replay of Act 1, but this time with Helena at the ironing-board wearing Jimmy's Act 1 red shirt. Months have passed. Jimmy is notably more pleasant to Helena than he was to Alison in Act 1. She actually laughs at his jokes, and the three of them (Jimmy, Cliff, and Helena) get into a music hall comedy routine that obviously is not improvised. Cliff announces that he's decided to strike out on his own. As Jimmy leaves the room to get ready for a final night out for the three of them, he opens the door to find Alison, looking like death. He snaps over his shoulder "Friend of yours to see you" and abruptly leaves.

Alison explains to Helena that she lost the baby (one of Jimmy's cruellest speeches in Act 1 expressed the wish that Alison would conceive a child and lose it). The two women are reconciled, but Helena realises that what she's done is immoral and she in turn decides to leave. She summons Jimmy to hear her decision and he lets her go with a sarcastic farewell.

The play ends with a sentimental reconciliation between Jimmy and Alison. They revive an old game they used to play, pretending to be bears and squirrels, and seem to be in a state of truce.

== Background of the play ==
Written in 17 days in a deck chair on Morecambe Pier, Look Back in Anger was a strongly autobiographical piece based on Osborne's unhappy marriage to actress Pamela Lane and their life in cramped accommodation in Derby. It also draws from Osborne's earlier life; for example, the wrenching speech of witnessing a loved one's death was a replay of the death of his father, Thomas.

What it is best remembered for, though, are Jimmy's tirades. Some of these are directed against generalised British middle-class smugness in the post-atomic world. Many are directed against the female characters, a very distinct echo of Osborne's uneasiness with women, including his mother, Nellie Beatrice, whom he describes in his autobiography A Better Class of Person as "hypocritical, self-absorbed, calculating and indifferent". Madeline, the lost love Jimmy pines for, is based on Stella Linden, the older rep-company actress who first encouraged Osborne to write. After the first production in London, Osborne began a relationship with Mary Ure, who played Alison; he divorced his first wife (of five years) Pamela Lane to marry Ure in 1957.

== Cast and characters ==
Character	West End debut	Broadway debut	West End revival	Off-Broadway revival
Character	1956	1957	1989	2012
Jimmy Porter	Kenneth Haigh	Kenneth Haigh	Kenneth Branagh	Matthew Rhys
Alison Porter	Mary Ure	Mary Ure	Emma Thompson	Sarah Goldberg
Cliff Lewis	Alan Bates	Alan Bates	Gerald Horan	Adam Driver
Helena Charles	Helena Hughes	Vivienne Drummond	Siobhan Redmond	Charlotte Parry
Colonel Redfern	John Welsh	John Welsh	Edward Jewesbury	N/A

Characters:

- Jimmy Porter - is the "angry young man of the play" who is at odds with the British upper class.
- Alison Porter - Jimmy's complacent yet unsatisfied wife.
- Cliff Lewis - easy going working class friend and roommate to Jimmy and Allison.
- Helena Charles - An upper class friend who has an affair with Jimmy.
- Colonel Redfern - Alison's father, a British colonel formerly stationed in India.

== Production ==
The play was premiered at London's Royal Court Theatre, on 8 May 1956 by the English Stage Company under the direction of Tony Richardson, setting by Alan Tagg, and music for songs by Tom Eastwood. The press release called the author an "angry young man", a phrase that came to represent a new movement in 1950s British theatre. Audiences supposedly gasped at the sight of an ironing board on a London stage.

The cast was as follows: Kenneth Haigh (Jimmy), Alan Bates (Cliff), Mary Ure (Alison), Helena Hughes (Helena Charles) and John Welsh (Colonel Redfern). The following year, the production moved to Broadway under producer David Merrick and director Tony Richardson. Retaining the original cast but starring Vivienne Drummond as Helena, it received three Tony Award nominations, including for Best Play and Best Dramatic Actress for Ure.

== Critical reception ==
At the time of production reviews of Look Back in Anger were deeply negative. Kenneth Tynan and Harold Hobson were among the few critics to praise it, and they now are regarded among the more influential critics of the time.

For example, on BBC Radio's The Critics, Ivor Brown began his review by describing the play's setting—a one-room flat in the Midlands—as "unspeakably dirty and squalid" such that it was difficult for him to "believe that a colonel's daughter, brought up with some standards", would have lived in it. He expressed anger at having watched something that "wasted [his] time". The Daily Mail's Cecil Wilson wrote that the beauty of Mary Ure was "frittered away" on a pathetic wife, who, "judging by the time she spends ironing, seems to have taken on the nation's laundry". Indeed, Alison, Ure's character, irons during Act One, makes lunch in Act Two, and leaves the ironing to her rival in Act Three.

On the other hand, Kenneth Tynan wrote that he "could not love anyone who did not wish to see Look Back in Anger", describing the play as a "minor miracle" containing "all the qualities...one had despaired of ever seeing on the stage—the drift towards anarchy, the instinctive leftishness, the automatic rejection of "official" attitudes, the surrealist sense of humour (e.g., Jimmy describes an effeminate male friend as a 'female Emily Brontë'), the casual promiscuity, the sense of lacking a crusade worth fighting for and, underlying all these, the determination that no one who dies shall go unmourned." Harold Hobson was also quick to recognise the importance of the play "as a landmark of British theatre". He praised Osborne for the play, despite the fact that "blinkers still obscure his vision".

Alan Sillitoe, author of Saturday Night and Sunday Morning and The Loneliness of the Long Distance Runner (both of which are also part of the "angry young men" movement), wrote that Osborne "didn't contribute to British theatre, he set off a landmine and blew most of it up".

== Other notable productions ==
Bates reprised his role as Cliff Lewis, alongside Drummond as Helena Charles, on ITV's Play of the Week in 1956, shortly after the theatrical production premiered. Richard Pasco and Doreen Aris assumed the roles of Jimmy and Alison Porter, respectively. It was co-directed by Richardson and Silvio Narizzano.

The Renaissance Theatre Company's August 1989 production at the Lyric Theatre, London was directed by Judi Dench, with Kenneth Branagh and Emma Thompson. A television version of the production was broadcast in Britain in December of that year. In 1995, Greg Hersov directed a production at the Royal Exchange, Manchester with Michael Sheen as Jimmy, Claire Skinner as Alison, Dominic Rowan as Cliff, and Hermione Norris as Helena. Hersov directed a second production in 1999, again starring Sheen, at the Royal National Theatre in London.

In 2012, it was directed by Sam Gold off-Broadway starring Matthew Rhys, Adam Driver, and Sarah Goldberg at the Roundabout Theatre Company. A 2024 production was directed by Atri Banerjee, and starred Billy Howle as Jimmy, Ellora Torchia as Alison, Morfydd Clark as Helena, Iwan Davies as Cliff and Deka Walmsley as Col Redfern at the Almeida Theatre.

== Sequel ==
In 1989 Osborne wrote a sequel to the play titled Déjàvu, which was first produced in 1992. Déjàvu depicted Jimmy Porter, now known as J.P., in middle age, living with his daughter Alison. He rants about the state of the country to his old friend Cliff, while his Alison irons, just as her mother had done in Look Back. The play was not a commercial success, closing after seven weeks. It was Osborne's last play.

== Film adaptations ==
- A British film adaptation starring Richard Burton, Claire Bloom, and Mary Ure and directed by Tony Richardson was made in 1958 and released in 1959. The screenplay was written by the play's author, John Osborne, with Nigel Kneale. Interior set design was by Loudon Sainthill. The film was nominated in four categories in the 1959 BAFTA Awards, including a Best Actor nomination for Richard Burton, but it did not win any of them. In the United States, the film failed at the box office.
- A version released in 1980 was directed by Lindsay Anderson and David Hugh Jones.
- In December 1989 Judi Dench's stage direction of the play from earlier in the year was formed by her into a TV production that starred Kenneth Branagh and Emma Thompson.

== Radio adaptations ==
- A radio dramatisation starring David Tennant as Jimmy Porter and Ian McKellen as the Colonel, and directed by Richard Wilson, was broadcast by the BBC on 30 April 2016.

== In popular culture ==
Look Back in Anger's turtleneck sweater, and wife ironing while wearing a slip, became symbols that both represented the Angry Young Men movement and which others satirised.

=== Media ===
- An episode of the BBC radio comedy series Hancock's Half Hour paid tribute to Osborne's play in "The East Cheam Drama Festival" (1958). The episode features the regular cast spoofing a number of theatrical genres, with Look Back in Anger recast as "Look Back in Hunger—a new play by the Hungry Young Man, Mr. John Eastbourne". Scriptwriters Alan Simpson and Ray Galton mimic several elements of Osborne's play, from Jimmy's railing against the iniquities of modern life to the values of middle-class bourgeois life. The episode "Sunday Afternoon at Home" (1958) begins with a striking similarity to the opening of Osborne's play, with Hancock and Sid James sitting reading the papers and complaining there's nothing to do.
- SCTV (season 4, episode 2) parodied the play and its genre with "Look Back in a Bloody Rage" as an entrant in a British film festival focused on angry young men.
- "Ed Wood: Look Back in Angora", a 1994 documentary about Ed Wood, a B-movie director, released by Rhino Home Video. The cross-dressing Wood often wore an angora sweater and angora fabric is featured in many of his films.
- In Studio 60 on the Sunset Strip, an American television series by Aaron Sorkin, the character Andy Mackinaw translates Look Back in Anger into Dutch.
- "Look Back in Annoyance" is the title of a retrospective episode of Daria, an animated television series.
- Jimmy Shive-Overly, one of the leads in the FX series You're the Worst, is named after Jimmy.

=== Music ===
- Jimmy Porter appears as the protagonist - older, increasingly feeble, but still angry - in The Albion Band's "Ash on an Old Man's Sleeve," from their 1989 album Give Me a Saddle I'll Trade You a Car.
- "Look Back in Anger" is a song by British singer David Bowie from his 1979 album Lodger, but there is no connection to the play, only a shared title.
- "Look Back in Anger" is a song by British rock group Television Personalities from their first album ...And Don't the Kids Just Love It (1981).
- "Don't Look Back in Anger" is a song by British rock group Oasis from their album (What's the Story) Morning Glory?.

== Awards and nominations ==
=== Original Broadway production ===
Year	Award	Category	Nominee	Result
1958	Tony Award	Best Play		Nominated
1958	Tony Award	Best Actress in a Play	Mary Ure	Nominated
1958	Tony Award	Best Costume Design	Motley	Nominated

== See also ==
- Look Back in Anger (1959 film)
