= Ride of the Valkyrie (1967 film) =

1967 British film by Peter Brook

- Directed by: Peter Brook
- Screenplay by: Peter Brook
- Produced by: Lindsay Anderson; Oscar Lewenstein
- Starring: Zero Mostel; Frank Thornton; Julia Foster
- Cinematography: David Watkin
- Edited by: Marlene Fletcher
- Music by: Howard Blake
- Production companies: Woodfall Film Productions; Holly Productions
- Distributed by: United Artists
- Release date: 1967
- Running time: 14 minutes
- Country: United Kingdom
- Language: English

Ride of the Valkyrie is a 1967 British short comedy film directed and written by Peter Brook and starring Julia Foster, Zero Mostel, and Frank Thornton.

== Plot ==
An opera singer, dressed in full costume and dress, must navigate through the busy city streets to get to the theatre in time for his performance in Wagner's Ride of the Valkyries.

== Cast ==
- Zero Mostel
- Julia Foster
- Frank Thornton

== Production history ==
It was originally commissioned by producer Oscar Lewenstein, then a director of Woodfall, as one third of a 'portmanteau' feature entitled Red, White and Zero, with sections supplied by Lindsay Anderson, Tony Richardson and Karel Reisz

Reisz dropped out with his section becoming Brook's Ride of the Valkyrie. The two other planned sections of the film developed into what became Richardson's Red and Blue and Anderson's The White Bus. Of these, only The White Bus received a theatrical release in the UK.
