= Red, White and Zero =

1967 British film by Peter Brook, Lindsay Anderson, Tony Richardson

- DVD cover
- Directed by: Peter Brook (Ride of the Valkyrie); Lindsay Anderson (The White Bus); Tony Richardson (Red and Blue)
- Screenplay by: Peter Brook (Ride of the Valkyrie); Shelagh Delaney (The White Bus); Tony Richardson and Julian More (Red and Blue)
- Produced by: Lindsay Anderson; Oscar Lewenstein
- Starring: Zero Mostel (Ride of the Valkyrie); Patricia Healey (The White Bus); Vanessa Redgrave (Red and Blue)
- Cinematography: David Watkin (Ride of the Valkyrie); Miroslav Ondricek (The White Bus); Billy Williams (Red and Blue)
- Edited by: Marlene Fletcher (Ride of the Valkyrie); Kevin Brownlow (The White Bus, Red and Blue)
- Music by: Howard Blake (Ride of the Valkyrie); Misha Donat (The White Bus); Stanley Black and Monty Norman (Red and Blue)
- Production companies: Woodfall Film Productions; Holly Productions
- Distributed by: United Artists
- Release date: 1967
- Running time: 98 minutes (Ride of the Valkyrie – 14 minutes, The White Bus – 46 minutes, Red and Blue – 36 minutes)
- Country: United Kingdom
- Language: English

Red, White and Zero is a 1967 British anthology film made by Woodfall Film Productions. It consists of three segments, directed by Peter Brook, Lindsay Anderson and Tony Richardson.

== Plot ==
The film is split into three sections of the following stories.

=== Ride of the Valkyrie ===
An opera singer, dressed in full costume and dress, must navigate through the busy city streets to get to the theater in time for his performance.

- Zero Mostel
- Julia Foster
- Frank Thornton

=== The White Bus ===
The main character, only referred to as 'the girl' leaves London, goes north on a train full of football fans and takes a trip in a white double-decker bus in an unnamed city she is visiting, although it is clearly based on Manchester, Delaney was born and grew up in nearby Salford. The Mayor, a local businessman, and the council's ceremonial macebearer happen also to be taking the trip while they show the city to visiting foreigners.

- Patricia Healey as the girl
- Arthur Lowe as the mayor
- John Sharp as the macebearer
- Julie Perry as the conductress
- Stephen Moore as young man
- Victor Henry as transistorite
- John Savident, Fanny Carby, Malcolm Taylor, Alan O'Keeffe as supporters
- Anthony Hopkins as Brechtian
- Jeanne Watts, Eddie King as fish shop couple
- Barry Evans as boy
- Penny Ryder as girl
- Dennis Alaba Peters as Mr. Wombe

=== Red and Blue ===
Jacky, an English cabaret singer goes to Paris for a nightclub engagement, where the romantic image of her songs is very different from the reality of her solitary life. Songs are by Serge Rezvani.

- Vanessa Redgrave as Jacky
- John Bird as man on train
- Gary Raymond as songwriter
- Michael York as acrobat
- Douglas Fairbanks, Jr. as millionaire

== Production history ==
It was originally commissioned by producer Oscar Lewenstein, then a director of Woodfall, with sections supplied by Lindsay Anderson, Tony Richardson and Karel Reisz. When Reisz's planned segment evolved into the feature-length Morgan: A Suitable Case for Treatment (1966), it was replaced by Peter Brook's Ride of the Valkyrie. The two other planned sections of the film developed into what became Richardson's Red and Blue and Anderson's The White Bus (1967). Of these, only The White Bus received a theatrical release in the UK.

== Release ==
The rediscovered film was released by the BFI on Blu-ray and DVD in 2018.
