= The White Bus =

1967 British film by Lindsay Anderson

- Frame from the film
- Directed by: Lindsay Anderson
- Screenplay by: Shelagh Delaney
- Based on: a short story by Shelagh Delaney
- Produced by: Lindsay Anderson
- Starring: Patricia Healey
- Cinematography: Miroslav Ondříček
- Edited by: Kevin Brownlow
- Music by: Misha Donat
- Production companies: Woodfall Film Productions; Holly Productions
- Distributed by: United Artists
- Release date: December 1967 (UK)
- Running time: 46 minutes
- Country: United Kingdom
- Language: English

The White Bus is a 1967 British short drama film directed by Lindsay Anderson and starring Patricia Healey. The screenplay was adapted by Shelagh Delaney from a short story in her collection Sweetly Sings the Donkey (1963). It was the film debut of Anthony Hopkins.

== Plot ==
The main character, only referred to as 'The Girl' leaves London, goes north on a train full of football fans and takes a trip in a white double-decker bus around an unnamed city she is visiting (although clearly based on Manchester, near Delaney’s hometown of Salford). The Mayor, a local businessman, and the council's ceremonial macebearer happen also to be taking the trip while they show the city to visiting foreigners.

== Cast ==
- Patricia Healey as the girl
- Arthur Lowe as the mayor
- John Sharp as the macebearer
- Julie Perry as conductress
- Stephen Moore as young man
- Victor Henry as transistorite
- John Savident as supporter
- Fanny Carby as supporter
- Malcolm Taylor as supporter
- Alan O'Keeffe as supporter
- Anthony Hopkins as Brechtian
- Jeanne Watts woman, fish shop couple
- Eddie King as man, fish shop couple
- Barry Evans as boy
- Penny Ryder as girl
- Dennis Alaba Peters as Mr Wombe

== Production ==
The film was originally commissioned by producer Oscar Lewenstein, then a director of Woodfall, as one third of an anthology feature entitled Red, White and Zero (1967), with the other sections supplied by Anderson's Free Cinema collaborators Tony Richardson and Karel Reisz from the other short stories by Shelagh Delaney.

The "first real day's shooting" was on 19 October 1965, and took about a month to complete.

The two other planned sections of the film developed into Richardson's Red and Blue (1967) and – Reisz having dropped out – Peter Brook's Ride of the Valkyrie (1967), neither of which are related to Delaney's work. Of these, only The White Bus received a theatrical release in the UK.

== Critical reception ==
The Monthly Film Bulletin wrote: "It emerges as a curiously muddled film, an interesting and ambitious experiment whose very diversity is ultimately its own undoing. The main problem is one of perspective. On a superficial level the film is about alienation, and a familiar alienation – that of the returning native ... If the tour which the girl joins is meant to be a generalised attack on the prim self-satisfaction of provincial officialdom, we are surely entitled to something with a harder edge than the patronising attitudes which the film seems to be striking. Arthur Lowe's Mayor is a telling caricature of bumptious officialdom, but since it is a caricature we can hardly be expected to accept at face value (as the film seems to want us to do) the facile jibes at soulless provincialism which Anderson makes by juxtaposing official statements with visual comment."

Kine Weekly wrote: "The film appears to be an attempt to explore a phase of loneliness, while it laughs at civic pomposity. It is all rather obvious, confected with gimmicky photography and flashes of harsh colour, and the humour consists of a few intellectual giggles among feet of humdrum sightseeing around a town hardly worth seeing. As the lonely girl Patricia Healey looks suitably agog with disinterest throughout."
