= BAFTA Award for Best Cinematography =

British film industry award

- Awarded for: Best Cinematography
- Location: United Kingdom
- Presented by: British Academy of Film and Television Arts
- Currently held by: Michael Bauman for One Battle After Another (2025)
- Website: http://www.bafta.org/

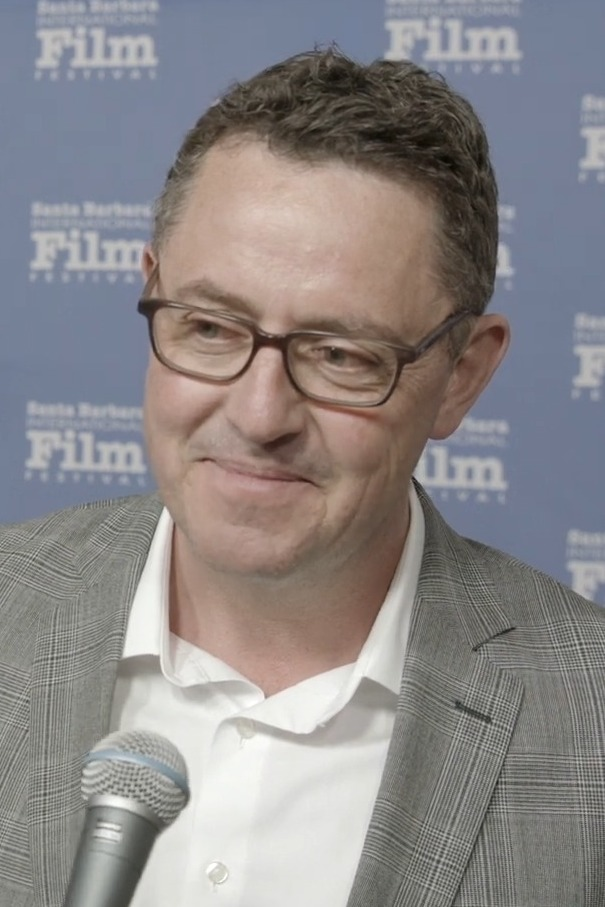
Greig Fraser at the 2022 Santa Barbara International Film Festival in Santa Barbara, California.

The BAFTA Award for Best Cinematography is a film award presented by the British Academy of Film and Television Arts (BAFTA) at the annual British Academy Film Awards to recognize a cinematographer who has delivered outstanding cinematography in a film.

BAFTA is a British organisation that hosts annual awards shows for film, television, and video games (and formerly also for children's film and television). Since 1963, selected cinematographers have been awarded with the BAFTA award for Best Cinematography at an annual ceremony.

In the following lists, the titles and names in bold with a gold background are the winners and recipients respectively; those not in bold are the nominees. The years given are those in which the films under consideration were released, not the year of the ceremony, which always takes place the following year.

== Winners and nominees ==
indicates the winner

=== 1960s ===
Year	Film	Cinematographer
**1963** (17th)	Best Cinematography – Black and White	
**1963** (17th)	**The Servant**	**Douglas Slocombe**
**1963** (17th)	Billy Liar	Denys N. Coop
**1963** (17th)	Heavens Above!	Mutz Greenbaum
**1963** (17th)	Station Six-Sahara	Gerald Gibbs
**1963** (17th)	The Victors	Christopher Challis
**1963** (17th)	Best Cinematography – Colour	
**1963** (17th)	**From Russia with Love**	**Ted Moore**
**1963** (17th)	Nine Hours to Rama	Arthur Ibbetson
**1963** (17th)	The Running Man	Robert Krasker
**1963** (17th)	Sammy Going South	Erwin Hillier
**1963** (17th)	The Scarlet Blade	Jack Asher
**1963** (17th)	Tamahine	Geoffrey Unsworth
**1963** (17th)	The V.I.P.s	Jack Hildyard
**1964** (18th)	Best Cinematography – Black and White	
**1964** (18th)	**The Pumpkin Eater**	**Oswald Morris**
**1964** (18th)	Guns at Batasi	Douglas Slocombe
**1964** (18th)	King & Country	Denys N. Coop
**1964** (18th)	Séance on a Wet Afternoon	Gerry Turpin
**1964** (18th)	Best Cinematography – Colour	
**1964** (18th)	**Becket**	**Geoffrey Unsworth**
**1964** (18th)	The Chalk Garden	Arthur Ibbetson
**1964** (18th)	Nothing but the Best	Nicolas Roeg
**1964** (18th)	The Yellow Rolls-Royce	Jack Hildyard
**1964** (18th)	The 7th Dawn	Freddie Young
**1965** (19th)	Best Cinematography – Black and White	
**1965** (19th)	**The Hill**	**Oswald Morris**
**1965** (19th)	Darling	Kenneth Higgins
**1965** (19th)	The Knack ...and How to Get It	David Watkin
**1965** (19th)	Repulsion	Gilbert Taylor
**1965** (19th)	Best Cinematography – Colour	
**1965** (19th)	**The Ipcress File**	**Otto Heller**
**1965** (19th)	Help!	David Watkin
**1965** (19th)	Lord Jim	Freddie Young
**1965** (19th)	Those Magnificent Men in their Flying Machines; Or, How I Flew from London to Paris in 25 Hours 11 Minutes	Christopher Challis
**1966** (20th)	Best Cinematography – Black and White	
**1966** (20th)	**The Spy Who Came in from the Cold**	**Oswald Morris**
**1966** (20th)	Bunny Lake Is Missing	Denys N. Coop
**1966** (20th)	Cul-de-sac	Gilbert Taylor
**1966** (20th)	Georgy Girl	Kenneth Higgins
**1966** (20th)	Best Cinematography – Colour	
**1966** (20th)	**Arabesque**	**Christopher Challis**
**1966** (20th)	Alfie	Otto Heller
**1966** (20th)	The Blue Max	Douglas Slocombe
**1966** (20th)	Modesty Blaise	Jack Hildyard
**1967** (21st)	Best Cinematography – Black and White	
**1967** (21st)	**The Whisperers**	**Gerry Turpin**
**1967** (21st)	Mademoiselle	David Watkin
**1967** (21st)	The Sailor from Gibraltar	Raoul Coutard
**1967** (21st)	Ulysses	Wolfgang Suschitzky
**1967** (21st)	Best Cinematography – Colour	
**1967** (21st)	**A Man for All Seasons**	**Ted Moore**
**1967** (21st)	Blow-up	Carlo Di Palma
**1967** (21st)	The Deadly Affair	Freddie Young
**1967** (21st)	Far from the Madding Crowd	Nicolas Roeg
Best Cinematography
**1968** (22nd)	**2001: A Space Odyssey**	**Geoffrey Unsworth**
**1968** (22nd)	Elvira Madigan	Jörgen Persson
**1968** (22nd)	The Charge of the Light Brigade	David Watkin
**1968** (22nd)	The Lion in Winter	Douglas Slocombe
**1969** (23rd)	**Oh! What a Lovely War**	**Gerry Turpin**
**1969** (23rd)	Bullitt	William A. Fraker
**1969** (23rd)	Funny Girl / Hello, Dolly!	Harry Stradling ^{[A]}
**1969** (23rd)	The Magus / Women in Love	Billy Williams ^{[A]}

=== 1970s ===
Year	Film	Cinematographer
**1970** (24th)	**Butch Cassidy and the Sundance Kid**	**Conrad L. Hall**
**1970** (24th)	Catch-22	David Watkin
**1970** (24th)	Ryan's Daughter	Freddie Young
**1970** (24th)	Waterloo	Armando Nannuzzi
**1971** (25th)	**Death in Venice**	**Pasqualino De Santis**
**1971** (25th)	Fiddler on the Roof	Oswald Morris
**1971** (25th)	The Go-Between	Gerry Fisher
**1971** (25th)	Sunday Bloody Sunday	Billy Williams
**1972** (26th)	**Alice's Adventures in Wonderland** / **Cabaret**	**Geoffrey Unsworth ^{[A]}**
**1972** (26th)	A Clockwork Orange	John Alcott
**1972** (26th)	Deliverance / Images / McCabe & Mrs. Miller	Vilmos Zsigmond ^{[A]}
**1972** (26th)	The Garden of the Finzi-Continis	Ennio Guarnieri
**1973** (27th)	**Don't Look Now**	**Anthony B. Richmond**
**1973** (27th)	Cries and Whispers	Sven Nykvist
**1973** (27th)	Jesus Christ Superstar / Travels with My Aunt	Douglas Slocombe ^{[A]}
**1973** (27th)	Sleuth	Oswald Morris
**1974** (28th)	**The Great Gatsby**	**Douglas Slocombe**
**1974** (28th)	Chinatown	John A. Alonzo
**1974** (28th)	Murder on the Orient Express / Zardoz	Geoffrey Unsworth ^{[A]}
**1974** (28th)	The Three Musketeers	David Watkin
**1975** (29th)	**Barry Lyndon**	**John Alcott**
**1975** (29th)	The Man Who Would Be King	Oswald Morris
**1975** (29th)	Rollerball	Douglas Slocombe
**1975** (29th)	The Towering Inferno	Fred J. Koenekamp
**1976** (30th)	**Picnic at Hanging Rock**	**Russell Boyd**
**1976** (30th)	Aces High	Peter Allwork and Gerry Fisher
**1976** (30th)	All the President's Men	Gordon Willis
**1976** (30th)	One Flew Over the Cuckoo's Nest	Bill Butler, William A. Fraker and Haskell Wexler
**1977** (31st)	**A Bridge Too Far**	**Geoffrey Unsworth**
**1977** (31st)	The Deep	Christopher Challis
**1977** (31st)	Fellini's Casanova	Giuseppe Rotunno
**1977** (31st)	Valentino	Peter Suschitzky
**1978** (32nd)	**Julia**	**Douglas Slocombe**
**1978** (32nd)	Close Encounters of the Third Kind	Vilmos Zsigmond
**1978** (32nd)	The Duellists	Frank Tidy
**1978** (32nd)	Superman	Geoffrey Unsworth
**1979** (33rd)	**The Deer Hunter**	**Vilmos Zsigmond**
**1979** (33rd)	Apocalypse Now	Vittorio Storaro
**1979** (33rd)	Manhattan	Gordon Willis
**1979** (33rd)	Yanks	Dick Bush

=== 1980s ===
Year	Film	Cinematographer
**1980** (34th)	**All That Jazz**	**Giuseppe Rotunno**
**1980** (34th)	The Black Stallion	Caleb Deschanel
**1980** (34th)	The Elephant Man	Freddie Francis
**1980** (34th)	Kagemusha	Takao Saitô and Masaharu Ueda
**1981** (35th)	**Tess**	**Ghislain Cloquet and Geoffrey Unsworth**
**1981** (35th)	Chariots of Fire	David Watkin
**1981** (35th)	The French Lieutenant's Woman	Freddie Francis
**1981** (35th)	Raiders of the Lost Ark	Douglas Slocombe
**1982** (36th)	**Blade Runner**	**Jordan Cronenweth**
**1982** (36th)	E.T. the Extra-Terrestrial	Allen Daviau
**1982** (36th)	Gandhi	Ronnie Taylor and Billy Williams
**1982** (36th)	Reds	Vittorio Storaro
**1983** (37th)	**Fanny and Alexander**	**Sven Nykvist**
**1983** (37th)	Heat and Dust	Walter Lassally
**1983** (37th)	Local Hero	Chris Menges
**1983** (37th)	Zelig	Gordon Willis
**1984** (38th)	**The Killing Fields**	**Chris Menges**
**1984** (38th)	Greystoke: The Legend of Tarzan, Lord of the Apes	John Alcott
**1984** (38th)	Indiana Jones and the Temple of Doom	Douglas Slocombe
**1984** (38th)	Once Upon a Time in America	Tonino Delli Colli
**1985** (39th)	**Amadeus**	**Miroslav Ondříček**
**1985** (39th)	The Emerald Forest	Philippe Rousselot
**1985** (39th)	A Passage to India	Ernest Day
**1985** (39th)	Witness	John Seale
**1986** (40th)	**Out of Africa**	**David Watkin**
**1986** (40th)	The Mission	Chris Menges
**1986** (40th)	Ran	Takao Saitô and Masaharu Ueda
**1986** (40th)	A Room with a View	Tony Pierce-Roberts
**1987** (41st)	**Jean de Florette**	**Bruno Nuytten**
**1987** (41st)	Cry Freedom	Ronnie Taylor
**1987** (41st)	Hope and Glory	Philippe Rousselot
**1987** (41st)	Platoon	Robert Richardson
**1988** (42nd)	**Empire of the Sun**	**Allen Daviau**
**1988** (42nd)	Babettes gæstebud	Henning Kristiansen
**1988** (42nd)	The Last Emperor	Vittorio Storaro
**1988** (42nd)	Who Framed Roger Rabbit	Dean Cundey
**1989** (43rd)	**Mississippi Burning**	**Peter Biziou**
**1989** (43rd)	Dangerous Liaisons	Philippe Rousselot
**1989** (43rd)	Gorillas in the Mist	Alan Root and John Seale
**1989** (43rd)	Henry V	Kenneth MacMillan
**1989** (43rd)	The Bear	Philippe Rousselot

=== 1990s ===
Year	Film	Cinematographer
**1990** (44th)	**The Sheltering Sky**	**Vittorio Storaro**
**1990** (44th)	Goodfellas	Michael Ballhaus
**1990** (44th)	Glory	Freddie Francis
**1990** (44th)	Cinema Paradiso	Blasco Giurato
**1991** (45th)	**Cyrano de Bergerac**	**Pierre Lhomme**
**1991** (45th)	Thelma & Louise	Adrian Biddle
**1991** (45th)	The Silence of the Lambs	Tak Fujimoto
**1991** (45th)	Dances with Wolves	Dean Semler
**1992** (46th)	**The Last of the Mohicans**	**Dante Spinotti**
**1992** (46th)	Cape Fear	Freddie Francis
**1992** (46th)	Unforgiven	Jack N. Green
**1992** (46th)	Howards End	Tony Pierce-Roberts
**1993** (47th)	**Schindler's List**	**Janusz Kamiński**
**1993** (47th)	The Age of Innocence	Michael Ballhaus
**1993** (47th)	The Piano	Stuart Dryburgh
**1993** (47th)	The Remains of the Day	Tony Pierce-Roberts
**1994** (48th)	**Interview with the Vampire**	**Philippe Rousselot**
**1994** (48th)	The Adventures of Priscilla, Queen of the Desert	Brian J. Breheny
**1994** (48th)	Forrest Gump	Don Burgess
**1994** (48th)	Pulp Fiction	Andrzej Sekuła
**1995** (49th)	**Braveheart**	**John Toll**
**1995** (49th)	Sense and Sensibility	Michael Coulter
**1995** (49th)	Apollo 13	Dean Cundey
**1995** (49th)	The Madness of King George	Andrew Dunn
**1996** (50th)	**The English Patient**	**John Seale**
**1996** (50th)	Fargo	Roger Deakins
**1996** (50th)	Evita	Darius Khondji
**1996** (50th)	Michael Collins	Chris Menges
**1997** (51st)	**The Wings of the Dove**	**Eduardo Serra**
**1997** (51st)	Titanic	Russell Carpenter
**1997** (51st)	Romeo + Juliet	Donald McAlpine
**1997** (51st)	L.A. Confidential	Dante Spinotti
**1998** (52nd)	**Elizabeth**	**Remi Adefarasin**
**1998** (52nd)	The Truman Show	Peter Biziou
**1998** (52nd)	Shakespeare in Love	Richard Greatrex
**1998** (52nd)	Saving Private Ryan	Janusz Kamiński
**1999** (53rd)	**American Beauty**	**Conrad L. Hall**
**1999** (53rd)	The Matrix	Bill Pope
**1999** (53rd)	The End of the Affair	Roger Pratt
**1999** (53rd)	The Talented Mr. Ripley	John Seale
**1999** (53rd)	Angela's Ashes	Michael Seresin

=== 2000s ===
Year	Film	Cinematographer
**2000** (54th)	**Gladiator**	**John Mathieson**
**2000** (54th)	O Brother, Where Art Thou?	Roger Deakins
**2000** (54th)	Crouching Tiger, Hidden Dragon	Peter Pau
**2000** (54th)	Chocolat	Roger Pratt
**2000** (54th)	Billy Elliot	Brian Tufano
**2001** (55th)	**The Man Who Wasn't There**	**Roger Deakins**
**2001** (55th)	Amélie	Bruno Delbonnel
**2001** (55th)	Black Hawk Down	Sławomir Idziak
**2001** (55th)	The Lord of the Rings: The Fellowship of the Ring	Andrew Lesnie
**2001** (55th)	Moulin Rouge!	Donald McAlpine
**2002** (56th)	**Road to Perdition**	**Conrad L. Hall**
**2002** (56th)	Gangs of New York	Michael Ballhaus
**2002** (56th)	Chicago	Dion Beebe
**2002** (56th)	The Pianist	Paweł Edelman
**2002** (56th)	The Lord of the Rings: The Two Towers	Andrew Lesnie
**2003** (57th)	**The Lord of the Rings: The Return of the King**	**Andrew Lesnie**
**2003** (57th)	Lost in Translation	Lance Acord
**2003** (57th)	Master and Commander: The Far Side of the World	Russell Boyd
**2003** (57th)	Cold Mountain	John Seale
**2003** (57th)	Girl with a Pearl Earring	Eduardo Serra
**2004** (58th)	**Collateral**	**Dion Beebe and Paul Cameron**
**2004** (58th)	The Motorcycle Diaries	Éric Gautier
**2004** (58th)	The Aviator	Robert Richardson
**2004** (58th)	Finding Neverland	Roberto Schaefer
**2004** (58th)	House of Flying Daggers	Zhao Xiaoding
**2005** (59th)	**Memoirs of a Geisha**	**Dion Beebe**
**2005** (59th)	March of the Penguins	Laurent Chalet and Jérôme Maison
**2005** (59th)	The Constant Gardener	César Charlone
**2005** (59th)	Crash	J. Michael Muro
**2005** (59th)	Brokeback Mountain	Rodrigo Prieto
**2006** (60th)	**Children of Men**	**Emmanuel Lubezki**
**2006** (60th)	United 93	Barry Ackroyd
**2006** (60th)	Casino Royale	Phil Méheux
**2006** (60th)	Pan's Labyrinth	Guillermo Navarro
**2006** (60th)	Babel	Rodrigo Prieto
**2007** (61st)	**No Country for Old Men**	**Roger Deakins**
**2007** (61st)	There Will Be Blood	Robert Elswit
**2007** (61st)	Atonement	Seamus McGarvey
**2007** (61st)	American Gangster	Harris Savides
**2007** (61st)	The Bourne Ultimatum	Oliver Wood
**2008** (62nd)	**Slumdog Millionaire**	**Anthony Dod Mantle**
**2008** (62nd)	The Reader	Roger Deakins and Chris Menges
**2008** (62nd)	The Curious Case of Benjamin Button	Claudio Miranda
**2008** (62nd)	The Dark Knight	Wally Pfister
**2008** (62nd)	Changeling	Tom Stern
**2009** (63rd)	**The Hurt Locker**	**Barry Ackroyd**
**2009** (63rd)	The Road	Javier Aguirresarobe
**2009** (63rd)	Avatar	Mauro Fiore
**2009** (63rd)	District 9	Trent Opaloch
**2009** (63rd)	Inglourious Basterds	Robert Richardson

=== 2010s ===
Year	Film	Cinematographer
**2010** (64th)	**True Grit**	**Roger Deakins**
**2010** (64th)	127 Hours	Enrique Chediak and Anthony Dod Mantle
**2010** (64th)	The King's Speech	Danny Cohen
**2010** (64th)	Black Swan	Matthew Libatique
**2010** (64th)	Inception	Wally Pfister
**2011** (65th)	**The Artist**	**Guillaume Schiffman**
**2011** (65th)	The Girl with the Dragon Tattoo	Jeff Cronenweth
**2011** (65th)	War Horse	Janusz Kamiński
**2011** (65th)	Hugo	Robert Richardson
**2011** (65th)	Tinker Tailor Soldier Spy	Hoyte van Hoytema
**2012** (66th)	**Life of Pi**	**Claudio Miranda**
**2012** (66th)	Les Misérables	Danny Cohen
**2012** (66th)	Skyfall	Roger Deakins
**2012** (66th)	Lincoln	Janusz Kamiński
**2012** (66th)	Anna Karenina	Seamus McGarvey
**2013** (67th)	**Gravity**	**Emmanuel Lubezki**
**2013** (67th)	Captain Phillips	Barry Ackroyd
**2013** (67th)	12 Years a Slave	Sean Bobbitt
**2013** (67th)	Inside Llewyn Davis	Bruno Delbonnel
**2013** (67th)	Nebraska	Phedon Papamichael
**2014** (68th)	**Birdman**	**Emmanuel Lubezki**
**2014** (68th)	Ida	Ryszard Lenczewski and Łukasz Żal
**2014** (68th)	Mr. Turner	Dick Pope
**2014** (68th)	Interstellar	Hoyte van Hoytema
**2014** (68th)	The Grand Budapest Hotel	Robert Yeoman
**2015** (69th)	**The Revenant**	**Emmanuel Lubezki**
**2015** (69th)	Sicario	Roger Deakins
**2015** (69th)	Bridge of Spies	Janusz Kamiński
**2015** (69th)	Carol	Edward Lachman
**2015** (69th)	Mad Max: Fury Road	John Seale
**2016** (70th)	**La La Land**	**Linus Sandgren**
**2016** (70th)	Lion	Greig Fraser
**2016** (70th)	Nocturnal Animals	Seamus McGarvey
**2016** (70th)	Hell or High Water	Giles Nuttgens
**2016** (70th)	Arrival	Bradford Young
**2017** (71st)	**Blade Runner 2049**	**Roger Deakins**
**2017** (71st)	Three Billboards Outside Ebbing, Missouri	Ben Davis
**2017** (71st)	Darkest Hour	Bruno Delbonnel
**2017** (71st)	The Shape of Water	Dan Laustsen
**2017** (71st)	Dunkirk	Hoyte van Hoytema
**2018** (72nd)	**Roma**	**Alfonso Cuarón**
**2018** (72nd)	The Favourite	Robbie Ryan
**2018** (72nd)	First Man	Linus Sandgren
**2018** (72nd)	Bohemian Rhapsody	Newton Thomas Sigel
**2018** (72nd)	Cold War	Łukasz Żal
**2019** (73rd)	**1917**	**Roger Deakins**
**2019** (73rd)	Le Mans '66	Phedon Papamichael
**2019** (73rd)	The Irishman	Rodrigo Prieto
**2019** (73rd)	Joker	Lawrence Sher
**2019** (73rd)	The Lighthouse	Jarin Blaschke

=== 2020s ===
Year	Film	Cinematographer
**2020** (74th)	**Nomadland**	**Joshua James Richards**
**2020** (74th)	Judas and the Black Messiah	Sean Bobbitt
**2020** (74th)	Mank	Erik Messerschmidt
**2020** (74th)	The Mauritanian	Alwin H. Küchler
**2020** (74th)	News of the World	Dariusz Wolski
**2021** (75th)	**Dune**	**Greig Fraser**
**2021** (75th)	Nightmare Alley	Dan Laustsen
**2021** (75th)	No Time to Die	Linus Sandgren
**2021** (75th)	The Power of the Dog	Ari Wegner
**2021** (75th)	The Tragedy of Macbeth	Bruno Delbonnel
**2022** (76th)	**All Quiet on the Western Front**	**James Friend**
**2022** (76th)	The Batman	Greig Fraser
**2022** (76th)	Elvis	Mandy Walker
**2022** (76th)	Empire of Light	Roger Deakins
**2022** (76th)	Top Gun: Maverick	Claudio Miranda
**2023** (77th)
**2023** (77th)	**Oppenheimer**	**Hoyte van Hoytema**
**2023** (77th)	Killers of the Flower Moon	Rodrigo Prieto
**2023** (77th)	Maestro	Matthew Libatique
**2023** (77th)	Poor Things	Robbie Ryan
**2023** (77th)	The Zone of Interest	Łukasz Żal
**2024** (78th)
**2024** (78th)	**The Brutalist**	**Lol Crawley**
**2024** (78th)	Conclave	Stéphane Fontaine
**2024** (78th)	Dune: Part Two	Greig Fraser
**2024** (78th)	Emilia Pérez	Paul Guilhaume
**2024** (78th)	Nosferatu	Jarin Blaschke
**2025** (79th)	**One Battle After Another**	**Michael Bauman**
**2025** (79th)	Frankenstein	Dan Laustsen
**2025** (79th)	Marty Supreme	Darius Khondji
**2025** (79th)	Sinners	Autumn Durald Arkapaw
**2025** (79th)	Train Dreams	Adolpho Veloso

== Multiple wins and nominations ==
=== Multiple nominations ===
11 nominations

- Roger Deakins

10 nominations

- Douglas Slocombe

8 nominations

- Geoffrey Unsworth
- David Watkin

6 nominations

- Oswald Morris
- John Seale

5 nominations

- Janusz Kaminski
- Chris Menges
- Philippe Rousselot

4 nominations

- Christopher Challis
- Bruno Delbonnel
- Freddie Francis
- Greig Fraser
- Hoyte van Hoytema
- Emmanuel Lubezki
- Rodrigo Prieto
- Robert Richardson
- Vittorio Storaro
- Freddie Young

3 nominations

- Barry Ackroyd
- John Alcott
- Michael Ballhaus
- Dion Beebe
- Denys Coop
- Conrad Hall
- Jack Hildyard
- Andrew Lesnie
- Seamus McGarvey
- Claudio Miranda
- Tony Pierce-Roberts
- Linus Sandgren
- Gerry Turpin
- Billy Williams
- Gordon Willis
- Łukasz Żal
- Vilmos Zsigmond

2 nominations

- Peter Biziou
- Jarin Blaschke
- Sean Bobbitt
- Russell Boyd
- Danny Cohen
- Dean Cundey
- Allen Daviau
- Anthony Dod Mantle
- Gerry Fisher
- William A. Fraker
- Otto Heller
- Kenneth Higgins
- Arthur Ibbetson
- Dan Laustsen
- Matthew Libatique
- Donald McAlpine
- Ted Moore
- Sven Nykvist
- Phedon Papamichael
- Wally Pfister
- Roger Pratt
- Nicolas Roeg
- Giuseppe Rotunno
- Robbie Ryan
- Takao Saitô
- Eduardo Serra
- Dante Spinotti
- Gilbert Taylor
- Ronnie Taylor
- Masaharu Ueda

=== Multiple wins ===
5 wins

- Roger Deakins
- Geoffrey Unsworth

4 wins

- Emmanuel Lubezki

3 wins

- Conrad Hall
- Oswald Morris
- Douglas Slocombe

2 wins

- Dion Beebe
- Ted Moore
- Gerry Turpin

== See also ==
- Academy Award for Best Cinematography
- American Society of Cinematographers Award for Outstanding Achievement in Cinematography in Theatrical Releases
- Critics' Choice Movie Award for Best Cinematography
- Independent Spirit Award for Best Cinematography

== Notes ==
A^{1} ^{2} ^{3} ^{4} ^{5} ^{6} : According to the BAFTAs database, Harry Stradling, Billy Williams, Geoffrey Unsworth, and Douglas Slocombe were all nominated for their photography on two different films, while Vilmos Zsigmond was nominated for three films. Unsworth is the only cameraman to receive dual nominations twice.
