= Mademoiselle (1966 film) =

1966 film directed by Tony Richardson

- Theatrical release poster
- Directed by: Tony Richardson
- Written by: Marguerite Duras; Jean Genet
- Produced by: Oscar Lewenstein
- Starring: Jeanne Moreau; Ettore Manni; Keith Skinner
- Cinematography: David Watkin
- Edited by: Antony Gibbs; Sophie Coussein
- Music by: Antoine Duhamel
- Production companies: Woodfall Film Productions; Procinex
- Distributed by: United Artists
- Release dates: 12 May 1966 (Cannes); 3 June 1966 (France); 12 January 1967 (UK)
- Running time: 105 minutes
- Countries: United Kingdom; France
- Languages: French; Italian
- Box office: $575,000

Mademoiselle is a 1966 French-British psychological thriller film directed by Tony Richardson, from a screenplay by Marguerite Duras and Jean Genet. It stars Jeanne Moreau as the title character, a seemingly-respectable Parisienne schoolteacher in a small French village, who is actually an undetected psychopath.

The film was nominated for the Palme d'Or at the 1966 Cannes Film Festival, and was released theatrically in France on 3 June 1966. It won a BAFTA Award for Best Costume Design (for Jocelyn Rickards). Upon its premiere, the movie received highly divisive reviews which led to it becoming an overlooked and slightly obscure film. Since its initial release, it has been called an underrated and misunderstood masterpiece, with Moreau's acting being described as one of the finest female performances in film history.

== Plot ==
In a small French farming village, visiting Italian logger Manou and his son Bruno sleep in a barn. Manou's sexual dalliances with the local women arouse the hatred and envy of the male villagers, and the jealous villagers blame him for a spate of recent fires and a flood. However, he is innocent; the culprit is the local school teacher, only referred to as "Mademoiselle", a recent arrival admired by all, but sexually repressed and obsessed with Manou. In a flashback, she sets the first fire accidentally and enjoys watching a shirtless Manou perform heroics.

In her apartment, behind closed doors, Mademoiselle has city footwear and clothing, and she puts on sexier attire for the occasions when she deliberately creates mayhem in the village. The fires and flood are no accident and express her mad passion for Manou, all in an attempt to watch him and to draw his attention to herself.

In the meantime, Manou's son Bruno has witnessed her sociopathic nature in private and in the classroom, where she initially favours him as a pupil but then begins to verbally abuse him and repeatedly humiliates him. He discovers evidence that it is Mademoiselle, not his father, who is responsible for the catastrophes, but as a foreign outsider he stays silent.

After many livestock are poisoned by Mademoiselle, some of the villagers take the law into their own hands and set off to punish Manou. Mademoiselle and Manou have an encounter in the forest, followed by a passionate night of sex, after which she returns to the village, with the appearance of someone who has been raped. The villagers ask her if it was Manou who did this to her, she answers "Yes!" and enters her apartment. Then the men of the village find Manou and hack him to death. Mademoiselle leaves the village with her crimes not revealed, but Bruno knows and spits at her as she leaves.

== Cast ==
- Jeanne Moreau as "Mademoiselle"
- Ettore Manni as Manou
- Keith Skinner as Bruno
- Umberto Orsini as Antonio
- Georges Aubert as René
- Jane Beretta as Annett
- Paul Barge as Young Policeman
- Pierre Collet as Marcel
- Gérard Darrieu as Boulet
- Jean Gras as Roger
- Gabriel Gobin as Police Sergeant
- Rosine Luguet as Lisa
- Antoine Marin as Armand
- Georges Douking as the Priest
- Jacques Monod as the Mayor

== Production ==
=== Development ===
The original script was written by French writers Jean Genet and Marguerite Duras as a vehicle for actress Anouk Aimée, to be directed by Georges Franju. When Franju dropped out, the script was given by Genet's friend Jeanne Moreau to British director Tony Richardson.

=== Casting ===
Though Richardson always envisioned Jeanne Moreau as the lead, Jean Genet was opposed to it. Writing for the British Film Institute, critic Alex Ramon wrote that “the actress seems central to the film’s tone and aesthetic in many ways.”

Richardson originally wanted Marlon Brando for the role of Manou, but scheduling could not be arranged.

=== Filming ===
The film was shot on location in and around the tiny village of Le Rat, in the Corrèze département of central France. The entire production team stayed in what accommodation they could find locally for the duration of the shoot.

During filming, Richardson had an affair with Jeanne Moreau, and he divorced his wife Vanessa Redgrave a year after its release.

== Release ==
The film premiered at the 1966 Cannes Film Festival, where it competed for the Palme d'Or, but lost to the tying The Birds, the Bees and the Italians and A Man and a Woman. It was released in France by United Artists on 3 June, and in the United Kingdom on 12 January of the following year.

=== Home media ===
The film was released on VHS and DVD by MGM Home Entertainment in the United States in 1994 and 2002 respectively.

== Reception ==
The film received mixed reviews from critics. Roger Ebert of the Chicago Sun-Times criticised the film as "murky, disjointed and unbearably tedious", while praising Moreau's performance and the visuals. He called Genet's script "like something out of Evergreen Review by way of French pornography."

Writing for the British Film Institute, Alex Ramon called it "a unique work in Richardson’s canon, made at the time of several ambitious, much-panned projects, this oneiric evocation of destruction and desire feels fresh."

Director Richard Lester praised David Watkin's cinematography, calling it "the most beautiful black and white film I have ever, ever seen".

Since its initial release, Jeanne Moreau's performance has received unanimous critical and popular acclaim, despite contemporary reviews of the film itself being polarised. She has been praised for her ability to convey immense undercurrents of desire and rage through silence and subtle expressions, frequently highlighted as the core of the film's power, and delivering a compelling, nuanced and unsettling performance as a sexually repressed schoolteacher who engages in destructive behavior—including arson and poisoning—out of passion and self pleasure. Her performance is considered by many critics, film historians, and fans as singular and mesmerising, and one of the finest portrayals of repressed desire and malice in cinema history..

=== Awards and nominations ===
Ceremony	Category	Nominee	Result
1966 Cannes Film Festival	Palme d'Or	Tony Richardson	Nominated
21st British Academy Film Awards	Best British Costume Design (B&W)	Jocelyn Rickards	Won
21st British Academy Film Awards	Best Cinematography (B&W)	David Watkin	Nominated
