= Gary Raymond =

English actor

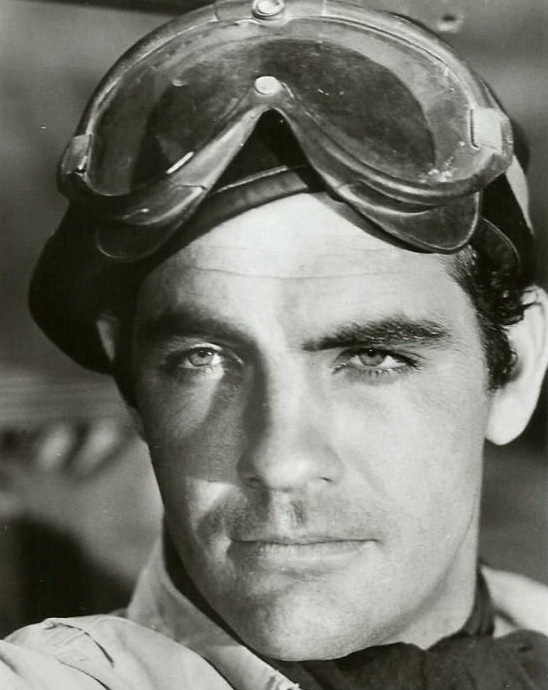
- Raymond as Jack Moffitt in The Rat Patrol, 1967.
- Born: Gary Barrymore Raymond; 20 April 1935 (age 91); Brixton, London, England
- Occupation: Actor
- Years active: 1956–2017, 2022, 2025
- Spouse: Delena Kidd (m. 1961)
- Children: 3

Gary Barrymore Raymond (born 20 April 1935) is an English film, television and theatre actor.

== Biography ==
Gary Raymond was born in Brixton, London, the younger of twins and the youngest of three brothers, to theatrical parents, both of whom were variety artists. His mother died of tuberculosis within nine months of the twins' birth, and the two were then in the care of a nanny. When Raymond was eleven years old, he won a scholarship to the Gateway School and remained there until he was sixteen.

After training at The Royal Academy of Dramatic Art, Raymond worked with the Royal Shakespeare Company in the 1950s, playing roles such as Macbeth, Oberon and Claudius, and others. He made his film debut as Charles Stuart (King Charles II) in the British swashbuckling film The Moonraker (1958). He soon followed up with his role as Cliff Lewis in Tony Richardson's film adaptation of John Osborne's Look Back in Anger (1958), opposite Richard Burton and Mary Ure. Subsequent notable films included: Suddenly, Last Summer (1959), in which he appeared with Katharine Hepburn, Mercedes McCambridge and Elizabeth Taylor; The Millionairess (1960), where Raymond played Sophia Loren's character's husband; El Cid (1961), an epic film in which he played opposite Charlton Heston and Loren; The Playboy of the Western World (1962), which he starred in; Jason and the Argonauts (1963), a fantasy film; and The Greatest Story Ever Told (1965), where he portrayed the apostle Simon bar Jonah, who became Saint Peter.

Raymond's broad theatrical career began in the mid 1950s, and he has continued appearing on stage all throughout his film and television career. Notable productions include She Loves Me, Treasure Island, Irma La Douce, The Sound of Music, Grand Hotel, The Complaisant Lover, As You Like It, Hamlet, The Crucifer of Blood, Twelfth Night, Full Circle, Look After Lulu!, Dick Turpin, Lysistrata, Frost at Midnight, The Numbered, Electra, Castle in Sweden, The World of Susie Wong, Gentlemen Prefer Blondes, A Midsummer Night's Dream, Troilus and Cressida, The Jungle Book, Peer Gynt, The Trackers of Oxyrhynchus, The Good Person of Sichuan, My Children My Africa, The Beaux Stratagem, Bent, Sunday in the Park with George, The Wind in the Willows and Follies, as well as dozens of others.

He is also well known for his role as Sergeant Jack Moffitt in the late-1960s American television show, The Rat Patrol (1966–68), which ran for two seasons.

Raymond has been married since 1961 to actress Delena Kidd, with whom he has three children.

== Filmography ==
Year	Title	Role	Notes
1956	The Black Brigand (TV series)	Francis	8 episodes
1958	The Adventures of Robin Hood (TV series)	Henry	Episode: "One Man's Meat"
1958	About Religion (TV series)		Episode: "Christ in Jeans"
1958	The Moonraker	Charles Stuart	
1958	ITV Television Playhouse (TV series)	Obie	Episode: "Poet's Corner"
1959	Look Back in Anger	Cliff Lewis	
1959	The Invisible Man (TV series)	Prince Jonetta	Episode: "Man in Power"
1959	Suddenly, Last Summer	George Holly	
1960	The Millionairess	Alastair	
1961	ITV Play of the Week (TV series)	Joesy Vaughan	Episode: "Hallelujah Corner"
1961	Drama 61-67 (TV series)		Episode: "Drama '61: The Best of Everything"
1961	El Cid	Prince Sancho	
1962	Out of this World (TV series)	Seldon Bishop	Episode: "Immigrant"
1962	Man of the World (TV series)	Hossain	Episode: "The Frontier"
1962	Playboy of the Western World	The Playboy (Christy Mahon)	
1963	Jason and the Argonauts	Acastus	
1963	The Sentimental Agent (TV series)	Mateo	Episode: "A Box of Tricks"
1964	Martin Chuzzlewit (TV series)	Martin Chuzzlewit	13 episodes
1964	Traitor's Gate/Das Verrätertor	Graham	
1965	The Greatest Story Ever Told	Peter	
1965	The Saint (TV series)	Gilberto Arroyo	Episode: "The Spanish Cow"
1965	Blackmail (TV series)	Machiavelli Edwards	Episode: "Cut Yourself a Slice of Throat"
1966	The Hunchback of Notre Dame (TV series)	Pierre Gringoire	7 episodes
1966	Love Story (TV series)	Karim Lateef	Episode: "Another Name from Nowhere"
1967	Red and Blue	Songwriter	
1966–1968	The Rat Patrol (TV series)	Sergeant Jack Moffitt	58 episodes
1968	What Maisie Knew (TV series)	Sir Claude	3 episodes
1968	Massacre Harbor	Sergeant Jack Moffitt	
1968	Sherlock Holmes (TV series)	Sir Henry Baskerville	2 episodes
1969	Who-Dun-It (TV series)	Jeremy Moon	5 episodes
1969	Dombey and Son (TV mini series)	James Carker	9 episodes
1970	ITV Sunday Night Theatre (TV series)	Orsino	Episode: "Twelfth Night"
1971	UFO (TV series)	Colonel John Grey	Episode: "The Man Who Came Back"
1971	And Mother Makes Three (TV series)	John Montgomery	Episode: "School for Love"
1971	The Doctors (TV series)	Paul Foster	6 episodes
1971	Jason King (TV series)	Sandro	Episode: "Buried in the Cold Cold Ground"
1972	The Persuaders! (TV series)	Sergei	Episode: "The Ozerov Inheritance"
1972	BBC Show of the Week (TV series)		Episode: "Keith Michell at the Adelphi"
1972	New Scotland Yard (TV series)	Ronnie Johnson	Episode: "Evidence of Character"
1972	Harriet's Back in Town (TV series)	Andrew Folland	6 episodes
1973	Comedy Playhouse (TV series)		Episode: "The Birthday"
1974	Boy Dominic (TV series)	Carnaby	Episode: "The Man with the Painted Face"
1976	The New Avengers (TV series)	Roger Masgard	Episode: "Three Handed Game"
1977–1978	The Cedar Tree (TV series)	Jack Poole	36 episodes
1979	Thomas and Sarah (TV series)	Eli Watkins	Episode: "Return to Gethyn"
1979	The Omega Factor (TV series)	Townsend	Episode: "Out of Body, Out of Mind"
1980	Spy! (TV series)	Commandant	Episode: "Camp 020"
1980	Hammer House of Horror (TV series)	Martin	Episode: "The Two Faces of Evil"
1982	Playhouse: The Combination (TV movie)	Father – Mr Bedford	
1983	Jemima Shore Investigates (TV series)	Sterling Stanley	Episode: "Dr. Ziegler's Casebook"
1984	Play for Today (TV series)	Michael	Episode: "Moving on the Edge"
1985	Coronation Street (TV series)	Wally Trainer	Episode: "Episode #1.2524"
1986	God's Outlaw	Sir John Walsh	
1987	Screen Two (TV series)	Quentin Featherston	Episode: "The Children of Dynmouth"
1988	The Attic: The Hiding of Anne Frank (TV movie)	Kraler	
1994	Scarlett (TV mini series)	Old Daniel O'Hara	3 episodes
1995	Casualty (TV series)	William Gower	Episode: "Lost Boys"
1996	Ellington (TV series)	Falconni	Episode: "Man of Honour"
1997	Love in the Ancient World (TV movie)	Member at Platon's Guest meal	
2001	Brilliant! (Short)	Art Collector	
2001	Victoria & Albert (TV movie)	Archbishop	
2003	The Foreigner	Jared Olyphant	
2007	Empathy (TV movie)	Walt	
2010	S.N.U.B!	Ministerial Driver (voice)	
2011	Balzan's Contract (short)		
2014	Sex, Marriage and Infidelity	Sir Edward	
2017	National Theatre Live: Follies	Dimitri Weismann	
2022	House of the Dragon	The High Septon	Episodes: "The Heirs of the Dragon" and "We Light the Way"
2025	The History of Sound	William	
