= 21st British Academy Film Awards =

1968 film awards ceremony

- Date: 1968

Highlights
- Best Film: A Man for All Seasons
- Best British Film: A Man for All Seasons
- Most awards: A Man for All Seasons (7)
- Most nominations: A Man for All Seasons (7)

The 21st British Academy Film Awards, given by the British Academy of Film and Television Arts in 1968, honoured the best films of 1967.

== Winners and nominees ==
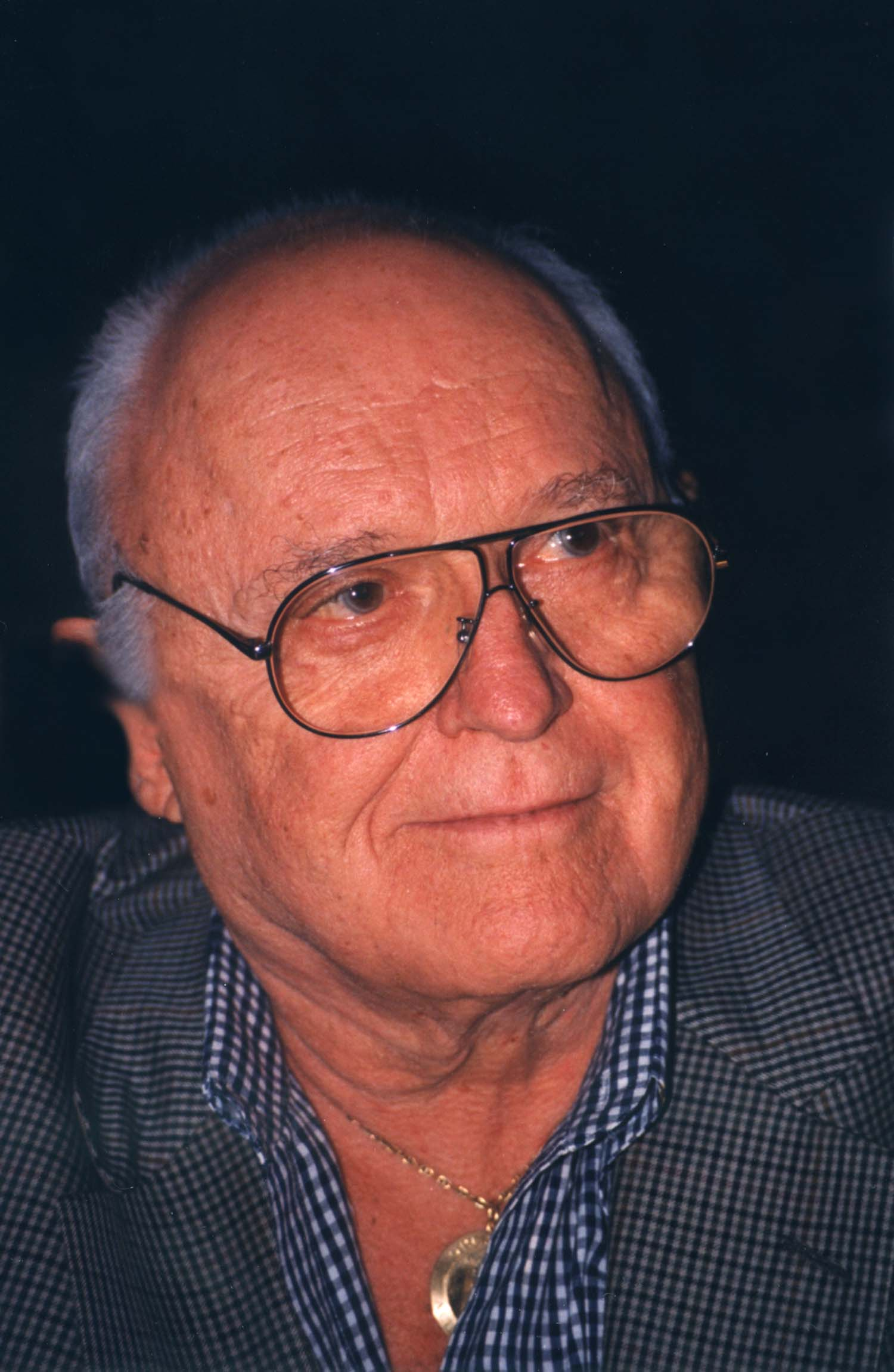
Rod Steiger, Best Foreign Actor winner

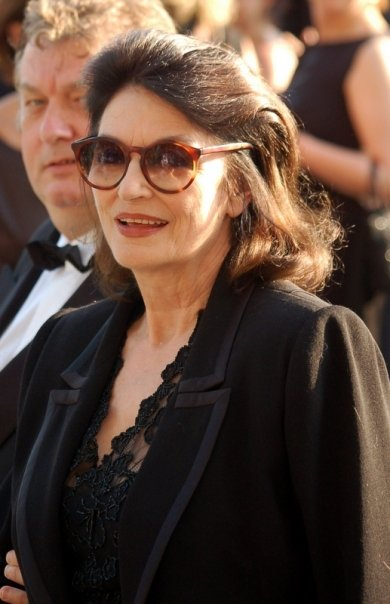
Anouk Aimée, Best Foreign Actress winner

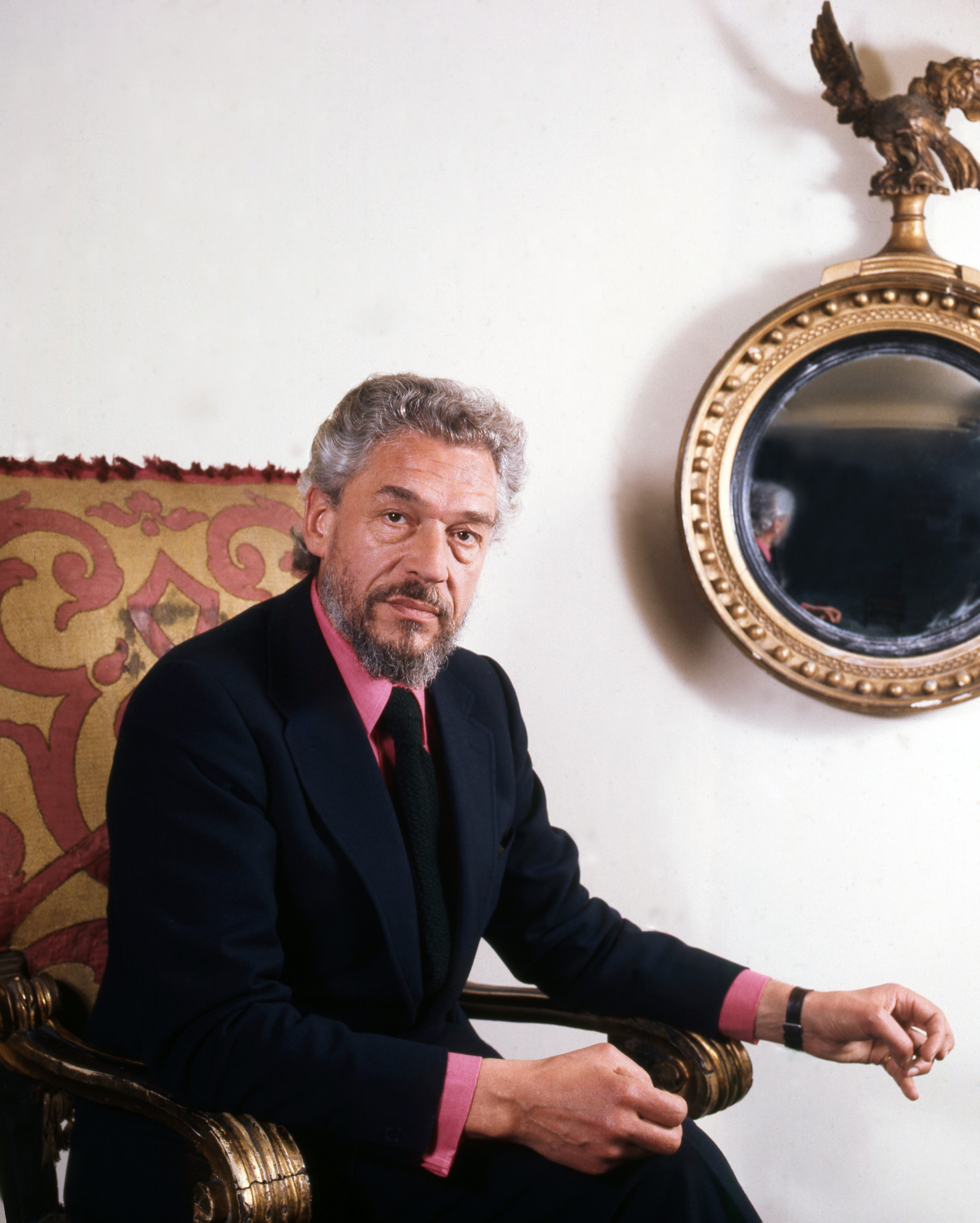
Paul Scofield, Best British Actor winner

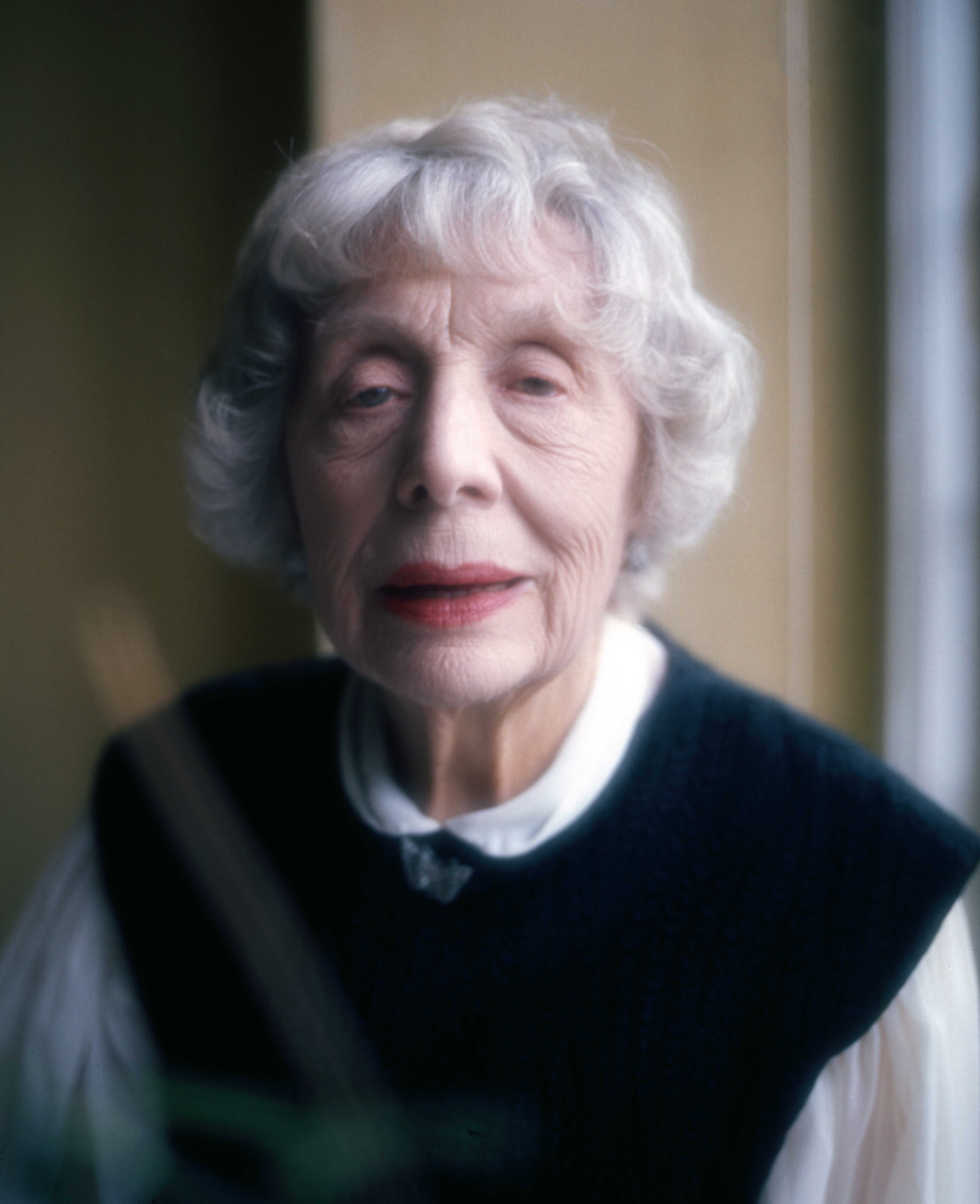
Edith Evans, Best British Actress winner

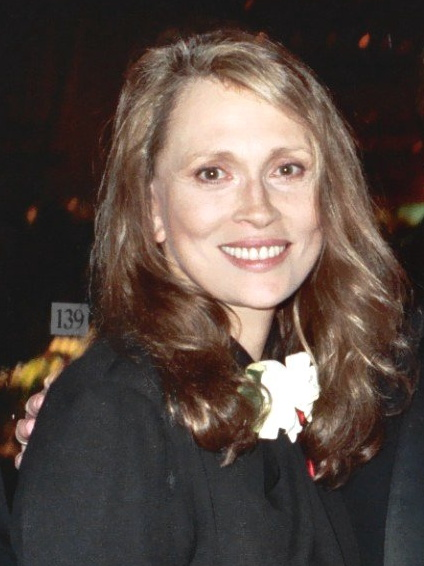
Faye Dunaway, Best Newcomer winner

Best Foreign Actor Rod Steiger – In the Heat of the Night as Chief Bill Gillespie: Orson Welles – Chimes at Midnight as Falstaff; Sidney Poitier – In the Heat of the Night as Virgil Tibbs; Warren Beatty – Bonnie and Clyde as Clyde Chestnut Barrow	Best Foreign Actress Anouk Aimée – A Man and a Woman as Anne Gauthier: Bibi Andersson – My Sister, My Love as Charlotte; Bibi Andersson – Persona as Alma; Jane Fonda – Barefoot in the Park as Corie Bratter; Simone Signoret – The Deadly Affair as Elsa Fennan
Best British Actor Paul Scofield – A Man for All Seasons as Thomas More: Dirk Bogarde – Accident as Stephen; Dirk Bogarde – Our Mother's House as Charlie Hook; James Mason – The Deadly Affair as Charles Dobbs; Richard Burton – The Taming of the Shrew as Petruchio	Best British Actress Edith Evans – The Whisperers as Mrs. Ross: Barbara Jefford – Ulysses as Molly Bloom; Elizabeth Taylor – The Taming of the Shrew as Katharina
Best British Film A Man for All Seasons – Fred Zinnemann: Accident – Joseph Losey; Blowup – Michelangelo Antonioni; The Deadly Affair – Sidney Lumet	Best British Screenplay A Man for All Seasons – Robert Bolt: Accident – Harold Pinter; The Deadly Affair – Paul Dehn; Two for the Road – Frederic Raphael
Best Animated Film Notes on a Triangle – René Jodoin: Tidy Why – Bill Sewell; Toys – Grant Munro	Best Documentary To Die in Madrid – Frédéric Rossif: Famine – Jack Gold; The Things I Cannot Change – Tanya Ballantyne
Best Short Film Indus Waters – Derek Williams: Mafia No! – John Irvin; Opus – Don Levy; Rail – Geoffrey Jones	Best Specialised Film Energy and Matter – Robert Verrall: How the Motor Car Works – Derek Armstrong; Paint – Michael Heckford; Revolutions for All – Jeff Inman
Best Film A Man for All Seasons – Fred Zinnemann: Bonnie and Clyde – Arthur Penn; In the Heat of the Night – Norman Jewison; A Man and a Woman – Claude Lelouch	Best British Art Direction A Man for All Seasons – John Box: Accident – Carmen Dillon; Blowup – Assheton Gorton; You Only Live Twice – Ken Adam
Best British Cinematography, Black and White The Whisperers – Gerry Turpin: Mademoiselle – David Watkin; The Sailor from Gibraltar – Raoul Coutard; Ulysses – Wolfgang Suschitzky	Best British Cinematography, Colour A Man for All Seasons – Ted Moore: Blowup – Carlo Di Palma; The Deadly Affair – Freddie Young; Far from the Madding Crowd – Nicolas Roeg
Best British Costume Design, Black and White Mademoiselle – Jocelyn Rickards: The Sailor from Gibraltar – Jocelyn Rickards	Best British Costume Design, Colour A Man for All Seasons – Elizabeth Haffenden and Joan Bridge: Casino Royale – Julie Harris; Far from the Madding Crowd – Alan Barrett; Half a Sixpence – Elizabeth Haffenden and Joan Bridge
Most Promising Newcomer to Leading Film Roles Faye Dunaway – Bonnie and Clyde as Bonnie Elizabeth Parker; Faye Dunaway – Hurry Sundown as Lou McDowell: Michael J. Pollard – Bonnie and Clyde as C.W. Moss; Milo O'Shea – Ulysses as Leopold Bloom; Peter Kastner – You're a Big Boy Now as Bernard Chanticleer	United Nations Award In the Heat of the Night – Norman Jewison: The Gospel According to St. Matthew – Pier Paolo Pasolini

== Statistics ==
Films that received multiple nominations
Nominations	Film
7	A Man for All Seasons
5	The Deadly Affair
4	Accident
4	In the Heat of the Night
3	Blowup
3	Bonnie and Clyde
3	Ulysses
2	Far from the Madding Crowd
2	Mademoiselle
2	A Man and a Woman
2	The Sailor from Gibraltar
2	The Taming of the Shrew
2	The Whisperers

Films that received multiple awards
Awards	Film
7	A Man for All Seasons
2	In the Heat of the Night
2	The Whisperers

== See also ==
- 40th Academy Awards
- 20th Directors Guild of America Awards
- 25th Golden Globe Awards
- 20th Writers Guild of America Awards
