= Laughter in the Dark (film) =

1969 British film by Tony Richardson

- Film poster
- Directed by: Tony Richardson
- Screenplay by: Edward Bond
- Based on: Laughter in the Dark by Vladimir Nabokov
- Produced by: Neil Hartley
- Starring: Nicol Williamson; Anna Karina
- Cinematography: Dick Bush
- Edited by: Charles Rees
- Music by: Raymond Leppard
- Production company: Woodfall Film Productions
- Distributed by: United Artists (UK)
- Release date: September 1969; (UK)
- Running time: 104 minutes
- Countries: France; United Kingdom
- Language: English
- Box office: $780,000

Laughter in the Dark (French: La Chambre obscure) is a 1969 romantic drama film directed by Tony Richardson and starring Nicol Williamson, Anna Karina and Jean-Claude Drouot. The screenplay was by Edward Bond. It was based on the 1936 novel Laughter in the Dark by Vladimir Nabokov, with the setting changed from 1930s Berlin to 1960s Swinging London.

The film drew respectable reviews, but for reasons that are unclear, it was subsequently removed from distribution.

== Plot ==
Sir Edward More is a wealthy married 40-year-old art dealer who becomes obsessed with young amoral gold-digging cinema usherette Margot and starts an affair with her. When his wife finds out, she leaves him.

At a party thrown for her by More, Margot meets ex-lover Herve Tourace, and they resume their relationship, deciding to exploit More for money. Margot lies to More that his assistant Brian has been making advances to her, and that she fancies him, and suggests he replaces Brian with Tourace, who she says is gay, so won't be a threat. More acquiesces and employs Tourace.

Margot suggests they holiday abroad. At a seaside resort, More bumps into Brian who also happens to be holidaying there. Margot and Tourace make love in a small boat, observed by Brian's wife, who tells More. Furious, More decides that he and Margot will leave immediately. As he drives at speed along a dangerous mountain road, he swerves to avoid oncoming cyclists, and crashes the car. He is blinded.

Margot finds them a villa, and they move in. Unknown to More, so does Tourace, and Margot and Tourace resume their relationship. More gradually becomes suspicious that there is someone else in the house, and eventually attacks the stranger. At the same time, his ex-wife's brother arrives, who says he has just seen Tourace fleeing the villa. More realises what has been going on. When Margot returns from a day trip, he tries to shoot her. He misses, then stumbles and fatally shoots himself. Margot runs from the villa.

== Cast ==
- Nicol Williamson as Sir Edward More
- Anna Karina as Margot
- Jean-Claude Drouot as Herve Tourace
- Peter Bowles as Paul
- Siân Phillips as Lady Pamela More
- Sebastian Breaks as Brian
- Kate O'Toole as Amelia More
- Sheila Burrell as Miss Porly
- Willoughby Goddard as colonel
- Basil Dignam as dealer
- Philippa Urquhart as Philippa
- Edward Gardner as chauffeur (uncredited)
- Helen Booth as maid (uncredited)
- Basil Dignam as art dealer (uncredited)
- John Atkinson as art dealer (uncredited)
- Donald Bisset as art dealer (uncredited)
- John Golightly as art dealer (uncredited)
- Mavis Villiers as woman at gallery (uncredited)
- Allison Blair as girl at gallery (uncredited)
- Diana Harris as girl at party (uncredited)
- Celia Brook as girl at party (uncredited)
- David Hockney as man at party (uncredited)
- Patrick Procktor as man at party (uncredited)

== Production ==
=== Casting ===
Nicol Williamson was a very late replacement for Richard Burton, who had already shot several scenes. Richardson had found Burton's lack of punctuality intolerable. To recruit Williamson in a hurry, Richardson sent a search party to comb the bars and bistros of the Cote d'Azur.

=== Filming locations ===
The film was shot on location in England and Majorca.

== Release ==
=== Obscurity ===
For unknown reasons, the film was removed from distribution.

It has only been shown twice on British television, in 1974 and 1981 on BBC2, and has not been released on any home media format.

=== Critical reception ===
The Monthly Film Bulletin wrote: "Laughter in the Dark proceeds to transcend content with style in a dazzling display of tender cruelty. ... Richardson throws away just about every opportunity to be subtle in his depiction of the archetypal ménage-a-trois. ... As a tale of blindness in several senses, Laughter in the Dark makes a harsh parable; the film faithfully perpetuates this emphasis, and as faithfully pays due respect to Nabokov's painstaking use of doors as a conscious metaphor. Where it fails is in creating the slightest interest in its trio of repulsive characters – no particular fault of the cast, but Williamson is uselessly young, Karina looks delicious in a mini-skirt but is otherwise a cardboard cut-out with a hideous accent, while Drouot is handsome, blank and instantly forgettable. Nabokov deals with weakness and makes it real, human and tragic. Richardson deals with concupiscence and renders it merely tedious."

== Remake ==
A planned 1986 remake by director Laszlo Papas starring Mick Jagger and Rebecca De Mornay (later replaced by Maryam d'Abo) was abandoned.
