= The Playboy of the Western World (film) =

- Original film poster
- Directed by: Brian Desmond Hurst
- Screenplay by: Brian Desmond Hurst; Roland Kibbee
- Based on: The Playboy of the Western World by John Millington Synge
- Produced by: Michael Killanin; Denis O'Dell; Brendan Smith
- Starring: Gary Raymond; Siobhán McKenna
- Cinematography: Geoffrey Unsworth
- Music by: Seán Ó Riada
- Distributed by: Janus Films
- Release date: 1962
- Running time: 100 minutes
- Countries: United Kingdom; United States
- Language: English

The Playboy of the Western World is a 1962 film version of the 1907 play written by John Millington Synge. It was directed and co-written by Brian Desmond Hurst and stars Gary Raymond and Siobhán McKenna. Filmed in County Kerry, the film features many of the Abbey Players. The film was produced by the Four Provinces company created in 1952 by Hurst and Michael Morris, 3rd Baron Killanin who had previously produced John Ford’s The Rising of the Moon and Gideon's Day.

== Plot ==
A young man from a far away village appears in County Mayo announcing to all and sundry that he has murdered his father with a blow to the head. With the tale growing in the telling, the young man becomes a local hero, until his angry father comes to fetch him home.

== Cast ==
- Siobhán McKenna as Pegeen Mike
- Gary Raymond as Christy Mahon
- Elspeth March as The Widow Quinn
- Liam Redmond as Michael James
- Niall MacGinnis as Old Man Mahon

== Production ==
The film was shot at Inch Strand on the Dingle Peninsula, County Kerry. William Constable, the art director built a cottage close to the beach.

== Home media ==
After years of unavailability, the film was remastered from the original film elements and released on both DVD and Blu-Ray by Network Distributing in May 2021. The release includes an image gallery, a trailer, and an interview with Gary Raymond recorded in March 2021.
