= The Knack ...and How to Get It =

1965 British film by Richard Lester

- Theatrical poster
- Directed by: Richard Lester
- Written by: Charles Wood
- Produced by: Oscar Lewenstein
- Starring: Rita Tushingham; Ray Brooks; Michael Crawford; Donal Donnelly
- Cinematography: David Watkin
- Edited by: Antony Gibbs
- Music by: John Barry
- Production company: Woodfall Film Productions
- Distributed by: United Artists Corporation
- Release date: 3 June 1965
- Running time: 85 minutes
- Country: United Kingdom
- Language: English
- Budget: $364,000
- Box office: $2.5 million (US)

The Knack ...and How to Get It is a 1965 British comedy film directed by Richard Lester and starring Rita Tushingham, Ray Brooks, Michael Crawford, and Donal Donnelly. The screenplay by Charles Wood is based on the 1962 play The Knack: A Comedy in Three Acts by Ann Jellicoe. The film is considered emblematic of the Swinging London cultural phenomenon. It was the first movie appearance of Jane Birkin and Charlotte Rampling.

== Plot ==
Colin is a nervous schoolteacher working in London, observing rather than participating in the sexual revolution of the 1960s. He has little personal sexual experience and wishes to gain "the knack" of how to seduce women. He turns to his friend and tenant, a confident womaniser known only by his surname, Tolen. Tolen gives him unhelpful advice to consume more protein and use intuition, acknowledging that intuition is not something that can be completely learned. He advocates the importance of dominating women and suggests that Colin should let another friend move into Colin's spare room, and they could "share" women.

Colin boards the front door shut. Tom, who is passing, takes up occupation of the vacant room. He is obsessed with painting everything white, including the windowpanes. Due to the blocked door, Tolen now brings his women in through the window. Colin swaps his single bed for a fancy old wrought-iron double bed that he finds in a scrapyard with Tom. Nancy meets Colin at the scrapyard. Nancy is an inexperienced and shy young woman who has arrived in London from out of town and is searching for the YWCA. She stops by a clothing store and is won over by the flattery of the clerk until she overhears him repeating the same words to every female customer.

From the scrapyard, the three take the bed on a complex and zany journey back to the house. This includes parking it at a parking meter, moving it on a car transporter, floating it along the River Thames, and carrying it down the steps of the Royal Albert Hall.

In a public space, Tolen sexually assaults Nancy, who at first is silent and then faints. When she wakes up, she claims she was raped, though this was not the case. Tolen, Colin, and Tom are unable to restrain her from loudly repeating the allegations or puncturing the tyres of Tolen's motorcycle. She runs back to the house, where she throws Tolen's records out of the window and strips naked. The men become convinced her rape allegations reflect a rape fantasy and urge Tolen to have sex with her. When Nancy emerges from the room wearing only a robe, she instead expresses more attraction to Colin, and he returns her interest. The two begin living together.

== Cast ==
- Michael Crawford as Colin
- Rita Tushingham as Nancy Jones
- Ray Brooks as Tolen
- Donal Donnelly as Tom
- William Dexter as dress shop owner
- Charles Dyer as man in photo booth
- Margot Thomas as female teacher
- John Bluthal as angry father
- Helen Lennox as girl in photo booth
- Wensley Pithey as teacher
- Edgar Wreford as man in phone booth
- Frank Sieman as surveyor
- Bruce Lacey as surveyor's assistant
- George Chisholm as left luggage porter
- Peter Copley as picture owner
- Timothy Bateson as junkyard owner
- Dandy Nichols as Tom's landlady
- Wanda Ventham as gym mistress
- Julian Holloway and Kenneth Farrington as guardsmen
- Jane Birkin as motorbike girl
- Jacqueline Bisset as sweater girl
- Charlotte Rampling as water skier
- Lucille Soong as girl in sauna

== Production ==
After seeing Ann Jellicoe's play The Knack, the producers envisioned a film adaptation. They offered the position of director to Lindsay Anderson, who refused.

Having worked with The Beatles on A Hard Day's Night, Lester was another candidate for director, and agreed to take the position. Lester made major changes to the play, adding his own touch through direct address, unexpected oddly-edited sequences, humorous subtitles, and a Greek chorus of disapproving members of "the older generation." Filming took place over a few weeks in November and early December 1964, and Lester employed television advertising techniques. Talking about the film in the 1980s, actor Ray Brooks said:

He's a very visual man. They reckon that you could take any frame from Help, The Knack, and A Hard Day's Night and you could put it on the cover of Time/Life. Everything was so beautifully shot."

Lester himself makes a brief cameo as an annoyed bystander. John Barry contributed the jazzy score, which features a memorable organ solo by Alan Haven. Jane Birkin, Charlotte Rampling, and Jacqueline Bisset all made their first cinematic appearances in the film as extras, together with Top of the Pops disc girl Samantha Juste.

== Release ==
=== Critical reception ===
In The New York Times, Bosley Crowther positively reviewed it as "delightfully mobile" and a "frenziedly running, jumping picture". Variety praised the performances, citing Rita Tushingham as perfect in her role.

The film has fared less well on reappraisal. In 2001, the Wallflower Critical Guide noted the creativity in cinematography and editing, but said it disrupted the storytelling.

In 2016, The Hollywood Reporter ranked it the 49th best film to win the Palme d'Or (out of the 69 films to win up to that point), stating it "hasn't aged well" but the setting was a great asset.

In 2020, as part of a profile of Tushingham, Stuart Jeffries in The Guardian called the film "painful to watch", citing "the levity with which the film treats rape, not to mention Nancy's weird hysteria, is bound to make modern audiences a little queasy."

=== Accolades ===
The film was entered into competition at the 1965 Cannes Film Festival, where it won the Palme d'Or.

Award	Date of ceremony	Category	Recipient(s)	Result	Ref(s)
Belgian Film Critics Association	1966	Grand Prix	Richard Lester	Won	
British Academy Film Awards	1966	Best British Film	Richard Lester	Nominated	
British Academy Film Awards	1966	Best Film from Any Source	Richard Lester	Nominated	
British Academy Film Awards	1966	Best Screenplay	Charles Wood	Nominated	
British Academy Film Awards	1966	Best Actress	Rita Tushingham	Nominated	
British Academy Film Awards	1966	Best Cinematography, Black and White	David Watkin	Nominated	
British Academy Film Awards	1966	Most Promising Newcomer	Michael Crawford	Nominated	
Cannes Film Festival	3 – 16 May 1965	Palme d'Or	Richard Lester	Won	
Golden Globe Awards	28 February 1966	Best Actress – Comedy or Musical	Rita Tushingham	Nominated	
Golden Globe Awards	28 February 1966	Best Foreign Film, English Language	Richard Lester	Nominated	
Writers' Guild of Great Britain	10 March 1966	Best British Documentary Film or Short Script	Charles Wood	Won	
