= Joseph Andrews (film) =

- Theatrical release poster, artwork by Ted CoConis
- Directed by: Tony Richardson
- Written by: Allan Scott
- Screenplay by: Chris Bryant
- Based on: Joseph Andrews by Henry Fielding
- Starring: Ann-Margret; Peter Firth; Michael Hordern; Beryl Reid; Jim Dale
- Cinematography: David Watkin
- Edited by: Thom Noble
- Music by: John Addison
- Production company: Woodfall Film Productions
- Distributed by: United Artists
- Release date: April 1977
- Running time: 104 min.
- Country: United Kingdom
- Language: English
- Budget: $3 million
- Box office: $839,865 (US)

Joseph Andrews is a 1977 British period comedy film directed by Tony Richardson and starring Ann-Margret, Peter Firth, Michael Hordern, Beryl Reid and Jim Dale. The screenplay was by Allan Scott and Chris Bryant based on the 1742 novel Joseph Andrews by Henry Fielding.

== Plot ==
The film follows the comic adventures of Joseph Andrews, footman to Lady Booby.

== Cast ==
- Ann-Margret as Lady Booby
- Peter Firth as Joseph Andrews
- Michael Hordern as Parson Adams
- Jim Dale as the Pedlar
- Beryl Reid as Mrs. Slipslop
- Natalie Ogle as Fanny Goodwill
- John Gielgud as the doctor
- Hugh Griffith as Squire Western
- Peter Bull as Sir Thomas Booby
- Karen Dotrice as Pamela
- Peggy Ashcroft as Lady Tattle
- James Villiers as Mr. Booby
- Timothy West as Mr. Tow-Wouse
- Wendy Craig as Mrs. Tow-Wouse
- Ronald Pickup as Mr. Wilson
- Penelope Wilton as Mrs. Wilson
- Kenneth Cranham as the wicked squire
- Norman Rossington as Gaffer Andrews
- Patsy Rowlands as Gammer Andrews
- Vernon Dobtcheff as Fop
- Tim Pigott-Smith as Cornet
- Brian Glover as gaoler

== Production ==
=== Development ===
Paramount announced the film in May 1976.

=== Filming locations ===
The movie was filmed on location at Broughton Castle, Banbury, Oxfordshire, England, at the Roman Baths in Bath, Somerset, England, and at the Royal Crescent in Bath, Somerset, England, the George Inn, Norton St Philip and in other locations in England.

=== Music ===
The ballads were sung by Jim Dale.

== Critical reception ==
Rotten Tomatoes gives it a rating of 45%.

The Monthly Film Bulletin wrote: "Hoping, no doubt, to repeat the box-office success of Tom Jones (Hugh Griffith is called back for a repeat performance as Squire Western), Richardson unhappily misses out all down the line. Firth is no Finney (leaving aside the fact that the insipid Joseph is singularly lacking in Tom's gumption); the sexual encounters are, it seems, motivated more by desperation than exuberance or, in Joseph's case, when he finally makes love to the passive girl, by an incongruously clichéd romanticism; a parade of stars walk on and off, none (like David Warner, as the odious Blifil) leaving more than a momentary impression; the episodes (elegantly linked by the narrator in Tom Jones) tumble randomly on top of each other. ... Fielding's redeeming asides are missing and even the incidental pleasures of Michael Hordern's Parson Adams, a workmanlike, worried-bloodhound performance from an accomplished character actor, cannot offset the sense of déja vu which pervades this musty enterprise."

Sight and Sound wrote: "Joseph Andrews ... was a shamelessly blatant attempt at reviving past glories that reassembled many of the ingrethents behind the Oscar-winning Tom Jones (1963) a Henry Fielding source novel, John Addison score, Hugh Griffith's Rabelaisian Squire Western and some visual innuendo involving asparagus. The later film certainly has its sprightly comic moments, and British star-spotters will be in seventh heaven, but its self-conscious bawdiness becomes wearying when accompanied by little discernible satirical point. Peter Firth and Natalie Ogle are prettily blank-faced as the romantic leads, though Ann-Margret's turn as the scheming Lady Booby shows unexpected range."

Variety wrote: "Joseph Andrews is a tired British period piece about leching and wenching amidst the highand lowlife of Henry Fielding's England. Tony Richardson's film is a ludicrous mix of underplayed bawdiness and sporadic vulgarity. Large cast of otherwise British players is headed by Ann-Margret, sometimes appearing grotesque in her rendition of Lady Booby, the noblewoman-with-a-past with the hots for servant Peter Firth in title role. ... Commercial outlook is thin and uneven."

Vincent Canby of The New York Times wrote: "Joseph Andrews contains more great (and more greatly funny) character performances than any film I've seen in years. It's one of the few movies around now that truly lifts the spirits, not only because it is so good-humored but also because the humor is laced with so much wit and wisdom. ...(Ann-Margret) looks great and she is enchantingly funny, but so is almost everyone else in a cast so big I really don't know where to begin, since I'm sure to leave out someone important. It's one of those films in which even the smaller roles are as beautifully and as memorably done as the larger ones. ...The film is ... an almost perfect blending of beauty, romance and adventure, of landscapes too lovely to believe alternating with the kind of gritty period detail that prompts one character (Squire Thomas) to say of a street jam in the resort city of Bath, 'The only things that move here are the bowels of the horses.'"

Filmink said Ann-Margret "stole the show".

== Accolades ==
Ann-Margret was nominated for a 1978 Golden Globe Award for her performance in the film.

Michael Annals, Patrick Wheatley were nominated for the 1978 BAFTA award for Best Costume Design.
