= Hamlet (1969 film) =

1969 film by Tony Richardson

- Film poster
- Directed by: Tony Richardson
- Written by: Tony Richardson
- Based on: Hamlet; 1599 play by William Shakespeare
- Produced by: Hans Gottschalk; Neil Hartley; Leslie Linder; Martin Ransohoff
- Starring: Nicol Williamson; Marianne Faithfull; Anthony Hopkins; Judy Parfitt
- Cinematography: Gerry Fisher
- Edited by: Charles Rees
- Music by: Patrick Gowers
- Color process: Technicolor
- Production companies: Filmways Pictures; Woodfall Film Productions
- Distributed by: Columbia Pictures
- Release dates: 21 December 1969 (New York City); 9 April 1970 (United Kingdom)
- Running time: 118 minutes
- Country: United Kingdom
- Language: English
- Budget: $350,000

Hamlet is a 1969 British tragedy period drama film directed by Tony Richardson and starring Nicol Williamson, Anthony Hopkins, Judy Parfitt, Marianne Faithfull, Mark Dignam, Gordon Jackson and Michael Pennington. It is a film adaptation of Shakespeare's play Hamlet. It was written by Richardson based on his stage production at the Roundhouse theatre in London.

== Plot ==
Hamlet's father, the king, was killed by Hamlet's uncle Claudius who then married the widowed queen, Gertrude. Hamlet's ghost father visits him and tells Hamlet what happened, so Hamlet swears revenge. He feigns insanity, which worries the Claudius and Gertrude, and Polonius, who is Ophelia's father. Hamlet kills Polonius by mistake, so the Claudius sends him to England to be murdered. Ophelia goes mad because her father is dead, then she drowns in a river. Hamlet survives the plot to take his life. He returns England. Ophelia's brother Laertes challenges Hamlet to a duel, but he poisons the sword. Claudius also poisons some wine for Hamlet, but the queen drinks it instead. Hamlet is stabbed with the poisoned blade but kills Laertes and Claudius before he dies.

== Cast ==
- Nicol Williamson as Hamlet
- Judy Parfitt as Gertrude
- Anthony Hopkins as Claudius
- Marianne Faithfull as Ophelia
- Mark Dignam as Polonius
- Michael Pennington as Laertes
- Gordon Jackson as Horatio
- Ben Aris as Rosencrantz
- Clive Graham as Guildenstern
- Peter Gale as Osric
- Roger Livesey as first player / gravedigger
- John J. Carney as Player King (as John Carney)
- Richard Everett as Player Queen
- Robin Chadwick as Francisco
- Ian Collier as priest
- Michael Elphick as captain
- David Griffith as Messenger (as Mark Griffith)
- Anjelica Huston as Court lady
- Bill Jarvis as Courtier
- Roger Lloyd Pack as Reynaldo (as Roger Lloyd-Pack)
- John Railton as 1st sailor
- John Trenaman as Barnardo
- Jennifer Tudor as Court lady

== Production ==
The film, a departure from big-budget Hollywood renditions of classics, was made with a small budget and a very minimalist set, consisting of Renaissance fixtures and costumes in a dark, shadowed space. A brick tunnel is used for the scenes on the battlements. The Ghost of Hamlet's father is represented only by a light shining on the observers. The film places much emphasis on the sexual aspects of the play, to the point of strongly implying an incestuous relationship between Laertes and Ophelia. Williamson was only one year younger than Parfitt, who played his mother, and was one year older than Hopkins, who played his uncle.

== Reception ==
Nigel Andrews wrote in The Monthly Film Bulletin: "Nicol Williamson intelligently conveys Hamlet's own ambiguities. "What a piece of work is man" has the forced mechanical ring of a humanist creed sapped of all conviction, while the fatalism of the later "Providence" speech rings quietly sincere. And although soliloquy transfers uneasily to the screen – camera here is no substitute for live audience – Williamson's intense absorption and driving intelligence make them seem more than usually like spoken thoughts."

Sight and Sound wrote: "At first glance, Nicol Williamson, bearded and unprincely, seems an unlikely lead, but he gives a superb performance. Anthony Hopkins as Claudius is clearly too young to be his uncle, but matches Williamson for intensity. Richardson films almost entirely in close-up, sets a relentless pace, and is utterly clear in his exposition. Powell and Pressburger fans will appreciate Roger Livesey as the player king and the gravedigger."

== Home media ==
Hamlet was released to DVD by Sony Pictures Home Entertainment on 3 July 2012 via the Choice Collection DVD-on-demand setup from Amazon.
