= Keith Skinner =

British actor, crime historian and writer

- Born: 1949 (age 76–77); England, UK
- Occupations: Former actor, currently historian and author
- Years active: 1966–present

Keith Skinner (born 1949) is a British actor, crime historian and author.

== Acting career ==
He worked as an actor in cinema and television. His career began when he starred as Bruno in the 1966 film Mademoiselle. In 1968, he was cast in Franco Zeffirelli's adaptation of Romeo and Juliet as Balthasar, Romeo's manservant and trusted friend. He appears at various stages in the film including galloping on horseback to tell Romeo (played by Leonard Whiting) of Juliet's "death" and accompanies Romeo back to Verona again on horseback towards the end of the film.

Skinner starred in one episode of The Jazz Age in 1968. He played Harry Lampton in five episodes of the early seventies' TV series Man at the Top and appeared in three episodes of Z-Cars from 1969 to 1972. He went on to appear in an episode of Play for Today, one episode of Out of the Unknown in 1971, two episodes of So it Goes in 1973 and two episodes of Beryl's Lot (1973–1976). In 1976 he appeared in the British musical The Slipper and the Rose: The Story of Cinderella. In 1977, Skinner worked again with Zeffirelli when he played the possessed boy in the TV miniseries Jesus of Nazareth. In 1980, he starred in Frank Loesser's musical Guys and Dolls. In 1985, Skinner appeared in an episode of Doctor Who.

== Career as crime historian and author ==
From an early age, Skinner developed an interest in the history of Jack the Ripper. As an adult, he started researching his own family history and undertook more thorough research on the Ripper as well. From there, he moved on to the history of the Metropolitan Police and he is now an established crime historian and author.

In 2001, he worked on the film From Hell as an historical consultant. He also worked as a historical researcher and consultant for the documentaries The Hunt (2001) and Hunt For Jack the Ripper (2001).

He has also co-authored a number of historical books:

- The Ripper Legacy: Life and Death of Jack the Ripper by Martin Howells and Keith Skinner (1987)
- Peasenhall Murder by Martin Fido and Keith Skinner (1990)
- Scotland Yard Files: 150 Years of the CID, 1842–1992 by Paul Begg and Keith Skinner (1992)
- The Jack the Ripper A-Z by Paul Begg, Martin Fido and Keith Skinner (1992, 1996)
- The Jack the Ripper Whitechapel Murders by Keith Skinner and Kevin O'Donnell (1997)
- The Official Encyclopedia of Scotland Yard by Martin Fido and Keith Skinner (1999)
- The Last Victim: Extraordinary Life of Florence Maybrick, the Only Woman to Survive Jack the Ripper by Keith Skinner, Anne E. Graham and Carol Emmas (1999)
- The Ultimate Jack the Ripper Companion by Stewart P. Evans and Keith Skinner (2000)
- The Ultimate Jack the Ripper Sourcebook: An Illustrated Encyclopedia by Stewart P. Evans and Keith Skinner (2002)
- Jack the Ripper and the Whitechapel Murders (Document Pack) by Stewart P. Evans and Keith Skinner (2002)
- The Ripper Diary by Seth Linder, Caroline Morris and Keith Skinner (2003)
- The Scotland Yard Files: Milestones in Crime Detection by Keith Skinner and Alan Moss (31 Aug 2006)
- The Complete Jack the Ripper A-Z by Paul Begg, Martin Fido and Keith Skinner (2010)
- Jack the Ripper: Letters from Hell by Stewart P Evans and Keith Skinner (2002, 2004, 2013)
- The Victorian Detective (Shire Library) by Alan Moss and Keith Skinner (2013)
- The Crime Museum Casebook: An Encyclopedia of Scotland Yard's Investigations by Alan Moss and Keith Skinner (2016)
