= The Sailor from Gibraltar =

1967 British film by Tony Richardson

- French theatrical poster
- Directed by: Tony Richardson
- Written by: Marguerite Duras (novel); Christopher Isherwood; Tony Richardson; Don Magner
- Produced by: Oscar Lewenstein
- Starring: Jeanne Moreau; Ian Bannen; Vanessa Redgrave; Hugh Griffith; Orson Welles; Ziya Mohyeddin
- Cinematography: Raoul Coutard
- Edited by: Antony Gibbs
- Music by: Antoine Duhamel
- Production company: Woodfall Film Productions
- Distributed by: United Artists
- Release dates: 24 April 1967 (USA); 21 July 1967 (UK)
- Running time: 88 minutes
- Country: United Kingdom
- Language: English
- Box office: $215,000

The Sailor from Gibraltar is a 1967 British romantic drama film directed by Tony Richardson and starring Jeanne Moreau, Ian Bannen, Vanessa Redgrave, Hugh Griffith and Orson Welles. Based on the novel Le Marin de Gibraltar by Marguerite Duras, it tells the story of a mysterious wealthy woman who travels the world in her yacht in search of a lost lover she calls “the sailor from Gibraltar”.

== Plot ==
Bored with his fiancée Sheila and with Florence, where they have gone for a holiday, Alan takes her to Bocca di Magra where he meets and sleeps with Anna, a rich woman whose yacht is anchored offshore. When she leaves next day, she agrees to take him as her lover. An odyssey begins as she pursues alleged sightings of “the sailor from Gibraltar”, a man she regards as the love of her life. Initially bored or annoyed over her obsession, Alan eventually succumbs to the quest. After drawing blank in Greece and in Ethiopia, a third false lead in Alexandria, Egypt, dents Anna's overriding will to continue. Once she shows vulnerability, Alan realises that he loves her and wants to stay searching pointlessly with her.

== Cast ==
- Jeanne Moreau as Anna
- Ian Bannen as Alan
- Vanessa Redgrave as Sheila
- Orson Welles as Louis de Mozambique
- Hugh Griffith as Llewellyn
- Zia Mohyeddin as Noori
- Umberto Orsini as postcard vendor
- Eleonora Brown as Carla

== Critical reception ==
The Monthly Film Bulletin wrote: "Faced by this incredible farrago of philosophico-romantic tosh – where the mysterious sailor turns out to be an all-purpose symbol of human love and desire – one can only turn unbelievingly back to the novel to see whether Marguerite Duras could possibly have perpetrated anything quite so absurd. There one finds a delicately nuanced character study, so carefully detailed that myth and reality shade into each other. But in Tony Richardson's very literalminded adaptation, all subtlety has been ironed out, leaving only one of those fulsome stories in which two hungering souls merely have to look at each other to find themselves borne along on the wings of a beautiful grand amour. After a brief introductory period in which Ian Bannen glumly contemplates Vanessa Redgrave's eager culture-vulture, he turns no less glumly (but apparently more fruitfully) to Jeanne Moreau, who drapes herself about the rigging, disburses one of her looks every now and again, and in general exudes mysterious desirability. So it goes on till the end of the film, with brief interruptions from Orson Welles (gabbling a few incomprehensible lines), Zia Mohyeddin (doing a passable Peter Sellers imitation) and Hugh Griffith (muttering apocalyptically in the African jungle). 'It's just like a movie', the hero comments a propos of the quest for the elusive sailor: would that it were."

Time Out commended Raoul Coutard's camerawork, but dismissed the film as "Highfalutin nonsense".

Derek Winnert found it "well-intentioned, weird, arty stuff in the style of the time. Director Tony Richardson turns it into a smart, interesting film that’s always intriguing even if it is not entirely a success."
