= Fanny Carby =

British character actress (1925–2002)

- Born: 2 February 1925; Sutton Coldfield, Birmingham, Warwickshire, England
- Died: 20 September 2002 (aged 77); London, UK
- Occupation: Actress
- Spouse: Roderick Horne

Fanny Carby (2 February 1925 – 20 September 2002) was a British character actress. She had two different roles on Coronation Street: she played Mary Hornigold in 1965, then in 1987 she took the role of Vera Duckworth's domineering mother, Amy Burton, a role she played into the following year. Fanny's other credits include Street spin-off Pardon the Expression, On The Buses, Sykes, The Bill, In Sickness and in Health and Goodnight Sweetheart.

On stage, she was a founder member of Joan Littlewood's Theatre Workshop, and appeared in Oh, What a Lovely War in London and on Broadway; and also in its film version, for director Richard Attenborough.

== Selected filmography ==
- Operation Diplomat (1952, TV Series) as Mrs. Dobson
- The Pickwick Papers (1952-1953, TV Series) as Mary
- BBC Sunday-Night Theatre (1952-1959, TV Series) as Prostitute / Waitress / Maisie / Party guest / Joan / Agnes / Gwen
- Meet Mr. Lucifer (1953) as Lady in Street (uncredited)
- The Million Pound Note (1954) as Nursemaid in Belgrave Square (uncredited)
- Father Brown (1954) as Prostitute in Police Van (uncredited)
- Lost (1956) as Nanny in the Park (uncredited)
- Theatre Royal (1956, TV Series) as Neighbour
- ITV Play of the Week (1956, TV Series) as Nurse
- Women Without Men (1956) as Brooker (uncredited)
- Blonde Bait (1956) as Brooker (uncredited)
- The Crime of the Century (1956, TV Series) as Waitress
- The Secret Place (1957) as Woman with Pram (uncredited)
- Love and Mr. Lewisham (1959, TV Series) as Girl Student
- The Kitchen (1961) as Winnie
- Never Back Losers (1961) as Charwoman
- The Edgar Wallace Mystery Theatre (1962, TV Series) as Mrs. Wall
- The Traitors (1962) as Angry Mother in Surgery
- Some People (1962) as Johnnie's Mother
- Maigret (1962, TV Series) as Concierge
- The Share Out (1962) as Mrs. Wall
- Sparrows Can't Sing (1963) as Lil
- What a Crazy World (1963) as Dolly
- Crossroads (1981, TV Series) as Rene Haines
- Pardon the Expression (1965-1966) as Mrs. Field / Fiona McBride
- The Idol (1966) as Barmaid
- Out of the Unknown (1966, TV Series) as Miss Mitkin
- The Family Way (1966) as Mrs. Stone
- Adam Adamant Lives! (1967, TV Series) as Dolly
- Till Death Us Do Part (1967, TV Series) as Woman
- How I Won the War (1967) as Mrs. Clapper
- The White Bus (1967) as a Supporter
- Mrs Thursday (1967, TV Series) as Agnes Blakey
- Journey to the Unknown (1968, TV Series) as Housekeeper (uncredited)
- I Start Counting (1969) as minor role (uncredited)
- Oh! What a Lovely War (1969) as Mill Girl
- Junket 89 (1970) as Mrs. Trowser-Legge
- Nearest and Dearest (1970) as Marlene Fitton
- One Brief Summer (1971) as Mrs. Shaw
- On the Buses (1971, TV Series) as Gladys
- A Day in the Death of Joe Egg (1972) as Nun
- The Trouble with 2B (1972) as Miss Greenleaf
- Love Thy Neighbour (1974, TV Series) as Eddie's Mother In Law
- The Sweeney (1978) S4E1 as Dot Plummer
- Let's Get Laid (1978) as Lady in Phone Booth
- The Elephant Man (1980) as Mrs. Kendal's Dresser
- Loophole (1981) as Cleaning Lady
- Fanny Hill (1983) as Old wench (uncredited)
- Cockles (1984, TV series) as Madame Rosa
- Lassiter (1986) as Old Lady
- Bert Rigby, You're a Fool (1989) as Aunt Aggie
- Mrs Dalloway (1997) as Singer
