= David Watkin (cinematographer) =

English cinematographer (1925–2008)

- Born: 23 March 1925; Margate, Kent, England
- Died: 19 February 2008 (aged 82); Brighton, East Sussex, England
- Occupation: Cinematographer
- Years active: 1963–2001

David Watkin BSC (23 March 1925 – 19 February 2008) was an English cinematographer, an innovator who was among the first directors of photography to experiment heavily with the usage of bounce light as a soft light source. He worked with such film directors as Richard Lester, Peter Brook, Tony Richardson, Mike Nichols, Ken Russell, Franco Zeffirelli, Sidney Lumet and Sydney Pollack.

In 1985, Watkin won the Academy Award for Best Cinematography for his work on Out of Africa. He received lifetime achievement awards in 2004 from the British Society of Cinematographers and the cinematographic-centric Camerimage Film Festival in Łódź, Poland.

In Chariots of Fire, he "helped create one of the most memorable images of 1980s cinema: the opening sequence in which a huddle of young male athletes pounds along the water's edge on a beach" to the film's theme music by Vangelis.

== Early life and career ==
Watkin was born in Margate, Kent, England, the fourth and youngest son of a Roman Catholic solicitor father and housewife mother, and grew up within a well-to-do upper-middle class household. He gained an early enthusiasm for European classical music, which was left to be satisfied only as a passive listener when his father rejected his request for a piano and lessons; Watkin always contended that he would rather have been a professional musician than a cinematographer.

After a brief period in the Army during World War II, Watkin started work at the Southern Railway Film Unit in 1948 as a camera assistant. After the unit was absorbed into British Transport Films in 1950, he eventually climbed the ranks up to director of photography at BTF before going off to work freelance in commercials around 1960.

Before working in feature films "as a fully fledged cinematographer", he shot the title sequence of the James Bond film, Goldfinger (1964) for Robert Brownjohn.

== Work with Richard Lester ==
It was on a commercial shoot that he met Richard Lester, who hired him for his feature film, The Knack …and How to Get It (1965) which won the Palme d'Or at Cannes. The two men subsequently worked together on Help! (1965), How I Won the War (1967), The Bed-Sitting Room (1969), The Three Musketeers (1973), The Four Musketeers (1974), Robin and Marian (1976) and Cuba (1979).

== Watkin's casual approach ==
He was noted for his very casual approach; when asked when he first developed a passion for photography, he answered that he hadn't yet (his main passions being classical music and books). However, filmmaking did have an attraction because, as he said, "I knew filmmakers didn't have to wear a suit".

He also has a rather famous habit of sleeping on-set in between lighting setups, because "it's the only thing you can do on-set which doesn't make you more tired". This habit was humorously referenced in Night Falls on Manhattan (1996), which he shot, where he has a brief cameo towards the beginning as a sleeping judge. In the case of the film of Marat/Sade (1967), problems with a tight shooting schedule and restricted set space were innovatively resolved through the use of one single lighting set-up for the entirety of the film – a translucent wall lit by twenty-six 10 kW lamps as the sole source of light.

== Style and technique ==
He was generally recognised for the "painterly qualities" in his work with some critics comparing him with Vermeer, the Dutch artist "who often illuminated his subjects with light refracted through windows".

In Out of Africa he broke with tradition and "used fast film for exteriors and slow film for night and interiors. This typically maverick move gave Sydney Pollack's film a lush, soft quality that matched its romantic mood".

=== Conception of a new lighting technique ===
Watkin also conceived the idea for a new light which would tackle the problem of light falloff during night shoots. Because of the inverse square law, light from even moderately strong sources starts to fall off fairly quickly as the subject walks away from the light source. Therefore, films shooting at night had the problem of trying to hide light sources in places which would be out of shot but maintain a fairly constant level of illumination over any amount of distance (and thus not indicate a large lamp as a light source). But this time-consuming approach created problems with multiple shadows of divergent angles.

His solution was to build a large array of tightly spaced Fay lights in a 14 x 14 square (196 lights total), which was then elevated 150 feet (46 m) high on a cherry picker placed roughly a quarter of a mile away. Due to the long distance between the light and the actors and the high luminescence of this light array, the actors could walk across long distances without the intensity of the light hitting them seeming to vary. Subsequently, the array was named the "Wendy-light" in his honour – Watkin, who was gay, used the camp name "Wendy".

== Personal life ==
David Watkin lived in his adopted home town of Brighton, East Sussex, when he wasn't working on a "picture". He had a personal library of mostly First Edition 18th Century literature.

He was openly gay.

== Death ==
David Watkin died, aged 82, at his home in Sussex Mews, Brighton on 19 February 2008, having been diagnosed with prostate cancer just six months previously.

== Publications ==
His autobiographies, Why Is There Only One Word for Thesaurus?, first published in 1998 and the second volume, Was Clara Schumann a Fag Hag?, published in 2008, by Scrutineer Publishing, were both designed by his good friend the artist and designer Rachael Adams.

== Awards and honours ==
List of awards and nominations
Ceremony	Category	Year	Film	Result
Academy Awards	Best Cinematography	1986	Out of Africa	Won
British Academy Film Awards	Best British Cinematography	1966	Help!, The Knack...and How to Get It	Nominated
British Academy Film Awards	Best British Cinematography	1968	Mademoiselle	Nominated
British Academy Film Awards	Best Cinematography	1969	The Charge of the Light Brigade	Nominated
British Academy Film Awards	Best Cinematography	1971	Catch-22	Nominated
British Academy Film Awards	Best Cinematography	1975	The Three Musketeers	Nominated
British Academy Film Awards	Best Cinematography	1982	Chariots of Fire	Nominated
British Academy Film Awards	Best Cinematography	1987	Out of Africa	Won
British Academy Television Awards	Best Film Cameraman	1978	Jesus of Nazareth (shared with Armando Nannuzzi)	Nominated

== Selected filmography ==
Director of photography

=== Film ===
Year	Title	Director	Award	Notes
1965	The Knack ...and How to Get It	Richard Lester		First collaboration with Richard Lester
1965	Help!	Richard Lester		Second collaboration with Richard Lester
1966	Mademoiselle	Tony Richardson		First collaboration with Tony Richardson
1967	Marat/Sade	Peter Brook		
1967	How I Won the War	Richard Lester		Third collaboration with Richard Lester
1968	The Charge of the Light Brigade	Tony Richardson		Second collaboration with Tony Richardson
1969	The Bed Sitting Room	Richard Lester		Fourth collaboration with Richard Lester
1970	Catch-22	Mike Nichols		
1971	The Devils	Ken Russell		First collaboration with Ken Russell
1971	The Boy Friend	Ken Russell		Second collaboration with Ken Russell
1973	The Homecoming	Peter Hall		
1973	Yellow Dog	Terence Donovan		
1973	A Delicate Balance	Tony Richardson		Third collaboration with Tony Richardson
1973	The Three Musketeers	Richard Lester		Fifth collaboration with Richard Lester
1974	The Four Musketeers	Richard Lester		Sixth collaboration with Richard Lester
1975	Mahogany	Berry Gordy		
1976	To the Devil a Daughter	Peter Sykes		
1976	Robin and Marian	Richard Lester		Seventh collaboration with Richard Lester
1977	Joseph Andrews	Tony Richardson		Fourth collaboration with Tony Richardson
1979	Hanover Street	Peter Hyams		
1979	That Summer!	Harley Cokeliss		
1979	Cuba	Richard Lester		Eighth collaboration with Richard Lester
1981	Chariots of Fire	Hugh Hudson		
1981	Endless Love	Franco Zeffirelli		Second collaboration with Franco Zeffirelli
1982	La Cenerentola	Jean-Pierre Ponnelle		
1983	Yentl	Barbra Streisand		
1984	The Hotel New Hampshire	Tony Richardson		Fifth collaboration with Tony Richardson
1985	Return to Oz	Walter Murch		
1985	White Nights	Taylor Hackford		
1985	Out of Africa	Sydney Pollack	Academy Award for Cinematography	
1986	Sky Bandits	Zoran Perisic		
1987	Moonstruck	Norman Jewison		First collaboration with Norman Jewison
1988	Masquerade	Bob Swaim		
1988	Journey to the Center of the Earth	Rusty Lemorande; Albert Pyun		
1988	The Good Mother	Leonard Nimoy		
1988	Last Rites	Donald P. Bellisario		
1990	Memphis Belle	Michael Caton-Jones		First collaboration with Michael Caton-Jones
1990	Hamlet	Franco Zeffirelli		Third collaboration with Franco Zeffirelli
1991	The Object of Beauty	Michael Lindsay-Hogg		Second collaboration with Michael Lindsay-Hogg
1991	The Cabinet of Dr. Ramirez	Peter Sellars		
1992	Used People	Beeban Kidron		
1993	This Boy's Life	Michael Caton-Jones		Second collaboration with Michael Caton-Jones
1993	Bopha!	Morgan Freeman		
1994	Milk Money	Richard Benjamin		
1996	Jane Eyre	Franco Zeffirelli		Fourth collaboration with Franco Zeffirelli
1996	Bogus	Norman Jewison		Second collaboration with Norman Jewison
1996	Night Falls on Manhattan	Sidney Lumet		First collaboration with Sidney Lumet
1997	Through Roses	Jürgen Flimm		
1997	Obsession	Peter Sehr		
1997	Critical Care	Sidney Lumet		Second collaboration with Sidney Lumet
1999	Gloria	Sidney Lumet		Third collaboration with Sidney Lumet
1999	Tea with Mussolini	Franco Zeffirelli		Fifth collaboration with Franco Zeffirelli
2001	Lover's Prayer	Reverge Anselmo		

Actor

Year	Title	Director	Role	Notes
1996	Night Falls on Manhattan	Sidney Lumet	Sleeping Judge	Uncredited

Camera and electrical department

Year	Title	Director	Role	Notes
1964	Goldfinger	Guy Hamilton	Cinematographer: Title sequence	Uncredited

=== Short films ===
Year	Title	Director
1963	The Six-Sided Triangle	Christopher Miles

=== TV movies ===
Year	Title	Director	Notes
1966	One-Eyed Jacks Are Wild	Franklin J. Schaffner	
1977	Jesus of Nazareth	Franco Zeffirelli	First collaboration with Franco Zeffirelli
1989	Murder by Moonlight	Michael Lindsay-Hogg	First collaboration with Michael Lindsay-Hogg

=== TV series ===
Year	Title	Notes
1977	Jesus of Nazareth	4 episodes
