= Mace-bearer =

Royal court official with a ceremonial or real mace

A mace-bearer, or macebearer, is a person who carries a mace, either a ceremonial one or a real weapon.

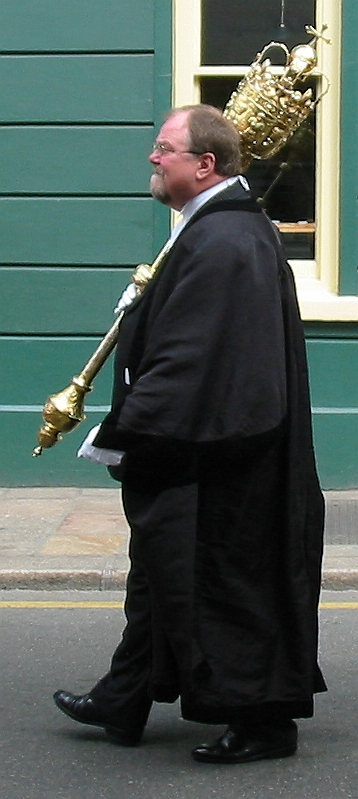
One of the functions of the Viscount of Jersey is to act as mace-bearer for the Bailiff of Jersey.

== Armed ==
When the mace was still in actual use as a weapon, it was deemed fit for close protection, and hence a mace-bearer could be a bodyguard.

Thus in French and Dutch, a massier (armed with a masse d'armes 'weapon-mace') could be a member of a formally so-styled guard corps, as in the court of the Dukes of Brabant.

In Spain, a macero were originally an armed guard protecting the King of Castile; they were called macero due to the weapon they wielded, a maza (i.e., a mace).

Otherwise, a normally more domestic servant could double (arming trusted household staff was not unusual) as macebearer, as in the case of the prophet Mohammed's first muezzin, Bilal ibn Ribah

== Ceremonial ==
A ceremonial mace symbolises the power or status of a monarch, institution or high dignitary. A swordbearer is similar to a mace-bearer but carries a ceremonial sword rather than a ceremonial mace. The duty to carry ceremonial weapons in procession or other formal occasions may either be occasional and vested in an office otherwise named, or give its name to the office, either as a sinecure or in conjunction with other duties (sometimes indeed as an alternative title, as with some university officers, e.g. at St Andrews, the Bedelis is the chief mace bearer and at Oxford the bedels). His main day-to-day duties may be rather that of a general assistant, like say a driver's. In the Anglo-Saxon tradition, there usually is one post of mace-bearer per mace, and rarely more than one mace in use at the same time per master, or only in specific different contexts.

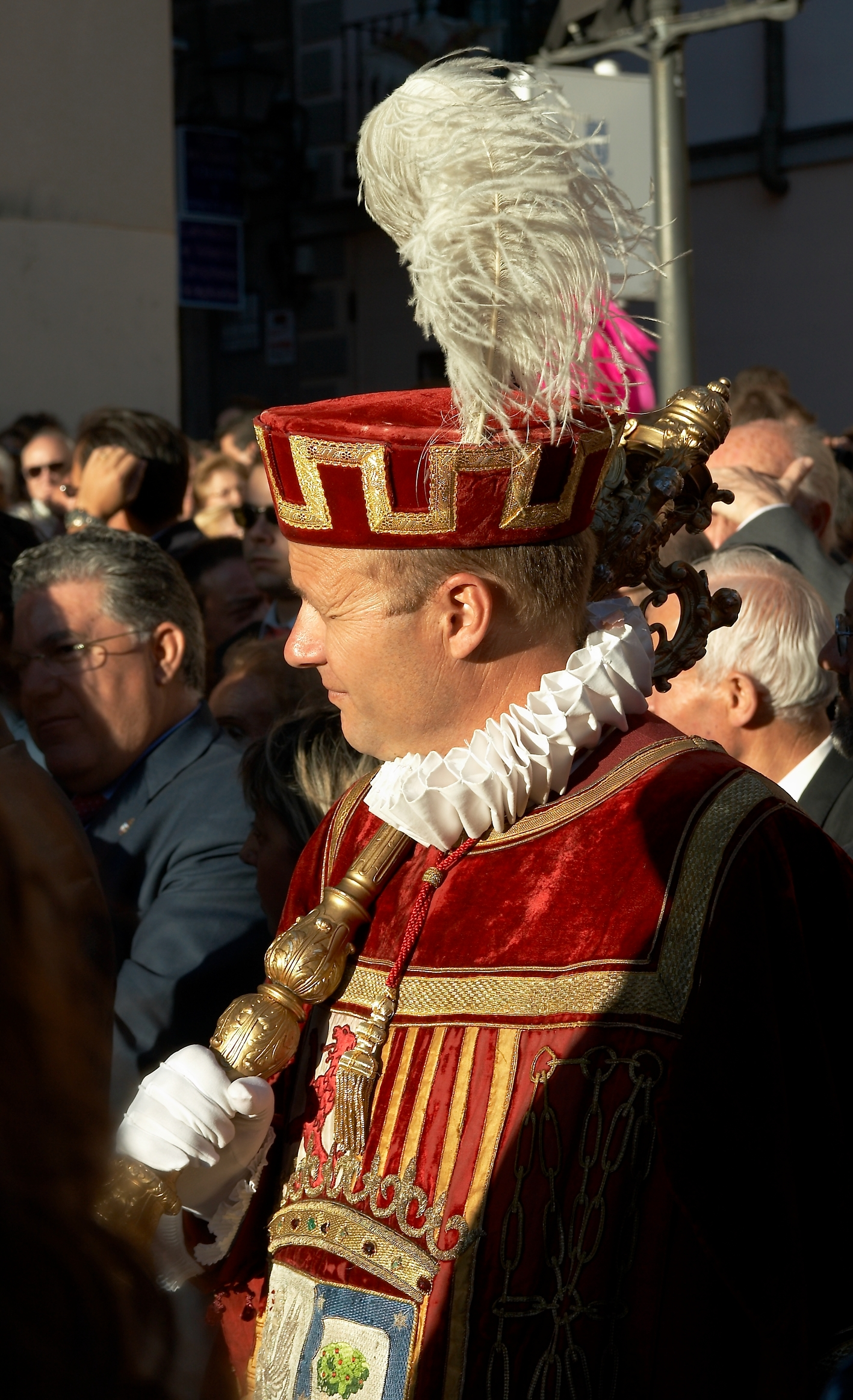
Spanish macero bearing a tabard with the coat of arms of the city of Madrid.

In French, the above-mentioned title massier is nowadays used for a mere huissier (a lowly post, door-keeper or usher) who occasionally carries a 'masse' when taking part in formal ceremonies, rather like a staff of office, as the mace is not given the same reverence as in the Anglo-Saxon tradition, indeed there may be several ones carried at the same time by staff of the same master, without any symbolism or tradition concerning the individual maces.

In Spain, the macero mentioned above evolved to become the symbol of civil authority, usually associated with extra-royal institutions such as municipalities, local authorities, etc. When these institutions celebrate a formal ceremony, the macero will head any parade or surround the figures of authority. Similar to the French case, albeit they always wield a 'maza' (a mace), the mace itself does not bear the ceremonial reverence it does in the Anglo-Saxon tradition. Typically, the maceros are dressed in characteristic 15th century garment, and wear a tabard with the coat of arms of the institution they represent.

In the United Kingdom many municipalities appoint a mace-bearer, sometimes titled Sergeant-at-Mace or the more traditional spelling Serjeant-at-Mace.

== See also ==
- Bearer of the Mace in Han Dynasty
- Serjeant-at-arms
- Ceremonial maces in the United Kingdom
