= Woodfall Film Productions =

Woodfall Film Productions was a British film production company established in the late 1950s. It was established by Tony Richardson, John Osborne and Harry Saltzman to make a screen adaptation of Osborne's hit play Look Back in Anger. The film version, directed by Richardson and produced by Saltzman, was released in 1959.

Following its critical success, Woodfall, under the effective control of Richardson, produced several of the most significant British films of the 1960s. These include Saturday Night and Sunday Morning (1960), A Taste of Honey (1961) and The Loneliness of the Long Distance Runner (1962). A later Woodfall film, Tom Jones (1963), won four Academy Awards in 1964. According to film director Desmond Davis, Woodfall Films brought a new era of realism to British films, strongly influenced by the French nouvelle vague.

Woodfall became dormant after Richardson's death in 1991, but in 2014 his surviving family agreed that the films be restored and acquired the copyrights. In 2018, the British Film Institute published a box set of eight of the most significant Woodfall films, Woodfall - A Revolution in British Cinema, and ran a series of public showings.

== Filmography ==
- Look Back in Anger (1959)
- The Entertainer (1960)
- Saturday Night and Sunday Morning (1960)
- A Taste of Honey (1961)
- The Loneliness of the Long Distance Runner (1962)
- Tom Jones (1963)
- Girl with Green Eyes (1964)
- One Way Pendulum (1964)
- The Knack ...and How to Get It (1965)
- Mademoiselle (1966)
- The Sailor from Gibraltar (1967)
- The White Bus (1967)
- Red, White and Zero (1967)
- The Charge of the Light Brigade (1968)
- Inadmissible Evidence (1968)
- Laughter in the Dark (1969)
- Hamlet (1969)
- Kes (1969)
- Ned Kelly (1970)
- Dead Cert (1974)
- Joseph Andrews (1977)
- The Hotel New Hampshire (1984)
