= Tony Richardson =

English theatre director and filmmaker (1928–1991)

- Born: Cecil Antonio Richardson; 5 June 1928; Shipley, West Riding of Yorkshire, England
- Died: 14 November 1991 (aged 63); Los Angeles, California, U.S.
- Education: Wadham College, Oxford
- Occupations: Director; film producer; screenwriter
- Years active: 1952–1991
- Spouse: Vanessa Redgrave (m. 1962; div. 1967)
- Children: 3, including Natasha and Joely
- Relatives: Daisy Bevan (granddaughter); Micheál Richardson (grandson)

Cecil Antonio Richardson (5 June 1928 – 14 November 1991) was an English theatre director and filmmaker, whose career spanned five decades. He was identified with the "angry young men" group of British directors and playwrights during the 1950s, and was later a key figure in the British New Wave filmmaking movement.

His films Look Back in Anger (1959), The Entertainer (1960), A Taste of Honey (1961), and The Loneliness of the Long Distance Runner (1962) are considered classics of kitchen sink realism. He won the 1964 Academy Awards for Best Director and Best Picture for the film Tom Jones. He was also a two-time BAFTA Award winner, and was twice nominated for the Palme d'Or.

With his wife Vanessa Redgrave, Richardson had two daughters, actresses Natasha Richardson and Joely Richardson.

== Life and career ==
=== Early years and education ===
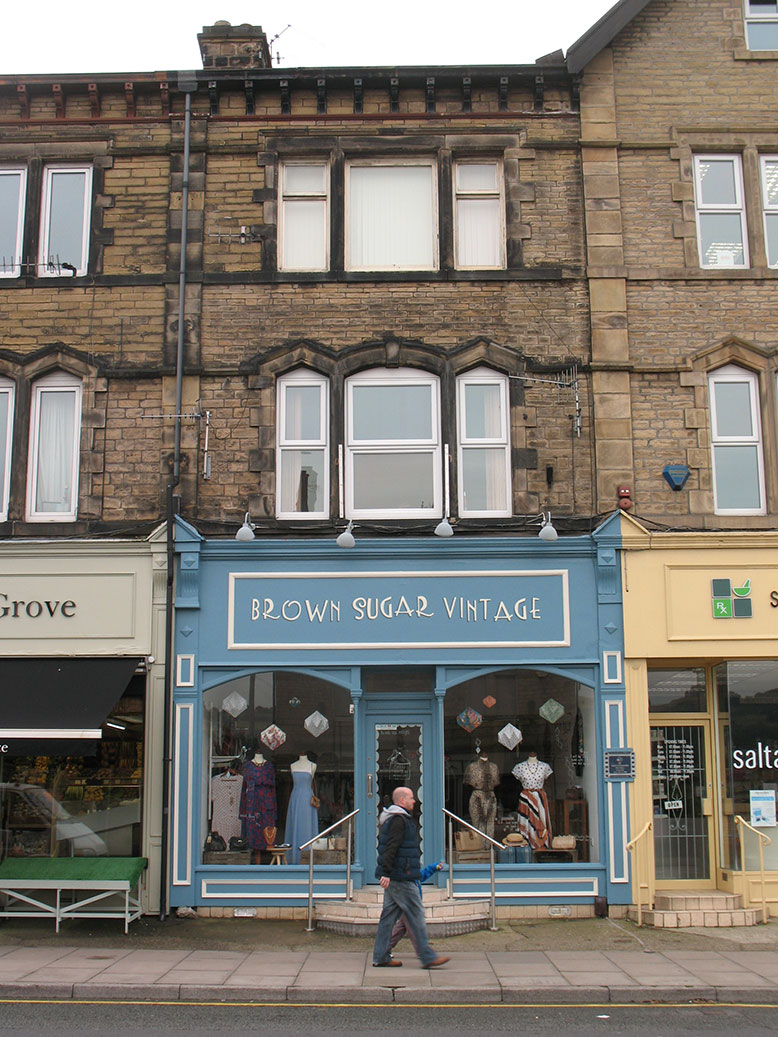
Richardson's house from 1928 to 1948, 28 Bingley Road, Saltaire, Shipley

Richardson was born in Shipley, West Riding of Yorkshire in 1928 to Clarence Albert Richardson, a chemist, and his wife, Elsie Evans (née Campion). He lived on the edge of Saltaire as a young child and kept grass snakes with his childhood friend Joan Naylor. He was Head Boy at Ashville College, Harrogate and attended Wadham College, University of Oxford. His Oxford contemporaries included Rupert Murdoch, Margaret Thatcher, Kenneth Tynan, Lindsay Anderson and Gavin Lambert. He had the unprecedented distinction of being president of both the Oxford University Dramatic Society and the Experimental Theatre Club (the ETC), in addition to being the theatre critic for the university magazine Isis. Those he cast in his student productions included Shirley Williams (as Cordelia), John Schlesinger, Nigel Davenport and Robert Robinson.

=== Career ===
In 1955, in his directing debut, Richardson produced Jean Giraudoux's The Apollo of Bellac for television with Denholm Elliott and Natasha Parry in the main roles. Around the same time he began to be active in Britain's Free Cinema movement, co-directing the non-fiction short Momma Don't Allow (also 1955) with Karel Reisz.

Part of the British "New Wave" of directors, he was involved in the formation of the English Stage Company, along with his close friend George Goetschius and George Devine. He directed John Osborne's play Look Back in Anger at the Royal Court Theatre, and in the same period he directed Shakespeare in Stratford-upon-Avon. Then in 1957 he directed Laurence Olivier as Archie Rice in Osborne's next play The Entertainer, again for the Royal Court.

In 1959, Richardson co-founded Woodfall Film Productions with John Osborne and producer Harry Saltzman, and, as Woodfall's debut, directed the film version of Look Back in Anger (1959), his first feature film. The Entertainer (1960), A Taste of Honey (1961), and The Loneliness of the Long Distance Runner (1962), based on the novel by Alan Sillitoe, also were produced by Woodfall.

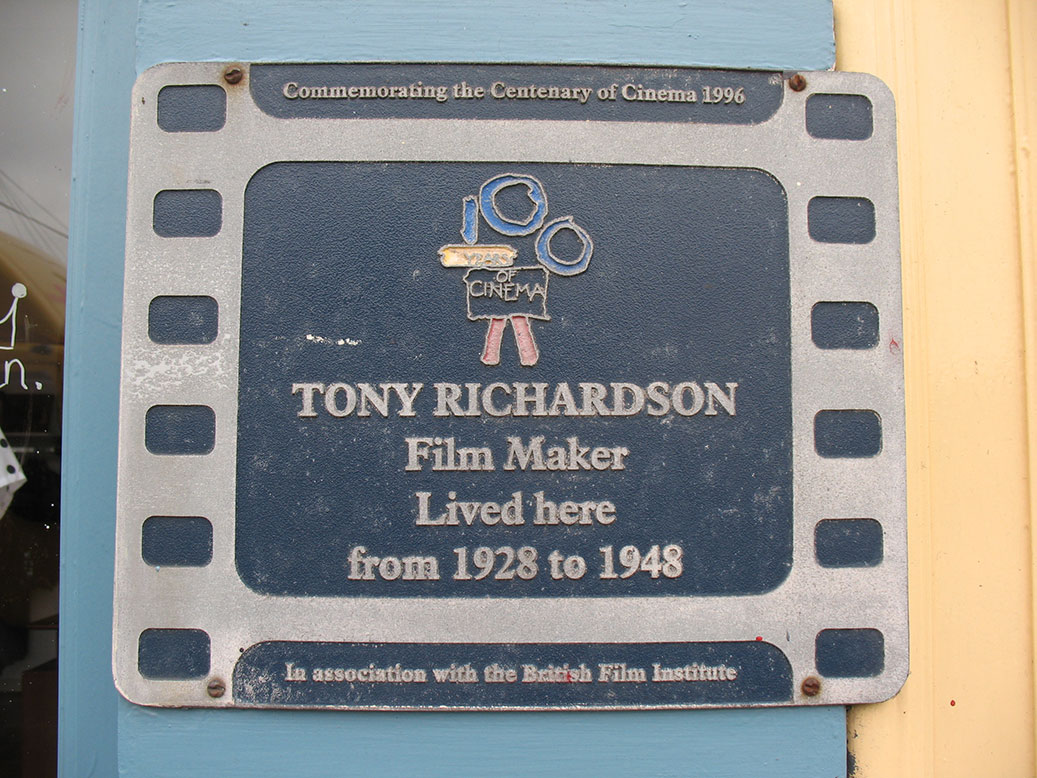
BFI plaque commemorating Richardson's contribution to cinema

Many of Richardson's films, such as A Taste of Honey and The Loneliness of the Long Distance Runner, were part of the acclaimed kitchen sink realism movement popular in Britain at the time, and several of his films continue to be held as cornerstones of the movement.

In 1964, Richardson received two Academy Awards (Best Director and Best Picture) for Tom Jones (1963) based on the novel by Henry Fielding. In the same year he also joined the Who Killed Kennedy? committee set up by Bertrand Russell.

His next film was The Loved One (1965), in which he worked with established stars, including John Gielgud, Rod Steiger and Robert Morse, and worked in Hollywood both on location and on the sound stage. In his autobiography, he confesses that he did not share the general admiration of Haskell Wexler, who worked on The Loved One as both director of photography and a producer.

Among stars that Richardson directed were Jeanne Moreau, Orson Welles, Rob Lowe, Milton Berle, Trevor Howard, David Hemmings, Nicol Williamson, Tom Courtenay, Lynn Redgrave, Marianne Faithfull, Richard Burton, Jodie Foster, Anthony Hopkins, Mick Jagger, Katharine Hepburn, Seth Green, Tommy Lee Jones and Judi Dench. His musical composers included Antoine Duhamel, John Addison and Shel Silverstein. His screenwriters were Jean Genet, Christopher Isherwood, Terry Southern, Marguerite Duras, Edward Bond (adapting Vladimir Nabokov) and Edward Albee. Richardson and Osborne eventually fell out during production of the film Charge of the Light Brigade (1968). The basic issue was Osborne's unwillingness to go through the rewrite process, more arduous in film than it is in the theatre. Richardson had a different version. In his autobiography (p. 195), he writes that Osborne was angry at being replaced in a small role by Laurence Harvey to whom the producers had obligations. Osborne took literary revenge by creating a fictionalised and pseudonymous Richardson – a domineering and arrogant character whom everyone hated – in his play The Hotel in Amsterdam.

Richardson's work was stylistically varied. Mademoiselle (1966) was shot noir-style on location in rural France with a static camera, monochrome film stock and no music. The Charge of the Light Brigade (1968) was part epic and part animated feature. Ned Kelly (1970) was what might be called an Aussie-western. Laughter in the Dark (1969) and A Delicate Balance (1973) were psycho-dramas. Joseph Andrews (1977), based on another novel by Henry Fielding, was a return to the mood of Tom Jones.

In 1970, Richardson was set to direct a film about Vaslav Nijinsky with a script by Edward Albee. It was to have starred Rudolf Nureyev as Nijinsky, Claude Jade as Romola and Paul Scofield as Diaghilev, but producer Harry Saltzman cancelled the project during pre-production.

In 1974, he travelled to Los Angeles to work on a script (never produced) with Sam Shepard, and took up residence there. Later that year, he began work on Mahogany (1975), starring Diana Ross, but was fired by Motown head Berry Gordy shortly after production began, owing to creative differences.

He wrote and directed the comedy-drama The Hotel New Hampshire (1984), based on John Irving's novel of the same name and starring Jodie Foster, Beau Bridges and Rob Lowe. Although it was a box-office failure, the film received a positive critical reception.

Richardson made four more major films before his death. His last, Blue Sky (1994), was not released for nearly three years after he died. Jessica Lange won a Best Actress Oscar for her performance in the film.

In 1966, Richardson is alleged to have financed the escape from Wormwood Scrubs prison of the spy and double agent George Blake.

=== Personal life and death ===
Richardson was married to English actress Vanessa Redgrave from 1962 to 1967. The couple had two daughters, Natasha (1963–2009) and Joely (born 1965). Richardson then left Redgrave for French actress and singer Jeanne Moreau. In 1972, he had a relationship with Grizelda Grimond, who was a secretary for Richardson's former business partner Oscar Lewenstein and the daughter of British politician Jo Grimond. Grizelda Grimond gave birth to his daughter, Katherine Grimond, on 8 January 1973.

Richardson was bisexual. He died of complications from AIDS on 14 November 1991 at the age of 63.

== Works ==
=== Film ===
Short film

Year	Title	Director	Writer	Notes
1955	Momma Don't Allow	Yes	Yes	Co-directed with Karel Reisz
1967	Red and Blue	Yes	No	Segment of Red, White and Zero
1990	Hills Like White Elephants	Yes	No	Segment of Women & Men: Stories of Seduction

Feature film

Year	Title	Director	Writer	Producer	Notes
1959	Look Back in Anger	Yes	No	No	
1960	The Entertainer	Yes	No	No	
1960	Saturday Night and Sunday Morning	No	No	Yes	
1961	Sanctuary	Yes	No	No	
1961	A Taste of Honey	Yes	Yes	Yes	
1962	The Loneliness of the Long Distance Runner	Yes	No	Yes	
1963	Tom Jones	Yes	No	Yes	Academy Award for Best Picture; Academy Award for Best Director
1964	Girl with Green Eyes	No	No	Yes	
1965	The Loved One	Yes	No	No	
1966	Mademoiselle	Yes	No	No	
1967	The Sailor from Gibraltar	Yes	Yes	No	
1968	The Charge of the Light Brigade	Yes	No	No	
1969	Laughter in the Dark	Yes	No	No	
1969	Hamlet	Yes	Yes	No	
1970	Ned Kelly	Yes	Yes	No	
1973	A Delicate Balance	Yes	No	No	
1974	Dead Cert	Yes	Yes	No	
1975	Mahogany	Yes	No	No	Uncredited; replaced by Berry Gordy
1977	Joseph Andrews	Yes	Yes	No	
1982	The Border	Yes	No	No	
1984	The Hotel New Hampshire	Yes	Yes	No	
1994	Blue Sky	Yes	No	No	

=== Television ===
TV movies

Year	Title	Director	Producer
1952	The Sound of Stillness	No	Yes
1954	Parliament of Science	Yes	Yes
1955	It Should Happen to a Dog	Yes	Yes
1955	Mr. Kettle and Mrs. Moon	Yes	No
1955	Othello	Yes	Yes
1956	The Gambler	Yes	Yes
1978	A Death in Canaan	Yes	No
1986	Penalty Phase	Yes	No
1988	Beryl Markham: A Shadow on the Sun	Yes	No

TV series

Year	Title	Director	Producer	Notes
1952	Happy and Glorious	No	Yes	6 episodes
1953	Wednesday Theatre	Yes	Yes	Episodes "Curtain Down" and "Box for One"
1955	You Know What People Are	Yes	Yes	6 episodes
1955	Appointment with Drama	Yes	Yes	Episodes "The Rivals", "The Birthday Present", "Absence of Mind" and "The Apollo of Bellac"
1955	BBC Sunday-Night Theatre	Yes	Yes	Episodes "Markheim", "The Makepeace Story #1: The Ruthless Destiny", "The Makepeace Story #2: A New Generation" and "The Makepeace Story #3: Family Business"
1956	Tales from Soho	No	Yes	6 episodes
1956	ITV Play of the Week	Yes	No	Episode Look Back in Anger
1957	Theatre Night	Yes	No	Episode The Member of the Wedding
1960	BBC Sunday-Night Play	Yes	Yes	Episode A Subject of Scandal and Concern
1990	The Phantom of the Opera	Yes	No	2 episodes

=== Theatre ===
sources: Adler; Little & McLaughlin; Richardson

Year	Play	House	City	Run
1954	The Changeling	Wyndham's	London	1 performance
1955	The Country Wife	Theatre Royal Stratford East	London	3 weeks
1955	Mr Kettle & Mrs Moon	Duchess	London	
1956	The Mulberry Bush	Royal Court	London	
1956	The Crucible	Royal Court	London	
1956	Look Back in Anger	Royal Court	London	151 performances
1956	Cards of Identity	Royal Court	London	
1957	Look Back in Anger	John Golden, Lyceum	New York	1 year
1957	Look Back in Anger		Moscow	
1957	The Member of the Wedding	Royal Court	London	
1957	The Entertainer	Royal Court	London	4 weeks
1957	The Apollo of Bellac	Royal Court	London	
1957	The Chairs	Royal Court	London	
1957	The Entertainer	Palace	London	6 months
1957	The Making of Moo	Royal Court	London	
1957	Requiem for a Nun	Royal Court	London	
1958	The Entertainer	Royale	New York	
1958	The Chairs & The Lesson	Phoenix	New York	17 performances
1958	Flesh to a Tiger	Royal Court	London	
1958	Pericles	Shakespeare Memorial Theatre	Stratford-on-Avon	
1959	Othello	Shakespeare Memorial Theatre	Stratford-on-Avon	
1959	Orpheus Descending	Royal Court	London	
1959	Look After Lulu!	Royal Court	London	45 performances
1959	Look After Lulu!	New	London	5 months
1960	A Taste of Honey		Los Angeles	
1960	A Taste of Honey	Booth, Lyceum	New York	376 performances
1961	The Changeling	Royal Court	London	
1961	Luther	Royal Court	London	28 performances
1961	Luther	Phoenix	London	239 performances
1962	A Midsummer Night's Dream	Royal Court	London	29 performances
1962	Semi-Detached	Saville	London	
1963	Natural Affection	Booth	New York	31 performances
1963	Luther	Lunt-Fontanne, St. James	New York	6 months
1963	Semi-Detached	Music Box	New York	12 performances
1963	Arturo Ui	Lunt-Fontanne	New York	8 performances
1964	The Milk Train Doesn't Stop Here Anymore	Brooks Atkinson	New York	5 performances
1964	The Seagull	Queen's Theatre	London	
1964	St Joan of the Stockyards	Queen's Theatre	London	3 weeks
1969	Hamlet	Roundhouse	London	10 weeks
1969	Hamlet	Lunt-Fontanne	New York	52 performances
1972	The Threepenny Opera	Prince of Wales	London	
1972	I, Claudius	Queen's Theatre	London	
1972	Anthony and Cleopatra	Bankside Globe Playhouse	London	
1976	The Lady from the Sea	Circle in the Square Theatre	New York	
1979	As You Like It	Center Theatre	Long Beach	
1983	Toyer	Kennedy Center	Washington	
1984	Dreamhouse	L.A. Stage Co.	Hollywood	

=== Bibliography ===
- Richardson, Tony (1993). The Long Distance Runner: A Memoir. London: Faber and Faber. ISBN 978-0688121013.
- Heilpern, John (2006). John Osborne: A Patriot for Us. London: Chatto & Windus. ISBN 978-0-7011-6780-6.
- Little, Ruth & McLaughlin, Emily (2007). The Royal Court Theatre Inside Out. Oberon Books. ISBN 978-1-84002-763-1.
- Adler, Tim (2012). The House of Redgrave. London: Aurum. ISBN 978-1-84513-623-9.

== Awards and nominations ==
=== Accolades for Richardson's directed features ===
Year	Feature	Academy Awards		BAFTAs		Golden Globes	
Year	Feature	Nominations	Wins	Nominations	Wins	Nominations	Wins
1959	Look Back in Anger			4		1	
1960	The Entertainer	1		3			
1961	A Taste of Honey			6	4	1	1
1962	The Loneliness of the Long Distance Runner			1	1		
1963	Tom Jones	10	4	6	3	7	2
1966	Mademoiselle			2	1		
1967	The Sailor from Gibraltar			2			
1968	The Charge of the Light Brigade			7			
1973	A Delicate Balance					1	
1977	Joseph Andrews			1		1	
1994	Blue Sky	1	1			1	1
Total		12	5	32	9	12	4

Directed Academy Award Performances
Under Richardson's direction, these actors have received Oscar nominations (and 1 win) for their performances in these respective roles.

Year	Performer	Film	Result
Best Actor Oscar
1961	Laurence Olivier	The Entertainer	Nominated
1964	Albert Finney	Tom Jones	Nominated
Best Actress Oscar
1995	Jessica Lange	Blue Sky	Won
Best Supporting Actor Oscar
1964	Hugh Griffith	Tom Jones	Nominated
Best Supporting Actress Oscar
1964	Diane Cilento	Tom Jones	Nominated
1964	Edith Evans	Tom Jones	Nominated
1964	Joyce Redman	Tom Jones	Nominated

== See also ==
- List of British film directors
- List of Academy Award winners and nominees from Great Britain
- List of oldest and youngest Academy Award winners and nominees — Youngest winners for Best Director
