= Oscar Lewenstein =

British theatre, film producer (1917–1997)

- Born: Silvion Oscar Lewenstein; 18 January 1917; Hackney, London, England
- Died: 23 February 1997 (aged 80); Hove, Sussex, England
- Occupations: Theatre and film producer

Silvion Oscar Lewenstein (18 January 1917 – 23 February 1997) was a British theatre and film producer, who helped create some of the leading British theatre and film productions of the 1950s and 1960s.

== Early life and career ==
Born in Hackney, London, Lewenstein was the son of Russian-Jewish immigrants who had fled antisemitism before the Russian Revolution. He spent most of his childhood in Hove, Sussex. His father's formerly successful plywood business went into a decline during his teens, the family returned to London, and the younger Lewenstein left school.

A former member of the Young Communist League, now active in the Communist Party itself, he became involved in the Unity Theatre movement via his friendship with Ted Willis. After a period working for the Unity Theatre just after the war, he briefly worked at the Embassy Theatre in Swiss Cottage. In 1952 he became artistic director of the Royal Court Theatre, becoming its general manager the following year. Lewenstein co-founded the English Stage Company in 1954 with director George Devine and dramatist Ronald Duncan. During the company's formation, Lewenstein approached Devine and secured him as its first artistic director.

In the West End, Lewenstein produced Bertolt Brecht's The Threepenny Opera in 1956 and Saint Joan of the Stockyards in 1964. He was also responsible for three of Joan Littlewood's Theatre Workshop productions, including the West End transfers of Brendan Behan's The Hostage and Shelagh Delaney's A Taste of Honey.

In 1969, Lewenstein opened The Roundhouse in Camden Town as a theatrical venue for the experimental American collective The Living Theatre.

== Later career ==
Lewenstein was the producer of, among other films, The Knack ...and How to Get It (1965) and Rita, Sue and Bob Too (1987). Earlier, he had been involved in supervising Tom Jones (1963) and other Woodfall films, a company of which he was a director from 1961 to 1967. Lewenstein optioned Joe Orton's screenplay Up Against It after Brian Epstein, the manager of The Beatles, had rejected it as a project for his clients, but the film was never made. The theatre and film director Lindsay Anderson, who thought Lewenstein was "the strangest mixture of foolishness and (sometimes) good intuitions" worked with him on The White Bus (1967), a short film based on one of Shelagh Delaney's short stories.

Following Neville Blond's death in 1970, Lewenstein became joint chairman of the English Stage Company with Robin Fox. He became sole chairman after Fox's death in 1971, and served as the company's artistic director from 1972 to 1975. He was artistic director of the English Stage Company from 1972 to 1975, after two years as chairman. His tenure ended in 1975 after a proposal to move the company from the Royal Court to the Old Vic was rejected. He remained on the company's council until resigning in 1977.

In October 1974, Lewenstein instigated a letter to The Times, signed by 13 other theatre directors, over a perception that the funding of the new National Theatre building (which eventually opened in 1976) would starve the rest of subsided theatre in Britain. Peter Hall, then the National Theatre's artistic director, admitted in his Diaries calling him a "shit and a creep" to his face in a chance encounter at the National Film Theatre. Lewenstein much admired Orton's plays, and while Lewenstein was artistic director of the Royal Court he organised a season of the dramatist's work, which included a successful revival of What the Butler Saw in a production by Lindsay Anderson.

Among the thousands who had left the Communist Party in 1956, Lewenstein remained a socialist for the rest of his life. He married the potter (and later journal editor) Eileen Edith Lewenstein (née Mawson) in 1952, his second wife; the couple had two sons. His wife survived him until 2005. Lewenstein's memoir Kicking Against the Pricks: A Theatre Producer Looks Back was published in 1994 by Nick Hern Books.

Lewenstein died of heart failure, aged 80, at his home in Hove, Sussex.
