= Together (1956 film) =

1956 British film

- Directed by: Lorenza Mazzetti; Denis Horne
- Story by: Denis Horne
- Starring: Michael Andrews; Eduardo Paolozzi; Valy
- Cinematography: Hamid Harari
- Edited by: John Fletcher; Lindsay Anderson (supervising editor)
- Music by: Danièle Paris
- Production companies: Harlequin Productions; BFI Experimental Film Fund
- Distributed by: Connoisseur
- Release date: 1956
- Running time: 52 minutes
- Country: United Kingdom
- Language: English

Together is a 1956 city symphony featurette about two deaf people in the East End of London, directed by Lorenza Mazzetti, in collaboration with Denis Horne, based on his short story, The Glass Marble.

== Production ==
The two main characters are played by artists Eduardo Paolozzi and Michael Andrews, who were friends of the filmmaker. The film, produced by the British Film Institute Experimental Film Fund, was first shown as part of the first Free Cinema programme at the National Film Theatre in London in February 1956, along with Tony Richardson and Karel Reisz's Momma Don't Allow, and Lindsay Anderson's O Dreamland.

== See also ==
- List of avant-garde films of the 1950s
- Kitchen sink realism
