= Penelope Houston (film critic) =

British film critic (1927–2015)

Penelope Houston (9 September 1927 – 26 October 2015) was an English film critic and journal editor. She edited Sight & Sound for almost 35 years.

== Early life ==
Born in Kensington, London, she was the daughter of Duncan McNeill Houston and his wife Eilean (née Marlowe). Her father was a rubber broker, while her maternal grandfather was Thomas Marlowe, an early editor of the Daily Mail. She attended Wimbledon High School, before winning a scholarship to Roedean School, near Brighton; the school was evacuated to the Lake District during the war.

== Career ==
In 1947, she was the first editor of the short-lived film journal Sequence founded by Lindsay Anderson, Karel Reisz and Gavin Lambert at Oxford University, where she read modern history at Somerville College, and graduated from Oxford with a double first in 1949. For a year, she worked in Whitehall on research into the history of the Second World War.

In 1950, she joined Sight & Sound, the journal of the British Film Institute, as Lambert's assistant. During this early period, she was involved around 1952 with initiating the feature for which the magazine remains best known, the critics' decade poll for the 10 best films ever made. Houston did not create the feature, which she described in September 1962 as an "impossible but intriguing game", but she was responsible for its high profile.

Houston became the editor of Sight & Sound, then a quarterly journal, in 1956 after Lambert departed for a career as a Hollywood screenwriter. She remained in the post until 1990. At the same time, she was a regular contributor to the Monthly Film Bulletin for many years until the mid-1970s. (The two magazines merged shortly after Houston retired). In the late 1960s and early 1970s she oversaw publication of the BFI's "Cinema One" book series. She also had a period as a film critic for The Spectator, deputised for The Times critic and for The Observer as C. A. Lejeune's deputy in 1957. She also wrote for The Observer and, occasionally, for The Guardian.

Houston was the author of several books on cinema, including The Contemporary Cinema (1963) and Keepers of the Frame: Film Archives (1994). She also wrote a short book on a film directed by Alberto Cavalcanti, Went the Day Well? (1942).

== Personal life ==
Houston was an amateur player of golf and a follower of horse racing, on which she gambled. She commented in 2001: "I wouldn’t go into film criticism now if you offered me the top job on a plate. It is so boring. Who wants to spend their days looking at special effects movies from Hollywood made for 15-year-olds?"

Her younger brother, Tom, survived her.
