= Alford House =

Youth club in Kennington, London, England

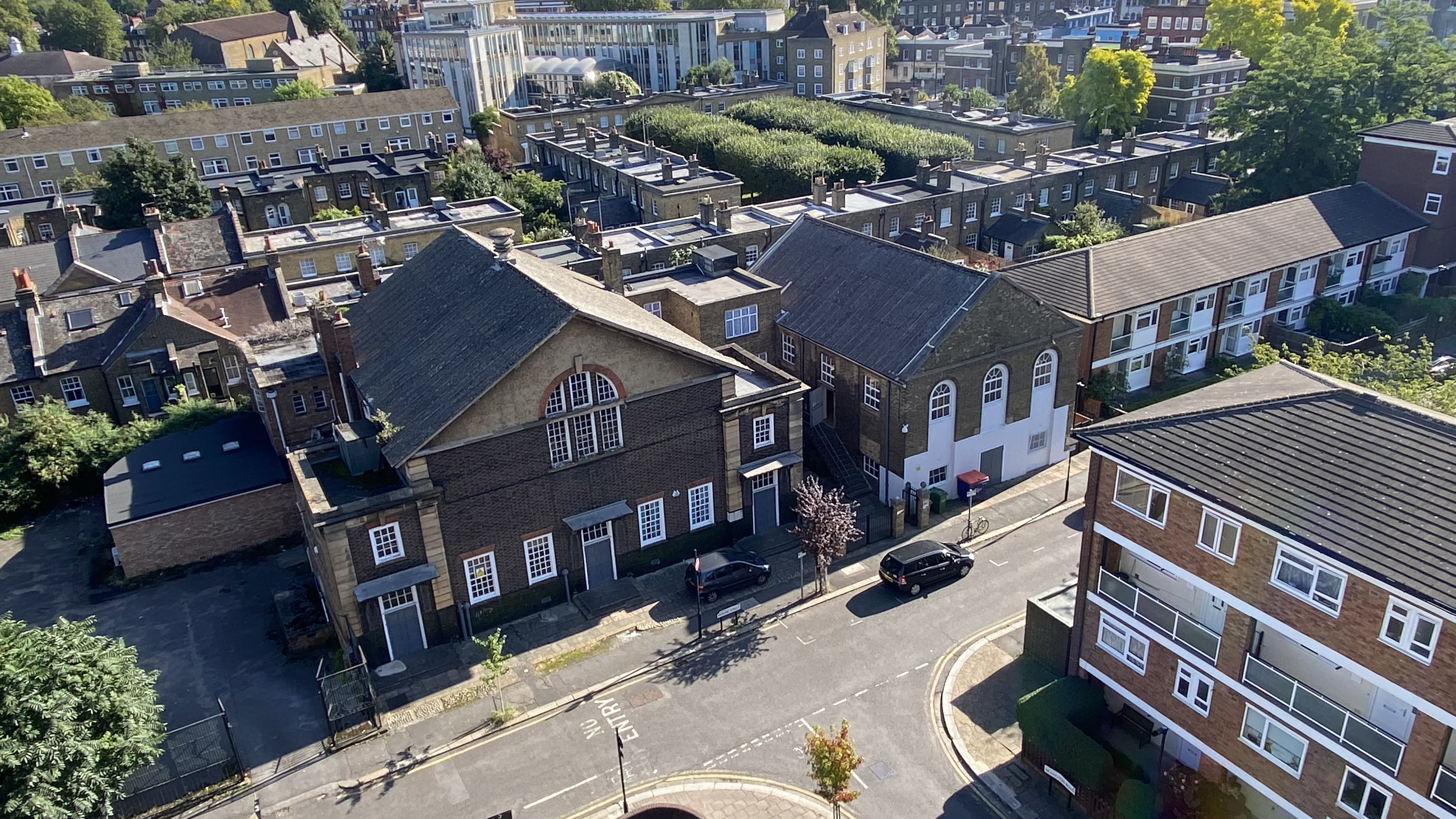
The youth club

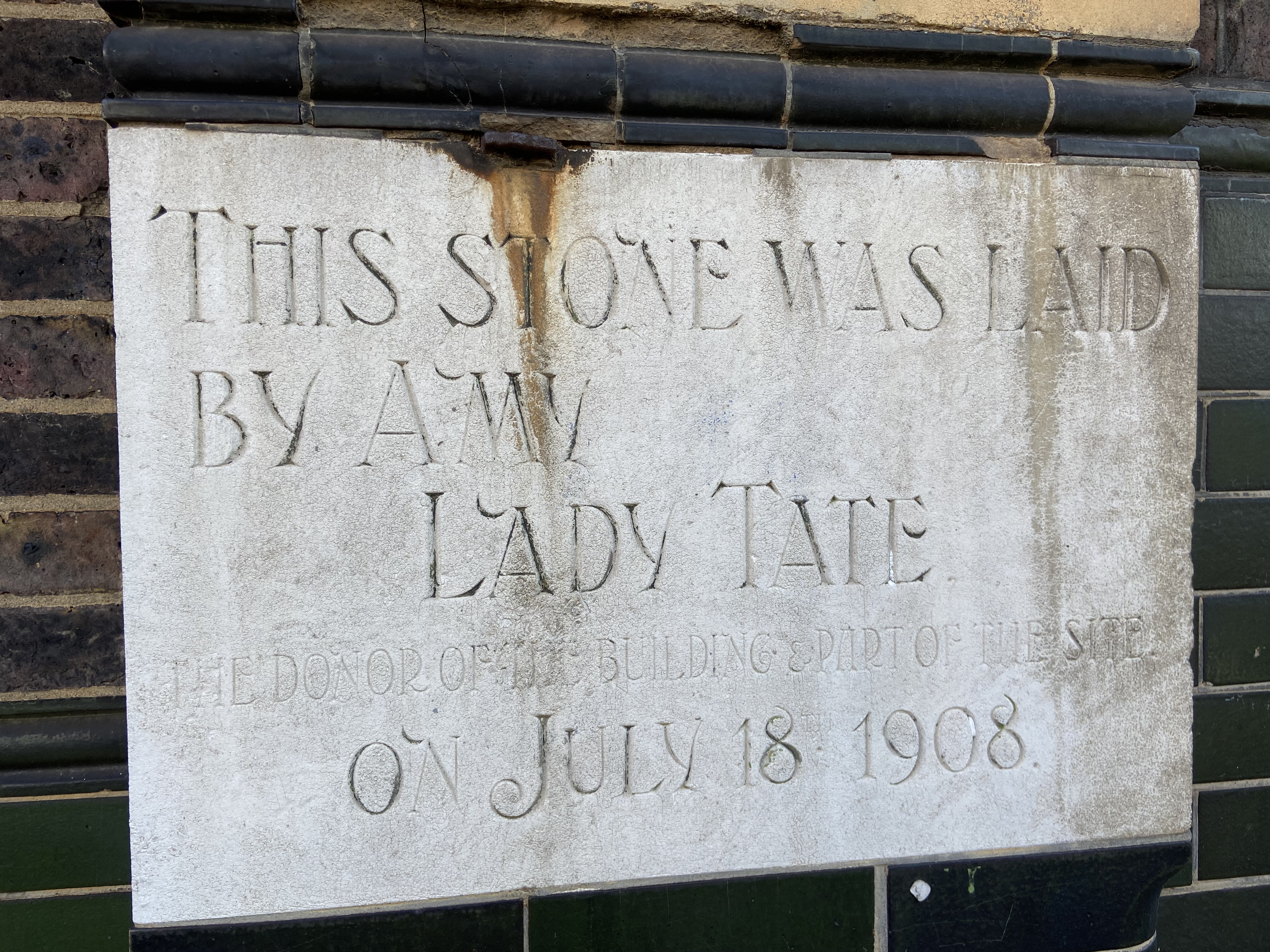
1908 Foundation stone

Alford House is a youth club in Aveline Road, Kennington in the London Borough of Lambeth. It was the subject of Karel Reisz's 1959 documentary We Are the Lambeth Boys and two sequels.

The club was established by Frank Briant in 1884 at premises in Lambeth Walk, which was once one of the most vibrant shopping districts in South London though grindingly poor and described in many literary works such as George Gissings's Thryza from 1887 or W. Somerset Maugham's Liza of Lambeth from 1897.

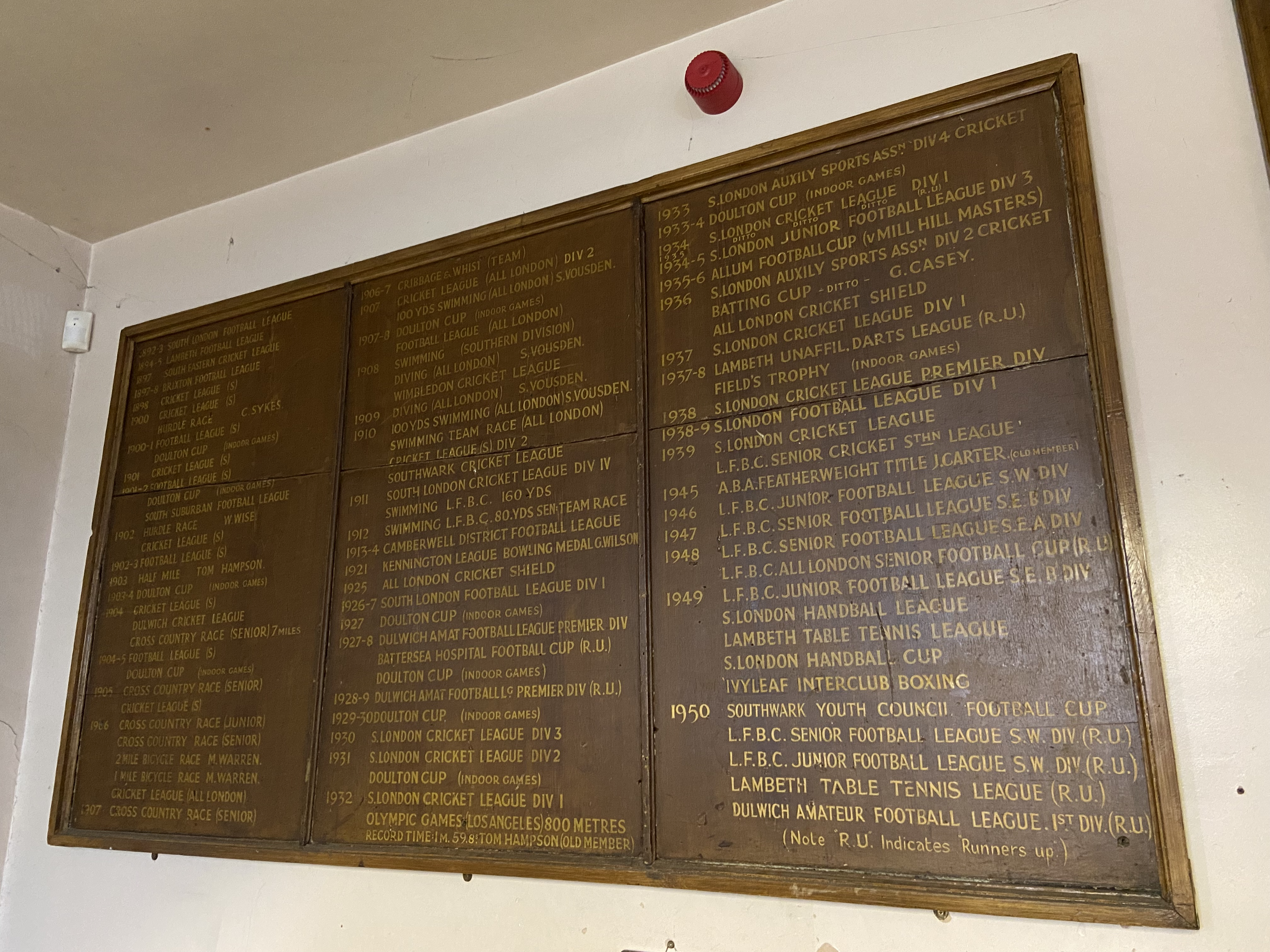
One of the honours boards

In its 2021 publication Alford 70, the authors describe the evolution of the club through two world wars and its association with Mill Hill public school since 1934.

The club moved from Lambeth Walk after the Second World War into buildings that had suffered extensive bomb damage and were formerly the Moffat Institute. They were given to the club by the London Congregational Union in 1949. They were repaired and converted to their present use and occupied by the Club in 1950. The club building is locally listed.
