= Lorenza Mazzetti =

Italian film director (1927–2020)

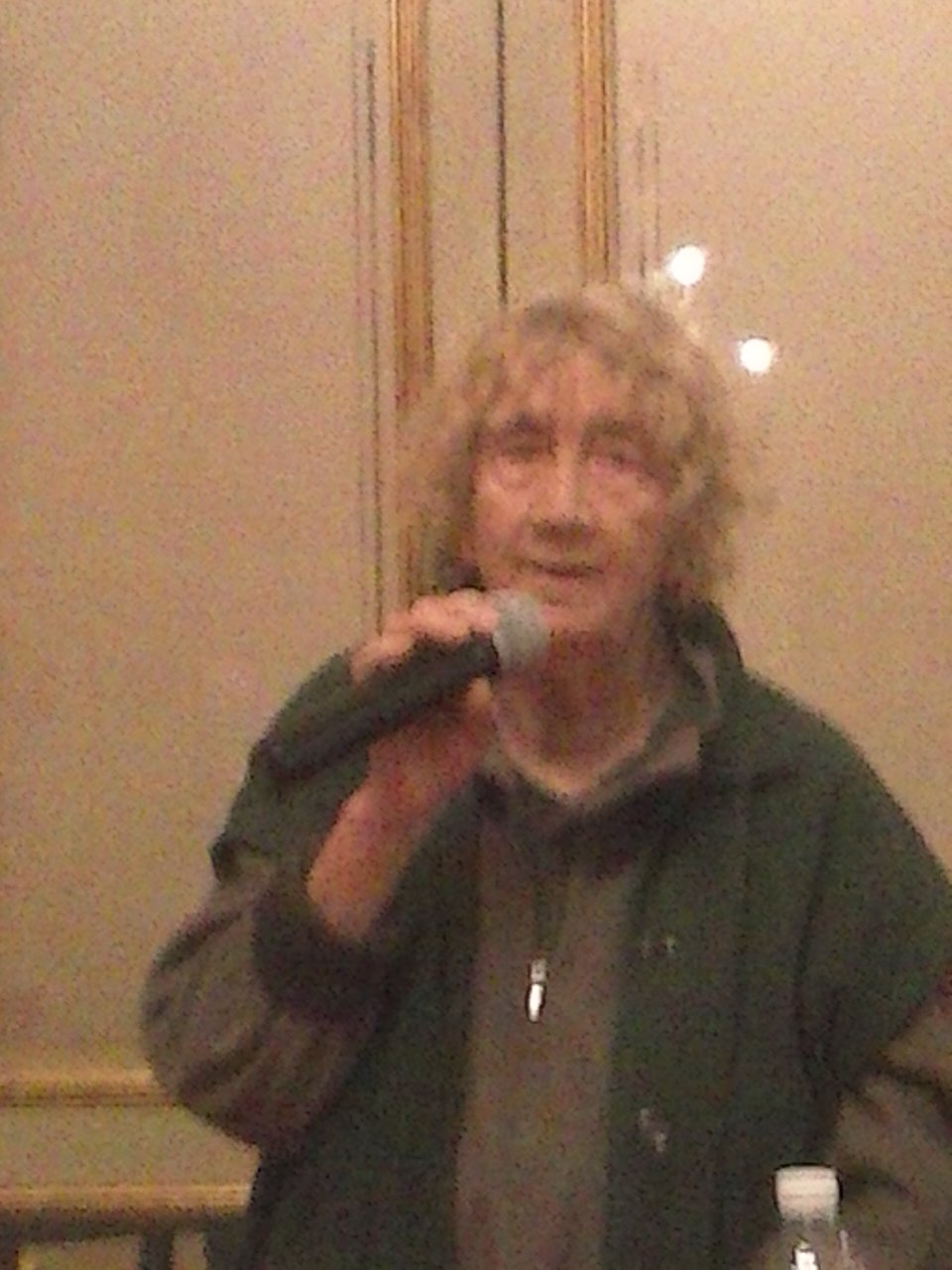
- Lorenza Mazzetti in Perugia, 2014
- Born: 26 July 1927; Florence, Tuscany, Italy
- Died: 4 January 2020 (aged 92); Rome, Lazio, Italy
- Occupations: Film director, novelist, photographer, painter

Lorenza Mazzetti (26 July 1927 – 4 January 2020) was an Italian film director, novelist, photographer and painter. She was connected to Albert Einstein through her aunt's marriage to Einstein's cousin, and survived a massacre of her family by German soldiers in August, 1944.

== Early life ==
Mazzetti was born in Florence. Her mother, Olga Liberati, died shortly after giving birth to Lorenza and her twin sister Paola. Her father, Corrado Mazzetti, gave custody of his children to a nurse in the village Anticoli Corrado, where they spent the first three years of their lives. When Corrado Mazzetti realised that the nurse was taking advantage of his absence and leaving the children alone while he was out at work, his friend Ugo Giannattasio, a futurist painter, offered to temporarily take care of them.

Mazzetti and her sister eventually moved in with their paternal aunt, Cesarina (Nina) Mazzetti, on a farm in Rignano sull’Arno, where she lived with her husband Robert Einstein (cousin of Albert) and their two daughters Anna Maria and Luce. Here Lorenza and Paola became part of the family and lived happy and untroubled.

During the Second World War, the farm was occupied by a department of the Wehrmacht. With the advancement of Anglo-American forces, after the last motor truck had just left, three German officers stepped into the villa and asked for Robert. Nina answered that he was not at home. The officers announced that they would return shortly. Assuming that the only person in danger would be her husband, Nina begged him to hide in the woods. However, when the officers returned on 3 August 1944 and did not find Robert, they assassinated his family. This incident is known as the Strage di Rignano. Lorenza and Paola were able to escape the massacre because their surname wasn't Einstein. However, their lives had become tainted forever by the execution of their aunt and their cousins. After the carnage, they were carried away, along with a group of farmers who had been hiding in the basement seeking shelter from the bombing of the British armed forces. The farm was set on fire. Robert, who had hidden in the woods, was overwhelmed by pain and committed suicide on 13 July 1945. Lorenza and Paola were entrusted to a custodian that their uncle had authorised with the administration of his estate that he had passed on to them.

== Life in London in the 1950s, films K and Together ==
After obtaining her high school diploma, and determined to bury the terrible memory in her subconscious, Lorenza moved to London. There she received a message from her sister Paola that their custodian had squandered their whole wealth and had left the sisters penniless. In order to be able to stay in London, Lorenza took a job as a waitress in an eatery at Charing Cross. She could not afford to pay her rent, but thanks to the sympathy of the director William Coldstream, who was impressed by her tenacity, she was accepted into the Slade School of Fine Art.

Between 1952 and 1953, Mazzetti worked on her first film, K. The (unacknowledged) participation in the early stages by fellow Slade student Andrew Vicari has been described by a then-friend of both. The topic of the film deals with the story of Franz Kafka's Metamorphosis and is interpreted by the painter Michael Andrews. The film is considered to have anticipated the future Free Cinema, which in 1956 would be written down and signed by Mazzetti, Lindsay Anderson, Tony Richardson and Karel Reisz.

K is a strongly biographically stamped story dealing with the theme of alienation. The soundtrack was produced by Daniele Paris, who also worked with Mazzetti and Anderson in their later projects. To develop the film reels and obtain a copy of her film, Lorenza was prepared to make a false statement and risk prison time. Fortunately, she was saved by Coldstream, who was convinced by her talent and organised a showing of the film at the Slade School. He invited Denis Forman, the director of the British Film Institute. At the end of the performance, Forman asked Mazzetti: ‘Would you like to make a film without running the risk of going to prison?’ He invited her to partake in a new film project, which was to be financed by the BFI Experimental Film Fund. The result was the film Together.

Together features the sculptor Eduardo Paolozzi and Michael Andrews as two deaf-mutes in the East End of London and was produced by the same film crew as K. Together was also written by Denis Horne, but he left the production because of a disagreement with the director, who did not want to incorporate his long dialogues in the recording. The montage works, guided by Mazzetti, were finished thanks to an intervention by Anderson. He called on Daniele Paris from Rome to write and direct the soundtrack. Together won the "Mention au film de recherche" on the Festival di Cannes 1956, along with the Brassaï film Tant qu'il y aura des bêtes.

In her book Diario Londinese, published by Sellerio in 2014, Mazzetti described the audacious adventures of this time. This was published in English as London Diaries in 2019.

== Return to Italy and success of Il cielo cade (The Sky Falls) ==
After leaving London in order to collect her film prize in Cannes, Mazzetti returned to Italy for a while. She wished to see her twin sister, who in the meantime had given birth to a daughter. However back in Italy she became haunted by the tragic murder of her adopted family and fell into a deep depression, leading her to stay longer than originally planned. After a long phase of treatment, and thanks to the psychotherapist Barrie Simmons, she managed to excavate the suppressed and reclaim parts of the tender, magical memories of her childhood—even if accompanied by a lot of pain. This is how she began to work on her book Il cielo cade.

The manuscript was rejected by several editors until Mazzetti sent it to Cesare Zavattini. He reacted with enthusiasm and presented it to Attilio Bertolucci, publisher of Garzanti. Bertolucci declared the book a little masterpiece: he published and sent the work to the Premio Viareggio, where in 1962 Il cielo cade won first prize.

Il cielo cade is written in a narrative style of a child and from a child's perspective with the war described from the viewpoint of a child, who is in love with Gesu’, the Duce and its adoptive uncle. It is a tragic but also a comical book. Worried that the tone of her story could offend the memory of the Einstein family, Mazzetti changed the names of the protagonists. Federico Fellini compared the novel with Il giornalino di Gian Burrasca, while Henri Michaux calls it "un petit livre féroce".

When Garzanti's rights to the text expired, Il cielo cade was republished by Elvira Sellerio. Mazzetti confessed to the publisher that rather than a novel, the book was more her own biography. As a result of this, Elvira Sellerio asked her to dedicate the book to the Einstein family and add a photo of Nina and Robert Einstein. The novel, now published by Sellerio, is considered a classic of contemporary Italian literature. In 2000, Il cielo cade was filmed under the same title by brothers Andrea Frazzi and Antonio Frazzi. It was staged by Suso Cecchi D’Amico and acted out by Isabella Rossellini. In the same year, the film won the prize for the best film of the Giffoni Film Festival.

The following novel Con rabbia (Rage) was published in 1963 by Garzanti: "Penny hates not only the Germans, who have murdered her family but all hypocritical philistines, who make themselves guilty each day again".

== Life in Rome, Puppet Theatre and other publications ==
In the Sixties Lorenza met Bruno Grieco, a journalist, writer and son of Ruggero Grieco, who—together with Bordiga, Gramsci and Terracini—founded the Partito Comunista Italiano. Grieco was prompted by Cesare Zavattini to accompany Lorenza to the international exhibition of the "Cinema libero di Porretta Terme". Together with Giampaolo Testa and Leonida Repaci, the creatives were determined to win the prize for the best film there. Lorenza and Grieco began what was to be a long relationship. Their shared apartment on Via Vittoria, Rome, was frequented by many artists and intellectuals. Besides the protagonists of the Free Cinema (Lindsay Anderson, Reisz, Richardson, Richard Harris and Tom Courtenay), there were also Daisy Lumini, Marguerite Duras, Max Frisch, Malcolm McDowell, Rod Steiger and Claire Bloom, Guillaume Chpaltine, Serge Reggiani, Agnès Varda, Anouk Aimée, Achille Perilli, Piero Dorazio, Renzo Vespignani, Francesco Trombadori and, amongst others, Gian Maria Volonté, who played endless ping-pong matches with Giovanni Berlinguer.

When Cesare Zavattini commissioned a team of young directors to produce the episode film Le italiane e l’amore (1961), he entrusted Lorenza Mazzetti with an episode that dealt with children. She accepted, but after the shooting decided to leave the film world because the "cinema verita’" did not interest her.

Thanks to her prizes and the public recognition that Lorenza Mazzetti had gained in the meantime, she was offered a collaboration with the magazine Vie Nuove (where Pier Paolo Pasolini was also writing at the time) by the Partito Comunista. Lorenza wrote a weekly column for the magazine, in which she invited the reader to tell her their dreams. She then interpreted these dreams together with Jungian psychoanalyst Vincenzo Loriga. Through this, the concept of the subconscious was introduced to the world of the workers for the first time. Unfortunately, this venture was judged as too risky by the communist party—meaning that Lorenza had to renounce any hope of working with Italian broadcasting station Rai, even though a minor collaboration had already started there.

The articles of Lorenza Mazzetti in Vie Nuove are collected in the volume "Il lato oscuro. L’inconscio degli italiani", published by Tindalo in 1969.

In the same year her novel "Uccidi il padre e la madre" (Kill Your Mother and Father) was released. It is an existentialist novel, telling the story of a young revolutionary woman who does not succeed in getting out of a station that she entered in order to depart from there.

Later, in the surroundings of the Campo de' Fiori, Lorenza started the "Puppet Theatre", a marionette theatre for children. This brought famous English marionettes Pulcinella and his wife Punch e Judy to Rome. In 1974 Lorenza met Luigi Galletti, a partisan of the Gruppi di Azione Patriottica of Giovanni Pesce. He was dressed up as the marshall Harold Alexander. The pair later married. He was a fascinating and humorous man and an esteemed doctor. Lorenza pulled him into the work of the puppet theatre, where he performed the voices of the king, the giant and the wolf.

At the same time, Mazzetti dedicated herself to interpreting children's dreams and to putting them on stage in schools. The experiment was financed by Franco Enriquez, the director of the "Teatro di Roma". The results of the laboratories were published by Guaraldi in the volume of the year 1975 "Il teatro dell’io: l’onirodramma. I bambini drammatizzano a scuola i loro sogni".

== Paintings, restoration of K and its distribution ==
Later in her life, Mazzetti developed a career as a painter, which culminated in two exhibitions: "The Album di famiglia" with 80 paintings illustrating the events described in the novel Il Cielo cade: and "A proposito del Free Cinema" where she created portraits of key figures of English cinema during the 50s and 60s. The exhibition was shown in several cities: in Rome, in the Complesso San Michele, the seat of the "Beni Culturali", where it was visited over three months by schoolchildren; in Florence, in the Palazzo Medici; in Porretta Terme (BO), and in Mantova and in Dresden, where it was organised by the Italian Consulate together with the Jewish Community and the University Dresden.

K, which had been jealously guarded by its author, was reconstructed only in 2010 by the Associazione Cinit Cineforum Italiano. Thanks to Marco Duse and Marco Vanelli, the film was transferred to DVD and attached to issue 168 of the magazine Cabiria Studi di cinema. It has been shown in London, Venice, Florence, Bologna and Rome.

In a certain way, all the books of Mazzetti can be seen as a continuation of Il cielo cade. Furthermore, Diario Londinese is a kind of prequel in which Mazzetti describes the beginnings of the Free Cinema and also the Angry Young Men. The stream of consciousness is a suppression of the past that caused all of Mazzetti's undertakings, and probably also the cause of all her successes. Diario Londinese was presented for the first time in Rome by the "Casa del Cinema di Roma", by Irene Bignardi and Antonio Gnoli.

It was Mazzetti's main objective to show the film Il cielo cade in schools. She wanted to talk with young people in order to keep the memory of the Holocaust alive, by the example of the tragedy of the Einstein family, a massacre that would have been kept a secret if not for her book.

On 4 January 2020, Mazzetti died in Rome at age 92.

== In popular culture ==
Mazzetti appears as a minor but significant character in the 2020 novel Summer by Ali Smith; her life story, as well as references to her early films, are included. The 2020 British film Adrift in Soho, directed by Pablo Behrens, includes a character, named Jo, who was inspired by Mazzetti.

== Filmography ==
- K (1954), starring Michael Andrews
- Together (1956), starring Michael Andrews, Eduardo Paolozzi
- I cattivi vanno in Paradiso (1959)
- Latin Lovers (1961)
- Mysteries of Rome (1966)

== Books ==
- Il cielo cade (1962). The Sky Falls, trans. Marguerite Waldman (1962); The Sky is Falling, trans. Livia Franchini (2022)
- Con rabbia (1963). Rage, trans. Isabel Quigly (Bodley Head, 1965)
- Uccidi il padre e la madre (1969)
- Il lato oscuro, Tindalo (1969)
- Il teatro dell'io: l'onirodramma. I bambini drammatizzano a scuola i loro sogni (1975)
- Diario londinese (2014). London Diaries, trans. Melinda Mele (Zidane Press, 2018)
