= The Saturday Men =

The Saturday Men is a 1962 British sports documentary about association football that follows a week in the life of West Bromwich Albion football club. The film, the third episode of the three-part television series Look at Britain, was narrated by Barney Bamford and Don Howe. It shows team members training and being given a pre-match talk by the club's manager, Archie Macaulay, as well as footage of boardroom meetings. There is also an interview with a footballer who is about to begin a new career as a salesman, and an appearance by a young Bobby Robson. The episode was directed by John Fletcher and written by Denis Mitchell, and was part of a series that looked at working class British life. The other two films in the series are Every Day Except Christmas and We Are the Lambeth Boys.

In July 2015, the film was included in the British Film Institute's online project, Britain on Film, which aims to build a social history of everyday British life.
