= Sight and Sound =

British film magazine

- Editor: Mike Williams
- Categories: Film
- Frequency: Monthly
- Publisher: British Film Institute
- Founded: 1932; 94 years ago
- Country: United Kingdom
- Based in: London
- Language: English
- Website: www.bfi.org.uk/sight-and-sound
- ISSN: 0037-4806 (print); 2515-5164 (web)

Sight and Sound (formerly written Sight & Sound) is a monthly film magazine published by the British Film Institute (BFI). Since 1952, it has conducted the well-known decennial Sight and Sound poll of the greatest films of all time.

== History and content ==
Sight and Sound was first published in Spring 1932 as "A quarterly review of modern aids to learning published under the auspices of the British Institute of Adult Education" following meetings by the Commission on Educational and Cultural Films. In 1934, management of the magazine was handed to the nascent British Film Institute (BFI), which still publishes the magazine today.Sight and Sound was published quarterly for most of its history until the early 1990s, apart from a brief run as a monthly publication in the early 1950s, but in 1991 it merged with another BFI publication, the Monthly Film Bulletin, and started to appear monthly. Currently the publication appears 10 times a year, every month except for its January/February and July/August combined issues.

In 1949, Gavin Lambert, co-founder of film journal Sequence, was hired as the editor by BFI director Denis Forman, and brought with him Sequence editor Penelope Houston as assistant editor as well as co-founders and future film directors Lindsay Anderson and Karel Reisz. Lambert edited the journal until 1956, with Houston taking over as editor until 1990. Philip Dodd became the editor following the merging of Monthly Film Bulletin with Nick James taking over in 1997. James was editor until August 2019. It is currently edited by Mike Williams. The magazine reviews all film releases each month, including those with a limited (art house) release, as opposed to most film magazines which concentrate on those films with a general release.

Sight and Sound has in the past been the subject of criticism, notably from Raymond Durgnat, who often accused it of elitism, puritanism and snobbery, although he did write for it in the 1950s, and again in the 1990s. Until 2020, the magazine's American counterpart was Film Comment, a magazine that was published by the Film Society of Lincoln Center in New York City.

== The Sight and Sound Poll of the Greatest Films of All Time ==
Since 1952, Sight and Sound has conducted a decennial poll to determine the greatest films of all time. Until 1992, the votes of the invited critics and directors were compiled in one list; since 1992, directors have been invited to participate in a separate poll.

The Sight and Sound poll has come to be regarded as the most important of the "greatest ever film" lists. The critic Roger Ebert described it as "by far the most respected of the countless polls of great movies—the only one most serious movie people take seriously."

Sight and Sound first ran the poll in 1952 following publication earlier in the year of a list of the Top Ten Films, headed by Battleship Potemkin, based on a poll of mostly directors conducted by the committee of the Festival Mondial du Film et des Beaux-Arts de Belgique. Following publication of that poll, Sight and Sound decided to poll film critics for their choices and announced the results in their next issue. 85 critics from Britain, France, the United States, Italy, Germany, Denmark, Sweden, Belgium, Czechoslovakia and Yugoslavia were asked but only 63 responded including Lindsay Anderson, Lotte H. Eisner, Curtis Harrington, Henri Langlois, Friedrich Luft, Claude Mauriac, Dilys Powell, Jean Queval, Terry Ramsaye, Karel Reisz, G. W. Stonier (under the name William Whitebait) and Archer Winsten. Most critics found the question unfair. The first poll was topped by Bicycle Thieves with 25 out of 63 votes and contained six silent films. The five subsequent polls (1962–2002) were won by Citizen Kane (which finished 13th in 1952).

For the 2012 poll, Sight and Sound listened to decades of criticism about the lack of diversity of its poll participants and made a huge effort to invite a much wider variety of critics and filmmakers from around the world to participate, taking into account gender, ethnicity, race, geographical region, socioeconomic status, and other kinds of underrepresentation. The list of people polled for the critics' poll expanded significantly from 145 to 846 and also included programmers, curators, archivists, film historians and other academics for the first time. Following the change, Citizen Kane only received the second highest number of votes, with Vertigo receiving the most. The directors' poll also expanded from 108 to 358 directors and Tokyo Story received the most votes with Citizen Kane receiving the joint second-most together with 2001: A Space Odyssey.

In 2022, the number of people polled for the critics' poll increased even further from 846 to 1,639 and Jeanne Dielman, 23 quai du Commerce, 1080 Bruxelles received the most votes, the first film to be directed by a woman to top the list. Vertigo received the second most and Citizen Kane third. Nearly 4,000 different films received at least one mention. 2001: A Space Odyssey topped the directors' poll for the first time in 2022 with Citizen Kane in second place and Tokyo Story in joint fourth together with Jeanne Dielman. Among the directors that participated were Julie Dash, Barry Jenkins, Lynne Ramsay, Martin Scorsese and Apichatpong Weerasethakul.

La Règle du Jeu (The Rules of the Game) appeared in the first seven of the magazine's decennial polls; Citizen Kane has appeared in the last seven.

=== Critics' Top Ten Poll ===
==== 1952 ====
1. Bicycle Thieves (25 mentions)
2. City Lights and The Gold Rush (19 mentions)
4. Battleship Potemkin (16 mentions)
5. Intolerance and Louisiana Story (12 mentions)
7. Greed, The Passion of Joan of Arc and Le Jour Se Lève (11 mentions)
10. Le Million, The Rules of the Game and Brief Encounter (10 mentions)

Closest runners-up: Citizen Kane, La Grande Illusion, and The Grapes of Wrath. (9 mentions apiece)

==== 1962 ====
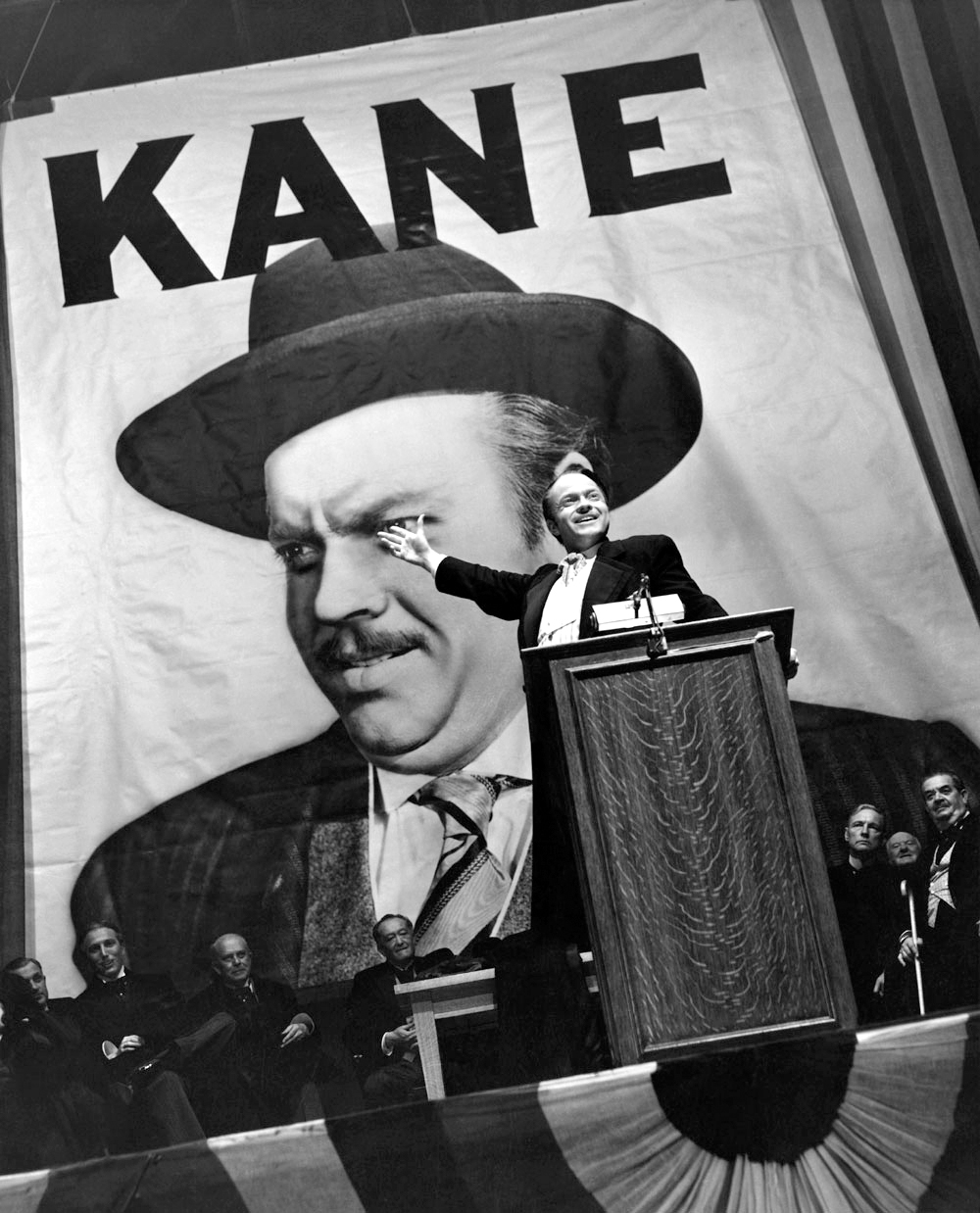
Citizen Kane (1941)

1. Citizen Kane (22 mentions)
2. L'Avventura (20 mentions)
3. The Rules of the Game (19 mentions)
4. Greed and Ugetsu (17 mentions)
6. Battleship Potemkin, Ivan the Terrible and Bicycle Thieves (16 mentions)
9. La Terra Trema (14 mentions)
10. L'Atalante (13 mentions)

Closest runners-up: Hiroshima mon amour, Pather Panchali and Zero for Conduct. (11 mentions apiece)

The number of silent films on the list dropped from six to two. Films directed by Sergei Eisenstein received the most votes with 46, followed by Charles Chaplin with 43 and Jean Renoir with 35.

==== 1972 ====
1. Citizen Kane (32 mentions)
2. The Rules of the Game (28 mentions)
3. Battleship Potemkin (16 mentions)
4. 8½ (15 mentions)
5. L'Avventura and Persona (12 mentions)
7. The Passion of Joan of Arc (11 mentions)
8. The General and The Magnificent Ambersons (10 mentions)
10. Ugetsu and Wild Strawberries (9 mentions)

Closest runners-up: The Gold Rush, Hiroshima mon amour, Ikiru, Ivan the Terrible, Pierrot le Fou, and Vertigo. (8 mentions apiece)

Films directed by Orson Welles received the most votes with 46 votes followed by Jean Renoir with 41 and Ingmar Bergman with 37.

==== 1982 ====
1. Citizen Kane (45 mentions)
2. The Rules of the Game (31 mentions)
3. Seven Samurai and Singin' in the Rain (15 mentions)
5. 8½ (14 mentions)
6. Battleship Potemkin (13 mentions)
7. L'Avventura, The Magnificent Ambersons, and Vertigo (12 mentions)
10. The General and The Searchers (11 mentions)

Closest runners-up: 2001: A Space Odyssey and Andrei Rublev. (10 mentions apiece)

==== 1992 ====
1. Citizen Kane (43 mentions)
2. The Rules of the Game (32 mentions)
3. Tokyo Story (22 mentions)
4. Vertigo (18 mentions)
5. The Searchers (17 mentions)
6. Battleship Potemkin, The Passion of Joan of Arc, L'Atalante and Pather Panchali (15 mentions)
10. 2001: A Space Odyssey (14 mentions)

Closest runners-up: Bicycle Thieves and Singin' in the Rain. (10 mentions apiece)

==== 2002 ====
1. Citizen Kane (46 mentions)
2. Vertigo (41 mentions)
3. The Rules of the Game (30 mentions)
4. The Godfather and The Godfather Part II (23 mentions)
5. Tokyo Story (22 mentions)
6. 2001: A Space Odyssey (21 mentions)
7. Battleship Potemkin and Sunrise: A Song of Two Humans (19 mentions)
9. 8½ (18 mentions)
10. Singin' in the Rain (17 mentions)

Closest runners-up: Seven Samurai and The Searchers. (15 mentions apiece)

==== 2012 ====
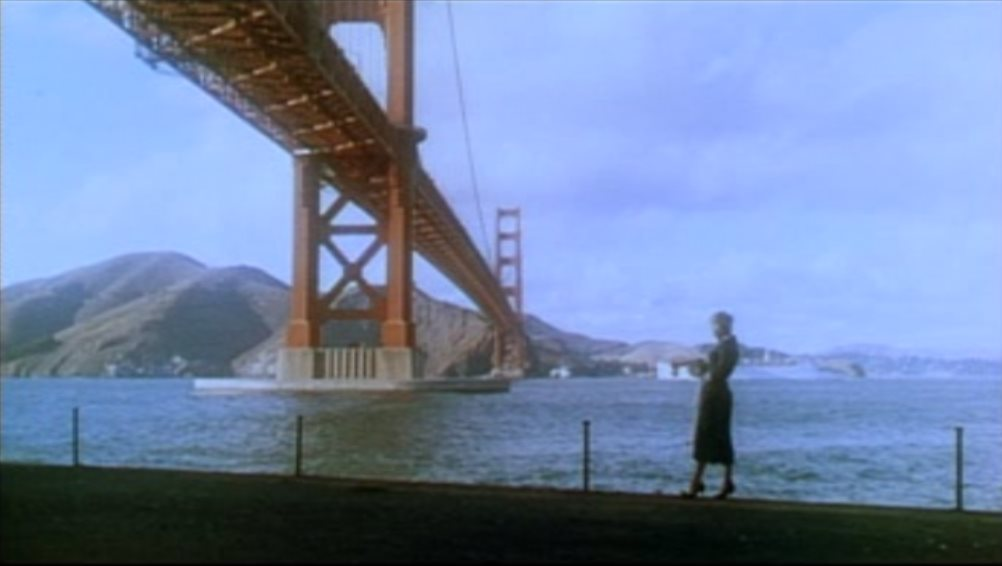
Vertigo (1958), the #1 film according to Sight & Sound in 2012

A new rule was imposed for this ballot: related films that are considered part of a larger whole (e.g. The Godfather and The Godfather Part II, Krzysztof Kieślowski's Three Colors trilogy and Dekalog, or Satyajit Ray's The Apu Trilogy) were to be treated as separate films for voting purposes.

1. Vertigo (191 mentions)
2. Citizen Kane (157 mentions)
3. Tokyo Story (107 mentions)
4. The Rules of the Game (100 mentions)
5. Sunrise: A Song of Two Humans (93 mentions)
6. 2001: A Space Odyssey (90 mentions)
7. The Searchers (78 mentions)
8. Man with a Movie Camera (68 mentions)
9. The Passion of Joan of Arc (65 mentions)
10. 8½ (64 mentions)

Closest runner-up: Battleship Potemkin. (63 mentions)

==== 2022 ====
The participants in this poll nearly doubled to 1,639. Chantal Akerman became the first woman director to top the poll with her 1975 film Jeanne Dielman, 23 quai du Commerce, 1080 Bruxelles. The poll reflected greater diversity than previously, with films by black filmmakers increasing from one in 2012 to seven in 2022, and from two to eleven, by female filmmakers.

Stanley Kubrick's 2001: A Space Odyssey topped the directors' poll, in which 480 directors took part.

1. Jeanne Dielman, 23 quai du Commerce, 1080 Bruxelles (215 votes)
2. Vertigo (208 votes)
3. Citizen Kane (163 votes)
4. Tokyo Story (144 votes)
5. In the Mood for Love (141 votes)
6. 2001: A Space Odyssey (130 votes)
7. Beau Travail (106 votes)
8. Mulholland Drive (105 votes)
9. Man with a Movie Camera (100 votes)
10. Singin' in the Rain (99 votes)

Closest runner-up: Sunrise: A Song of Two Humans

=== Directors' Top Ten Poll ===
==== 1992 ====
1. Citizen Kane (30 votes)
2. 8½, Raging Bull (16 votes)
4. La Strada (12)
5. L'Atalante (11)
6. The Godfather, Modern Times, Vertigo (10 votes)
9. The Godfather Part II, The Passion of Joan of Arc, Rashomon, Seven Samurai (9 votes)

==== 2002 ====
1. Citizen Kane (42 mentions)
2. The Godfather and The Godfather Part II (28 mentions)
3. 8½ (19 mentions)
4. Lawrence of Arabia (16 mentions)
5. Dr. Strangelove (14 mentions)
6. Bicycle Thieves, Raging Bull, Vertigo (13 mentions)
9. Rashomon, The Rules of the Game, Seven Samurai (12 mentions)

==== 2012 ====
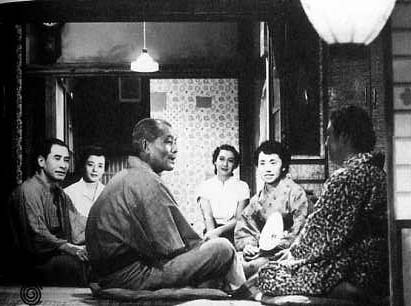
Tokyo Story (1953)

1. Tokyo Story (48 mentions)
2. 2001: A Space Odyssey (42 mentions)
2. Citizen Kane (42 mentions)
4. 8½ (40 mentions)
5. Taxi Driver (34 mentions)
6. Apocalypse Now (33 mentions)
7. The Godfather, Vertigo (31 mentions)
9. Mirror (30 mentions)
10. Bicycle Thieves (29 mentions)

==== 2022 ====
1. 2001: A Space Odyssey
2. Citizen Kane
3. The Godfather
4. Tokyo Story; Jeanne Dielman, 23 quai du Commerce, 1080 Bruxelles
6. Vertigo, 8½
8. Mirror
9. Persona, In the Mood for Love, Close-Up

== The Greatest Directors of All Time ==
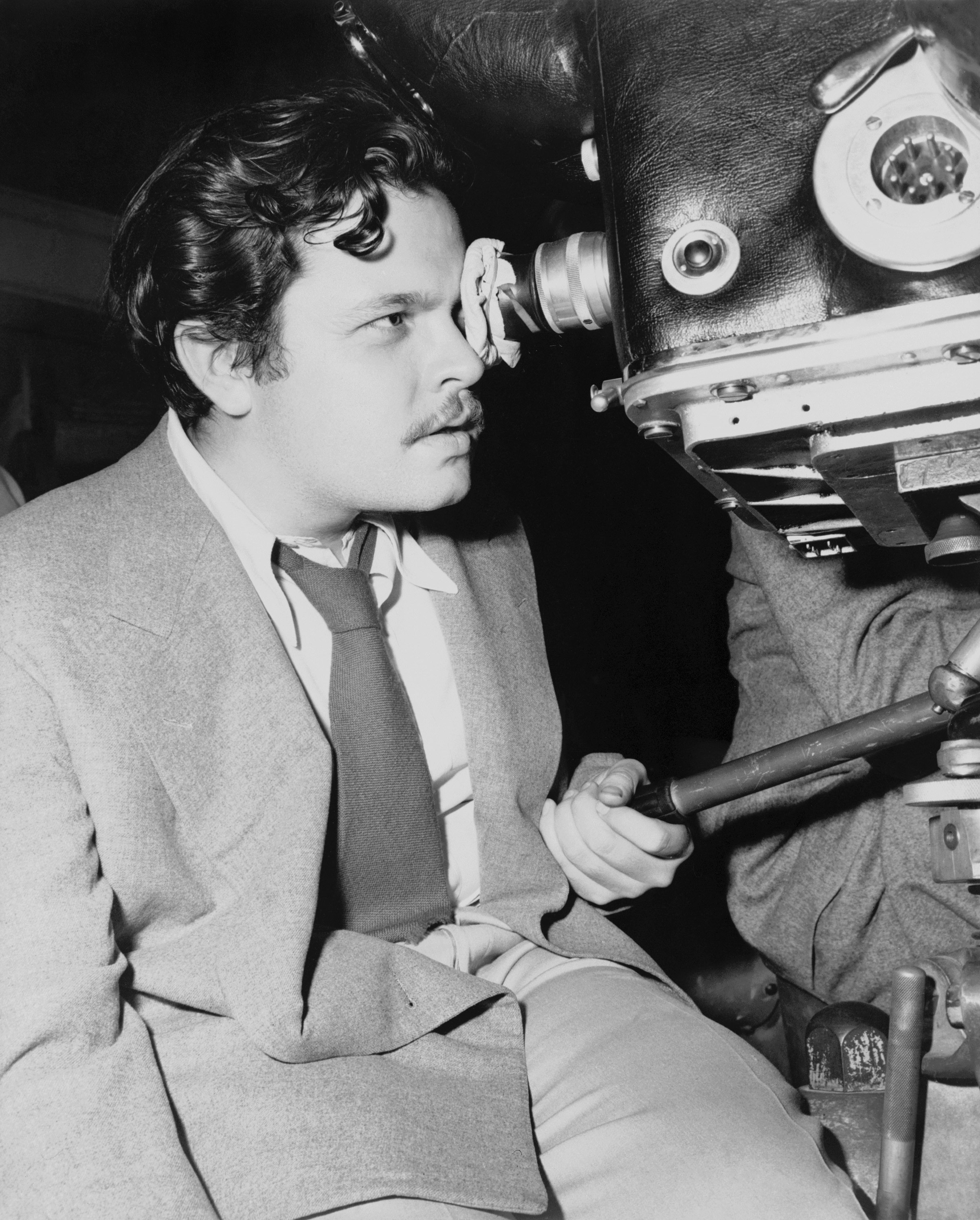
Orson Welles was selected as the greatest film director of all time by both critics and filmmakers.

This list was put together by assembling the directors of the individual films that the critics and the directors polled voted for. 2002 was the only year Sight & Sound compiled the list.

=== Critics' Top Ten Poll ===
==== 2002 ====
1. Orson Welles
2. Alfred Hitchcock
3. Jean-Luc Godard
4. Jean Renoir
5. Stanley Kubrick
6. Akira Kurosawa
7. Federico Fellini
8. John Ford
9. Sergei Eisenstein
10. Francis Ford Coppola
10. Yasujiro Ozu

=== Directors' Top Ten Poll ===
==== 2002 ====
1. Orson Welles
2. Federico Fellini
3. Akira Kurosawa
4. Francis Ford Coppola
5. Alfred Hitchcock
6. Stanley Kubrick
7. Billy Wilder
8. Ingmar Bergman
9. David Lean
9. Jean Renoir
9. Martin Scorsese

== Greatest Documentaries of All Time ==
=== 2014 ===
1. Man with a Movie Camera (100 votes)
2. Shoah (68 votes)
3. Sans Soleil (62 votes)
4. Night and Fog (56 votes)
5. The Thin Blue Line (49 votes)
6. Chronique d'un été (32 votes)
7. Nanook of the North (31 votes)
8. The Gleaners and I (27 votes)
9. Dont Look Back (25 votes)
9. Grey Gardens (25 mentions)

== Greatest film books ==
In 2010, Sight and Sound conducted a poll to find the greatest book written on film.

- First place: David Thomson's The New Biographical Dictionary of Film (1975)
- Second place: Robert Bresson's Notes on the Cinematographer (1975), Andrew Sarris's The American Cinema (1968), and François Truffaut's Hitchcock/Truffaut (1966)
- Fifth place: André Bazin's What is Cinema? (1958–1962)

== See also ==
- Cinema of the United Kingdom
- The Film Daily annual critics' poll
- Independent cinema in the United Kingdom
- List of film periodicals
- List of films voted the best

Similar periodicals

- Cahiers du Cinéma
- Empire
