= Every Day Except Christmas =

- Opening titles
- Directed by: Lindsay Anderson
- Produced by: Karel Reisz; Leon Clore
- Narrated by: Alun Owen
- Cinematography: Walter Lassally
- Edited by: John Fletcher
- Music by: The Happy Wanderers
- Production companies: Graphic Films; Ford of Britain
- Release date: 1957
- Running time: 37 minutes
- Country: United Kingdom
- Language: English

Every Day Except Christmas is a 37-minute documentary film filmed in 1957 at the Covent Garden fruit, vegetable and flower market, which at that point was still located in central London. It was directed by Lindsay Anderson and produced by Karel Reisz and Leon Clore under the sponsorship of Ford of Britain, the first of the company's "Look at Britain" series. It was filmed by Walter Lassally.

Every Day and other short, mostly documentary films made within two or three years, reflected the concept of Free Cinema, films which were "free" in the sense that they were made outside the traditional structure of filmmaking.

== Accolades ==
The film received a BAFTA nomination for Best Documentary; and won the Grand Prix at the Venice Festival of Shorts and Documentaries.

== Synopsis ==
Opening with a title card dedicating the film to about seven or eight of the drivers/loaders and market workers whom we'll meet as the film progresses, Anderson establishes the rituals of the daily routine; the loading of the lorries, the post-midnight drive through the deserted country and city streets as, voice over, the BBC Light Programme's announcer says goodnight, signs off, and the national anthem "God Save the Queen" plays. "All these roads leads to Covent Garden" says the narrator, dramatist Alun Owen, and then there follows a montage of the market workers slowly beginning their night's work, work which they do 364 days a year. As the "streets are stirring", the vegetables and flowers begin to arrive and stalls are gradually set up; the overall pace of the editing picks up as the activity increases and the rhythm of night establishes itself.

The film's pacing reflects the activities it depicts. The steady pace of the loading and arrival at Covent Garden is followed by faster editing as Anderson introduces individual workers and shows their activities. The sequence includes conversations, jokes and tea breaks alongside the workers' regular tasks. A montage shows flower and vegetable boxes being opened and arranged for buyers, lorries being unloaded, and deliveries being made to stallholders before the market is ready.

So Every Day proceeds by respecting the dignity of the market workers and their roles in the rhythm of the market's operations. Then the pace slows again: it's time for a breather before the buyers arrive. This time Anderson allows his camera and the pace of his editing to focus on many of the individuals relaxing; these include not only the market workers, but the "night time habitués" of the market cafes where they can get a cup of tea, have a chat, snooze a bit, and prepare themselves for the next phase.

By 4 a.m. the market is empty, the streets are empty; the camera pans across silent rows of flower and vegetable stalls. We wait. "Daylight brings traffic back to the market" says the narrator, and the mood quickly changes. It's suddenly busier, noisier, and the film's rhythms reflect this. The familiar sound of the BBC Home Service announcer's "good morning" at 6.30am is heard against the arrival of many of the corporate buyers, those from the large store chains. By 7am business is brisk, and this is reflected in the many voice-overs we hear with snippets of conversation, orders being taken, porters given instructions, all the natural sounds of market activity placed over a montage of constant movement. Then, as movement is "steadily outwards" there is a sequence of porters (originally, we are told, all were women; only one remains, Alice, an elderly woman) with boxes of all sorts, many mounted on their heads, moving the produce and flowers out to waiting lorries and larger barrows.

As the market activity slows by about 8am, once again the film's pacing reflects a quieter time in the workers' day. Cafes are busy again and older female flower sellers, around since Queen Victoria was on the throne, we are told, look for bargains as we hear their chatter about the old days when every man wore a flower. "By 11am there's nothing left" and loading of big lorries going out into the country is well under way. In a montage of loaded lorries leaving the market (not surprisingly, perhaps, a few of which are made by Ford) the activities have come full circle: the market's day ends where it began, and film comes to an end with a review of the faces of the market workers to whom the film is dedicated.

== Critical reception ==
The Monthly Film Bulletin wrote: "It is a film of enormous technical skill: highly sophisticated poetic passages alternate with candid camera scenes as close to life as the people in Housing Problems. As a lyrical documentary it is clearly in the line of Song of Ceylon, and as good as anything since Jennings. Its real importance, however, is in its attitude – its intentness upon – the dignity of labour and workers and of the interdependence of our society, of which a market like Covent Garden is a highly significant symbol. ... There are many forms of the creative treatment of reality; and social criticism may be positive, as it is here, as well as negative. It would be hard to over-praise Walter Lassally's sensitive photography or Daniel Paris's musical score."

Critic Christophe Dupin noted: "The film evokes what Anderson has called the 'poetry of everyday life' and has the best lyrical qualities of the wartime films of Anderson's idol Humphrey Jennings."

== Home media ==
The film was released on the BFI DVD Free Cinema 1952–1963 (2006).
