= Murder of the family of Robert Einstein =

1944 Nazi German killings in Italy

Coordinates: 43°44′05″N 11°24′12″E

The murder of the family of Robert Einstein, a cousin of Nobel Prize Laureate Albert Einstein, took place on 3 August 1944 in Rignano sull'Arno, Italy, during World War II. Shortly before their withdrawal from the area, German soldiers arrived at the Einstein residence, executed Robert's wife and two daughters, and set the house on fire. Robert, who was in hiding at the time, survived the events but committed suicide less than a year later, on July 13, 1945.

The perpetrators of the crime were never brought to justice, despite attempts in the early 2010s in both Germany and Italy to identify them. The events were also the subject of a German documentary featuring Einstein's nieces who witnessed the events in 1944.

== Background ==
Robert Einstein was born in 1884 in Munich, the son of Jakob Abraham Einstein. Robert was a cousin of Nobel Prize Laureate Albert Einstein, as Hermann Einstein, Albert's father, was an older brother and business partner of Jakob Einstein, who persuaded his older brother to move their families and factory to Pavia, Italy.

In 1944, Robert Einstein, who had lived in Italy for many decades, resided with his family in Rignano sull’Arno, 20 kilometres (12 mi) southeast of Florence, in the Villa Tenuta del Focardo. His family consisted of Cesarina, his wife, the daughter of a Protestant minister, his two daughters Luce and Cici, 27 and 18 years old respectively, and his adopted nieces Lorenza and Paola Mazzetti, who were the 17-year-old twin daughters of his late sister-in-law.

In August 1944, the British 8th Army was advancing towards Florence, eventually liberating the city on August 4. Einstein himself had gone into hiding with local partisans as he was concerned for his life because of his name and his Jewish background. However, he considered his family not to be in danger.

== Murders ==
On August 3, a group of German soldiers arrived at the villa in search of Einstein. When he was not to be found the soldiers began vandalising the place and interrogated the women individually. The soldiers conducted an ad-hoc tribunal and then shot Einstein's wife and daughters in the garden. His nieces remained locked in the upper part of the house, guarded by a young German soldier who had refused to participate in the murders and was visibly shaken by the events. After the murders the two surviving girls were locked in a shed and the villa itself set on fire.

== Aftermath ==
Einstein returned to the house when he saw the flames (other sources state that he returned the following day). Upon finding his wife and daughters dead, he attempted suicide but was unsuccessful. British troops soon arrived in the area and Einstein used his famous surname to request an investigation into the murders. A few days later a scrap of paper was found, alleging that Einstein's family was executed because they were Jewish (they were not), and because they were spies.

Einstein pushed for an investigation of the crime and even requested help from his cousin Albert. There was an Army JAG report of the incident and the investigation. Einstein committed suicide on July 13, 1945, his 32nd wedding anniversary, by overdosing on sleeping tablets. He is buried alongside his family in the cemetery at Badiuzza.

His nieces Lorenza and Paola Mazzetti survived the war and were the subject of a German documentary in 2016.

== Investigation ==
In 2007, German authorities started an investigation into the events and interviewed Lorenza Mazzetti. Originally it was thought that the main instigator was still alive and living in Rhineland-Palatinate. In 2011 the case was the subject of an episode of Aktenzeichen XY… ungelöst, a German TV crime program, which aimed to find surviving eyewitnesses, especially the young German soldier who had refused to participate in the events. However, this effort was unsuccessful. Mazzetti visited Germany during the investigation and was convinced that she identified the main perpetrator of the crime after seeing a photo of him. The suspected perpetrator, known to the Simon Wiesenthal Center, is also suspected to have participated in a massacre of 184 civilians in Padule di Fucecchio on August 23, 1944 and lived in Kaufbeuren, Bavaria. A court in Rome passed a life sentence in absentia on the former soldier for this massacre, but Germany did not extradite him. The German authorities in Kempten, Bavaria, later also declared him unfit to stand trial.

== Documentary ==
The Mazzetti sisters, now dead, were the subject of a 2016 German documentary by the Bayerischer Rundfunk, titled Einsteins Nichten (Einstein's Nieces). As part of this documentary the sisters returned to the crime scene for the first time since the events.
