= O Dreamland =

1953 short film by Lindsay Anderson

- Opening title card
- Directed by: Lindsay Anderson
- Cinematography: John Fletcher
- Release date: 1953
- Running time: 12 minutes
- Country: United Kingdom
- Language: English

O Dreamland is a 1953 documentary short film by British film director Lindsay Anderson.

The documentary was made in 1953 by Anderson and his cameraman/assistant, John Fletcher, using a single 16mm camera and an audiotape recorder. Once completed, the film was initially shelved, with Anderson commenting, "you don't do anything with a 10-minute, 16-millimetre film. It's just there, that's all." In 1956 however, he was inspired to include it as part of the first Free Cinema programme.

The black-and-white film is a 12-minute exploration of the Dreamland amusement park in Margate, Kent and has no voiced commentary but a soundtrack of sounds recorded on site and music.

Gavin Lambert, a key supporter of the Free Cinema movement, said of the film "Everything is ugly... It is almost too much. The nightmare is redeemed by the point of view, which, for all the unsparing candid camerawork and the harsh, inelegant photography, is emphatically humane. Pity, sadness, even poetry is infused into this drearily tawdry, aimlessly hungry world."

== See also ==
- À propos de Nice - a 1930 French short made by Jean Vigo, who Anderson greatly admired.
- Listen to Britain - a 1942 short co-directed by Humphrey Jennings, another of Anderson's heroes, made in an impressionistic style.
