= Free Cinema =

British film movement

Free Cinema was a documentary film movement that emerged in the United Kingdom in the mid-1950s. The term referred to an absence of propagandised intent or deliberate box office appeal. Co-founded by Lindsay Anderson (but he later disdained the 'movement' tag) with Karel Reisz, Tony Richardson and Lorenza Mazzetti, the movement began with a programme of three short films at the National Film Theatre, London on 5 February 1956. The programme was such a success that five more programmes appeared under the ‘Free Cinema’ banner before the founders decided to end the series. The last event was held in March 1959. Three of the screenings consisted of work from overseas filmmakers.

== Background ==
Together with Gavin Lambert, Anderson and Reisz had previously founded the short-lived but influential journal Sequence, of which Anderson later wrote 'No Film Can Be Too Personal'. So ran the initial pronouncement in the first Free Cinema manifesto. It could equally well have been the motto of SEQUENCE'.

The manifesto was drawn up by Anderson and Mazzetti at a Charing Cross cafe named The Soup Kitchen, where Mazzetti worked. It read:

These films were not made together; nor with the idea of showing them together. But when they came together, we felt they had an attitude in common. Implicit in this attitude is a belief in freedom, in the importance of people and the significance of the everyday.

As filmmakers we believe that
No film can be too personal.
The image speaks. Sound amplifies and comments.
Size is irrelevant. Perfection is not an aim.
An attitude means a style. A style means an attitude.

At an interview in 2001, Mazzetti explained that the reference to size was prompted by the then-new experiments in CinemaScope and other large screen formats. "The image speaks" was an assertion of the primacy of the image over the sound. Reisz said that ‘An attitude means a style’ meant that ‘a style is not a matter of camera angles or fancy footwork, it's an expression, an accurate expression of your particular opinion’.

The first ‘Free Cinema’ programme featured just three films:

1. Anderson's O Dreamland (1953), previously unshown, about an amusement park in Margate, Kent
2. Reisz and Richardson's Momma Don't Allow (1956), about a Wood Green (North London) jazz club
3. Mazzetti's Together (1956), a fiction based on a short story by Denis Horne about a pair of deaf-mute dockworkers in London's East End.

The films were accompanied by the above provocative film manifesto, written chiefly by Anderson, which brought the film-makers valuable publicity. Later programmes brought in like minded filmmakers, among them Alain Tanner and Claude Goretta (with Nice Time), Michael Grigsby and Robert Vas. The two film technicians closely associated with the movement were Walter Lassally and John Fletcher. The three of the six programmes were devoted to foreign work, including the new Polish cinema (fourth programme), emerging French New Wave (fifth programme); and American independent filmmaker Lionel Rogosin was invited to screen his ground-breaking film On the Bowery at the second Free Cinema programme in September 1956. That event also included Norman McLaren's Neighbours and Georges Franju's Le Sang des bêtes.

== Characteristics ==
The films were free in the sense that they were made outside the confines of the film industry and were distinguished by their style and attitude and the conditions of production. All of the films were made cheaply, for no more than a few hundred pounds, mostly with grants from the British Film Institute's Experimental Film Fund. Some of the later films were sponsored by the Ford Motor Company or funded independently. They were typically shot in black and white on 16mm film, using lightweight, hand-held cameras, usually with a non-synchronised soundtrack added separately. Most of the films deliberately omitted narration. The film-makers shared a determination to focus on ordinary, largely working-class British subjects. They felt these people had been overlooked by the middle-class-dominated British film industry of the time.

The founders of the movement were dismissive of mainstream documentary film-making in Britain, particularly of the Documentary Film Movement of the 1930s and 1940s associated with John Grierson, although they made an exception for Humphrey Jennings. Another acknowledged influence was French director Jean Vigo (1905–34). Free Cinema bears some similarities to the cinéma vérité and Direct Cinema movements.

== Legacy ==
Free Cinema was a major influence on the British New Wave of the late 1950s and early 1960s, and all of the founders except Mazzetti would make films associated with the movement. Richardson directed Look Back in Anger (1958), A Taste of Honey (1961) and The Loneliness of the Long Distance Runner (1962); Reisz directed Saturday Night and Sunday Morning (1960); and Anderson directed This Sporting Life (1963) and If.... (1968).

Many of these films have also been categorized as part of the kitchen sink realism genre, and many of them are adaptations of novels or plays written by members of Britain's so-called "angry young men".

== See also ==
- British New Wave
- Direct Cinema
- Cinéma vérité
- Kitchen sink realism
- Karel Reisz
