= We Are the Lambeth Boys =

- Directed by: Karel Reisz
- Produced by: Leon Clore, Robert Adams
- Narrated by: Jon Rollason
- Edited by: John Fletcher
- Music by: John Dankworth
- Release date: 1959
- Running time: 52 mins.
- Country: United Kingdom

We Are the Lambeth Boys is a 1959 British documentary film directed by Karel Reisz. Filmed in the summer of 1958, it was sponsored by the Ford motor company as part of a 'Look at Britain' series. Lambeth Boys was one of the last films to be made by the Free Cinema movement, and offered a sympathetic portrait of the lives of young working-class people in South London.

== Plot ==
The film focuses on the lives and feelings of the young people such as Teddy Boys and girls who attend Alford House Youth Club in Kennington, South London. The protagonists act as if they are not being recorded at all because the film is shot in a naturalistic style. Lambeth Boys features life in the youth club, from dance nights to discussion groups, and life outside the youth club; work in postal sorting offices and factories, time spent with one another on the Kennington Lane estate or in a chip shop after a night out.

Cricket also features in the documentary; boys practising cricket in the yard of the youth club and then an annual cricket match between the Alford House Youth Club and Mill Hill School, played on a cricket field at the North London public school whose alumni association sponsored the Kennington youth club. After the match the boys are driven home on the back of a truck. They travel through the West End, singing songs and calling out to passers-by.

== Music ==
Jazz musicians Johnny Dankworth and His Orchestra provided the soundtrack for the film.

== Release ==
Lambeth Boys won the Grand Prix at the Tours Festival Of Short Film in December 1959. The song "Spring-Heeled Jim" by English singer, songwriter and author Morrissey (released in 1994 on the album Vauxhall and I) contains dialogue from the film.
