= Walter Lassally =

British filmmaker (1926–2017)

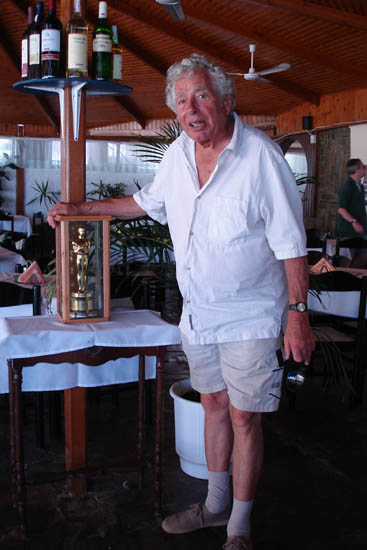
- Lassally in Crete with his Oscar
- Born: 18 December 1926; Berlin, Weimar Republic
- Died: 23 October 2017 (aged 90); Chania, Crete, Greece
- Occupation: Cinematographer
- Years active: 1946–2016

Walter Lassally (18 December 1926 – 23 October 2017) was a German-born British cinematographer. He won the Academy Award for Best Cinematography in 1965 for the film Zorba the Greek.

== Life and work ==
Lassally was born in Berlin, Germany. His family was Protestant by religion, but Jewish by ancestry. They moved to England in 1939 to escape the Nazis. He was closely associated with the Free cinema movement in the 1950s, and the British New Wave in the early 1960s. He worked in the early 1960s with director Tony Richardson on the film versions of A Taste of Honey (1961), The Loneliness of the Long Distance Runner (1962) and Tom Jones (1963).

Lassally also worked with Greek filmmaker Michael Cacoyannis between 1956 and 1967, and with James Ivory in the 1970s and 1980s. In the 1990s he moved to Stavros, near Chania in Crete, the town where he shot Zorba the Greek in 1963.

His autobiography, Itinerant Cameraman, was published in 1987. He was featured in the book Conversations with Cinematographers by David A. Ellis, published by Scarecrow Press in 2011.

He made his debut as an actor in Richard Linklater's Before Midnight (2013), where he played an older British writer settled in Greece. Lassally died on October 23, 2017, at the age of 90 in Crete, Greece.

== Awards ==
In 1965, Lassally won an Academy Award for Best Cinematography (Black-and-White) for Zorba the Greek (1964). This Oscar melted during a fire at Christiana's Restaurant, on the night of January 1, 2012.

On January 26, 2008, the American Society of Cinematographers (ASC) presented Lassally with an International Achievement Award at the 22nd Annual ASC Outstanding Achievement Awards celebration, at the Hollywood and Highland Grand Ballroom, Los Angeles.

== Filmography ==
- Passing Stranger (1954)
- Another Sky (1954)
- A Girl in Black (1956)
- A Matter of Dignity (1956)
- The Day Shall Dawn (1959)
- Our Last Spring (1960)
- Madelena (1960)
- Wild for Kicks (1960)
- Alice in the Navy (1961)
- A Taste of Honey (1961)
- Electra (1962)
- The Loneliness of the Long Distance Runner (1962)
- Tom Jones (1963)
- Psyche 59 (1964)
- Zorba the Greek (1964) - Academy Award winner
- The Day the Fish Came Out (1967)
- Open Letter (1967)
- Oedipus the King (1968)
- Joanna (1968)
- Assignment Skybolt (1968)
- Three Into Two Won't Go (1969)
- The Adding Machine (1969)
- Lola (1970)
- Something for Everyone (1970)
- Savages (1972)
- To Kill a Clown (1972)
- Visions of Eight (1973) (one sequence: "The Highest")
- Happy Mother's Day, Love George (1973)
- Malachi's Cove (1973)
- The Wild Party (1975)
- Autobiography of a Princess (1975)
- The Clown (1976)
- Pleasantville (1976)
- Attempted Flight (1976)
- The Great Bank Hoax (1977)
- The Woman Across the Way (1978)
- Something Short of Paradise (1979)
- The Pilot (1980)
- The Blood of Hussain (1980)
- Angels of Iron (1981)
- Memoirs of a Survivor (1981)
- Tuxedo Warrior (1982)
- Heat and Dust (1983) - BAFTA nominee
- Private School (1983)
- The Bostonians (1984) - British Society of Cinematographers nominee
- The Case of Marcel Duchamp (1984)
- Indian Summer (1987)
- The Perfect Murder (1988)
- The Deceivers (1988)
- Fragments of Isabella (1989)
- Diary of a Madman (1990)
- The Ballad of the Sad Cafe (1991)
- The Little Dolphins (1993)
- View Through The Window) (1994 )
- Crescent Heart (2001)
