= Sequence (journal) =

Sequence was a short-lived but influential British film journal founded in 1947 by Lindsay Anderson, Peter Ericsson, Gavin Lambert and Karel Reisz.

Anderson had returned to Oxford after his time with the army Intelligence Corps in Delhi. Ericsson was at New College, Oxford and had been a senior codebreaker in the Testery section at Bletchley Park during World War II. He was International Secretary of the British Labour Party 1955–1958. Lambert was a schoolfriend of Anderson from Cheltenham College who had dropped out of English at Magdalen College on discovering that he would have to study Middle English under C. S. Lewis, while Reisz was a chemistry graduate from Emmanuel College, Cambridge who later said "I met Lindsay Anderson on a Green Line bus. I was going to the British Film Institute to look at some film for my editing book, and he was going to see Ford's The Iron Horse."

Founded as the Film Society Magazine, the organ of the Oxford Film Society, in 1947, with Penelope Houston as its first editor, the journal quickly changed its name to Sequence, and produced fourteen issues between 1947 and 1952, the last few being edited by Reisz and Anderson. The British Free Cinema movement, co-founded in 1956 by Lindsay Anderson, Karel Reisz, Tony Richardson and Lorenza Mazzetti, drew on the principles first expressed by the journal. Articles from Sequence by Anderson were published in Lindsay Anderson: The Collected Writings edited by Paul Ryan (London: Plexus, 2004).
