= Gavin Lambert =

English and American writer (1924–2005)

- Born: 23 July 1924; East Grinstead, West Sussex, England
- Died: 17 July 2005 (aged 80); Los Angeles, California, US
- Citizenship: United Kingdom; United States (after 1964)
- Education: Cheltenham College
- Alma mater: Magdalen College, Oxford
- Occupations: Screenwriter, novelist, biographer
- Employer(s): The Guardian and The Sunday Times
- Awards: See below

Gavin Lambert (23 July 1924 – 17 July 2005) was an English and American screenwriter, film critic, novelist, and biographer. Described as "an incisive observer of life in Hollywood," his writing was mainly fiction and nonfiction about the film industry, particularly from a queer perspective. Early in his career, he was an editor for the influential journals Sequence and Sight and Sound, and a critic for The Sunday Times and The Guardian.

Lambert's screenwriting work earned him two Academy Award nominations for Best Adapted Screenplay, for Sons and Lovers (1960) and I Never Promised You a Rose Garden (1977).

== Early life and writing ==
Lambert was educated at Cheltenham College and Magdalen College, Oxford, where one of his professors was C. S. Lewis. At Oxford, he befriended Penelope Houston and filmmakers Karel Reisz and Lindsay Anderson, and they founded a short-lived but influential journal, Sequence, which was originally edited by Houston. The magazine, which lasted for only 15 issues, moved to London after the fifth issue, and Lambert and Anderson took over as co-editors. Lambert eventually left Oxford without obtaining a degree.

From 1949 to 1956 he edited the journal Sight and Sound, again with Anderson as a regular contributor. At about the same time Lambert was deeply involved in Britain's Free Cinema movement which called for more social realism in contemporary movies. He also wrote film criticism for The Sunday Times and The Guardian.

== Move to the United States and screenwriting ==
In late 1955, he moved to Hollywood to work as a personal assistant to director Nicholas Ray and worked on the script (uncredited) for Ray's Bigger Than Life (1956). Later, he co-wrote the screenplay for Ray's film Bitter Victory (1957). According to the critic David Robinson, Lambert was Ray's lover for a time.

Lambert became a notable screenwriter of the Hollywood studio era. In 1954, while still living in England, he wrote his first screenplay, Another Sky, about the sexual awakening of a prim English woman in North Africa. In 1955, he also directed Another Sky in Morocco. This was followed in 1958 by the Hollywood screenplay, Bitter Victory and in 1960 by Sons and Lovers. The latter, for which Lambert gained an Academy Award nomination, is based on a novel by D. H. Lawrence. The Roman Spring of Mrs. Stone (1961) adapted a novella by Tennessee Williams on the affairs of an older actress with a young Italian lover.

As, from the 1920s through the late 1960s, homosexuality was rarely portrayed on the screen, gay screenwriters like Lambert learned to express their personal sensibilities discreetly between the lines of a film. "The important thing to remember about 'gay influence' in movies," observed Gavin Lambert, "is that it was obviously never direct. It was all subliminal. It couldn't be direct because the mass audience would say, Hey, no way."

But then, in 1965, Lambert adapted his own Hollywood insider novel Inside Daisy Clover (1963) for the screen. Clover, starring Natalie Wood and Robert Redford, which tells the cautionary tale of a teenage movie star involved in the Hollywood studio system of the 1930s and her unhappy marriage to a closeted gay leading man. However, in the film version, he was not fully identified as gay because, at Redford's request, the husband he played was changed from homosexual to appear as though he might be bisexual. From this time on, Lambert and Wood became lifelong friends.

Another of Lambert's screenplays was I Never Promised You a Rose Garden (1977), based on a novel by Hannah Green, which describes in layman's terms a teenager's battle with schizophrenia. Later, the author also wrote the scripts for some TV movies such as Second Serve (1986) on transgender tennis player Renée Richards and Liberace: Behind the Music (1988) on gay performer Liberace. In 1997, he contributed to Stephen Frears's film A Personal History of British Cinema. He was heavily quoted in William J. Mann's book, Behind the Screen: How Gays and Lesbians Shaped Hollywood, 1910-1969.

== Biographies and non-fiction ==
Lambert was also a biographer and novelist, who focused his efforts on biographies of gay and lesbian figures in Hollywood.

According to screenwriter and writer Joseph McBride, he was "a keenly observant, wryly witty chronicler of Hollywood's social mores and artistic achievements." He wrote biographies on Hollywood figures such as On Cukor (1972) on film director George Cukor and Norma Shearer: A Life (1990) on the Canadian actress Norma Shearer. His book, Nazimova: A Biography (1997) was the first full-scale account of the private life and acting career of lesbian actress Alla Nazimova. He was the author of the memoir Mainly About Lindsay Anderson (2000) (whose title echoed that of Anderson's own work, About John Ford).

He also wrote the book GWTW: The Making of Gone with the Wind (Little, Brown and Company, 1973). Working as a Hollywood screenwriter, Lambert was able to interview and gain personal remembrances of most of the cast and crew involved with the film, including dismissed director George Cukor and star Vivien Leigh (Scarlett O'Hara).

His final biography, Natalie Wood: A Life (2004) contains numerous errors of fact. For instance, on page nine, Lambert misstates that Wood's mother "met and married" her first husband Alexander Tatuloff in 1928. Legal records show that Wood's mother married Tatuloff on 31 August 1925. On page four, Lambert misstates that Wood's mother was born in 1912. Legal records show that Wood's mother was actually born on 26 January 1908. According to Suzanne Finstad, Lambert's error-ridden book was written "to try to repudiate" her own 2001 publication, Natasha: The Biography of Natalie Wood.

Lambert's final book was The Ivan Moffat File: Life Among the Beautiful and Damned in London, Paris, New York and Hollywood (2004).

== Novels and short stories ==
Lambert also wrote seven novels primarily with Hollywood settings, among them The Slide Area: Scenes of Hollywood Life (1959), a collection of seven short stories that portray a bevy of tinsel-town lowlifes, Inside Daisy Clover (1963), The Goodby People (1971) about Hollywood's beautiful people, and Running Time (1982), a portrait of an indefatigable woman from child starlet to screen goddess, but also a unique life history of the American film industry. Other works of fiction included Norman's Letter (1966), which received the Thomas R. Coward Memorial Award for Fiction, A Case for the Angels (1968), and In the Night All Cats Are Grey (1976). In 1996, Lambert wrote the introduction to 3 Plays, a collection of works by his longtime friend, Mart Crowley.

== Personal life and death ==
Lambert's paternal half-aunt was Claudine West, who won an Oscar for co-writing the script to Mrs. Miniver in 1942. He became an American citizen in 1964.

From 1974 to 1989, he chiefly stayed in Tangier, where he was a close friend of the writer and composer Paul Bowles. He spent the final years of his life in Los Angeles, where he died of pulmonary fibrosis on 17 July 2005. He left behind a brother, niece and nephew, and named Mart Crowley executor of his estate.

His papers are currently housed at the Howard Gotlieb Archival Research Center at Boston University.

== Filmography ==
=== Film ===
Year	Title	Director	Notes
1954	Another Sky	Himself	Also director
1956	Bigger Than Life	Nicholas Ray	Uncredited
1957	Bitter Victory	Nicholas Ray	
1960	Sons and Lovers	Jack Cardiff	
1961	The Roman Spring of Mrs. Stone	José Quintero	
1965	Inside Daisy Clover	Robert Mulligan	Based on his 1963 novel
1971	Whoever Slew Auntie Roo?	Curtis Harrington	Additional dialogue
1972	I Want What I Want	John Dexter	Additional material
1973	Interval	Daniel Mann	
1977	I Never Promised You a Rose Garden	Anthony Page	
1978	Avalanche	Corey Allen	Credited as 'Claude Pola'
1987	Caftan d'Amour	Moumen Smihi	Story

=== Television ===
Year	Title	Notes
1954–58	General Electric Theater	2 episodes
1958	Lux Video Theatre	Episode: "Small Wonder"
1959	The Millionaire	Episode: "The Julia Conrad Story"
1959	On Trial	Episode: "Strange Witness"
1960	Startime	Episode: "Closet Set"
1961	The Barbara Stanwyck Show	Episode: "Confession"
1986	Second Serve	TV movie
1988	Liberace: Behind the Music	TV movie
1989	Sweet Bird of Youth	TV movie
1991	Dead on the Money	TV movie

== Awards and nominations ==
Institution	Year	Category	Work	Result
Academy Awards	1961	Best Adapted Screenplay	Sons and Lovers	Nominated
Academy Awards	1978	Best Adapted Screenplay	I Never Promised You a Rose Garden	Nominated
National Board of Review	1997	William K. Everson Film History Award	Nazimova: A Biography	Won
New York Film Critics Circle	1960	Best Screenplay	Sons and Lovers	Nominated
Writers Guild of America	1961	Best Written Drama	Sons and Lovers	Nominated
Writers Guild of America	1978	Best Adapted Screenplay	I Never Promised You a Rose Garden	Nominated
