= Lindsay Anderson =

English filmmaker, theatre director, and film critic (1923–1994)

- Born: Lindsay Gordon Anderson; 17 April 1923; Bangalore, British India (now Bengaluru, Karnataka, India)
- Died: 30 August 1994 (aged 71); Angoulême, Nouvelle-Aquitaine, France
- Education: Cheltenham College, Gloucestershire; Wadham College, Oxford
- Occupations: Film director, theatre director, film producer, screenwriter, film critic, actor, artistic director
- Years active: 1948–1993
- Father: Alexander Vass Anderson
- Military career
- Allegiance: United Kingdom
- Branch: British Army
- Service years: 1943–1946
- Units: 60th King's Royal Rifle Corps; Intelligence Corps
- Conflicts: World War II

Lindsay Gordon Anderson (17 April 1923 – 30 August 1994) was an English filmmaker, theatre director, critic, and actor. He was considered a leading light of the Free Cinema movement and of the British New Wave, and a principal exponent of kitchen sink realism on both the stage and screen.

As a film director, he is best known for his "Mick Travis Trilogy" of films starring Malcolm McDowell, the first of which, if.... (1968), won the Palme d'Or at the 1969 Cannes Film Festival and earned Anderson a BAFTA nomination for Best Direction. He was also a prominent stage director, both at the Royal Court Theatre and at the West End.

== Early life ==
Lindsay Gordon Anderson was born in Bangalore, South India, where his father was stationed with the Royal Engineers, on 17 April 1923. His father, Captain (later Major General) Alexander Vass Anderson, was a British Army officer who had come from Scotland. His mother Estelle Bell Gasson was born in Queenstown, South Africa, the daughter of a wool merchant. Lindsay was the second son. His parents separated in 1926, and Estelle returned to England with the two boys. In 1932 the couple tried to reconcile in Bangalore, and when Estelle returned to England she was pregnant with their third son, who was named Alexander Vass Anderson after his father. The Andersons divorced. Estelle married again in 1936, to Major Cuthbert Sleigh. Lindsay's father remarried while in India. Gavin Lambert writes, in Mainly About Lindsay Anderson: A Memoir (Faber and Faber, 2000, p. 18), that the father Alexander Vass Anderson "cut (his first family) out of his life", making no reference to them in his Who's Who entry. However, Lindsay often saw his father and looked after his house and dogs when he was away.

Both Lindsay and his elder brother Murray Anderson (1919–2016) were educated at Saint Ronan's School in Worthing, West Sussex, and at Cheltenham College. It was at Cheltenham that Lindsay met his lifelong friend Gavin Lambert, who became a screenwriter and novelist, and later the director's biographer.

The UK had been at war for 3 years when Anderson won a scholarship in 1942 for classical studies at Wadham College at the University of Oxford. In the next year he entered the Second World War, serving in the Army from 1943 until 1946, first with the 60th King's Royal Rifle Corps. In the final year of the war he was a cryptographer for the Intelligence Corps, based at the Wireless Experimental Centre in Delhi.

In August 1945, Anderson assisted in nailing the Red flag to the roof of the Junior Officers' mess in Annan Parbat, after the victory of the Labour Party in the general election was confirmed. Their colonel did not approve, he recalled a decade later, but took no disciplinary action against the junior officers.

Anderson returned to Oxford in 1946 but switched from classical studies to English; he graduated in 1948.

== Career ==
=== Film writing ===
Anderson was passionate about film, and with his friend Gavin Lambert, and Peter Ericsson and Karel Reisz, co-founded Sequence magazine (1947–52), which became influential. Anderson became a prominent film critic. He also later wrote for the British Film Institute's journal Sight and Sound, and for the New Statesman, a left-wing political weekly.

In a 1956 polemical article, "Stand Up, Stand Up" published in Sight and Sound, Anderson attacked contemporary critical practices, in particular the pursuit of objectivity. Taking as an example some comments made by Alistair Cooke in 1935, in which Cooke had claimed to be without politics as a critic, Anderson responded:

The problems of commitment are directly stated, but only apparently faced. …The denial of the critic's moral responsibility is specific; but only at the cost of sacrificing his dignity. … [These assumptions:] the holding of liberal, or humane, values; the proviso that these must not be taken too far; the adoption of a tone which enables the writer to evade through humour [mean] the fundamental issues are balked."

Following a series of screenings which he and the National Film Theatre programmer Karel Reisz organized for the venue of independently produced short films by himself and others, he developed a philosophy of cinema that was expressed in what became known, by the late 1950s, as the Free Cinema movement. He and other leaders in the field believed that the British cinema must break away from its class-bound attitudes and that non-metropolitan Britain ought to be shown on the nation's screens. Anderson had already begun to make films himself, starting in 1948 with Meet the Pioneers, a documentary about a conveyor-belt factory.

Anderson was invited to join the British Film Institute's Board of Governors in 1969 with the aim of bolstering support for independent British directors, but left the role after a year.

Anderson developed an acquaintance with one of his filmmaking heroes, John Ford. He wrote what has come to be regarded as one of the standard books on that director, About John Ford (1981). Based on half-a-dozen meetings over more than two decades, and Anderson's lifetime study of the man's work, the book has been described as "One of the best books published by a film-maker on a film-maker".

=== Filmmaking ===
Along with Karel Reisz, Tony Richardson, and others, he secured funding from a variety of sources (including Ford of Britain). Each of these founders made a series of short documentaries on a variety of subjects. One of Anderson's early short films, Thursday's Children (1954), concerning the education of deaf children, was made in collaboration with Guy Brenton, a friend from his Oxford days; it won an Oscar for Best Documentary Short in 1954. Thursday's Children was preserved by the Academy Film Archive in 2005.

These films, influenced by one of Anderson's heroes, the French filmmaker Jean Vigo, and made in the tradition of the British documentaries of Humphrey Jennings, (Note: John Caughie writes of the movement, "The model was the poetry of Humphrey Jennings's documentaries rather than the social responsibility of Grierson", but Jeffrey Richards comments, "in fact, in personnel, approach and philosophy they resembled nothing so much as the 'documentary boys' of the 1930s grouped around John Grierson. There was the same middle-class romanticization of the working class, the same commitment to a realist aesthetic, the same belief in location-shooting, the same rejection of studio artifice".) foreshadowed much of the social realism of British dramatic cinema that emerged in the next decade. These included Reisz's Saturday Night and Sunday Morning (1960), Richardson's The Loneliness of the Long Distance Runner (1962), and Anderson's own This Sporting Life (1963), produced by Reisz. Anderson's film drew some enthusiastic reviews but was not a commercial success, though stars Richard Harris and Rachel Roberts both received Oscar nominations.

Anderson is perhaps best remembered as a filmmaker for his satirical "Mick Travis trilogy", all of which star Malcolm McDowell as the title character: if.... (1968), set at a public school where pupils' discontent turns into armed rebellion; O Lucky Man! (1973), a Pilgrim's Progress–inspired road movie; and Britannia Hospital (1982), a fantasia taking stylistic influence from the populist wing of British cinema represented by Hammer horror films and Carry On comedies. The three films met very different receptions. Released shortly after the protests of 1968, if.... received highly positive reviews and was a box-office success internationally. O Lucky Man! polarised critics and was only moderately successful commercially. Britannia Hospital appeared during a conservative resurgence in Britain following the Falklands War, and when it appeared at Cannes the British delegation staged a walk-out; its critical and commercial failure badly damaged Anderson's self-confidence.

In 1985, producer Martin Lewis invited Anderson to chronicle Wham!'s visit to China, among the first-ever visits by Western pop artists. Anderson made the film Wham! in China: Foreign Skies. He admitted in his diary on 31 March 1985 to having "no interest in Wham!", or China, and that he was simply "doing this for the money". Anderson's own cut of the tour, titled If You Were There, was never released after George Michael objected to this version. It featured only four songs from the tour, instead focusing predominantly on the effects of the reform and opening up policies on Chinese society. Anderson was fired from the project, and Michael turned out the film that was entitled Wham! in China: Foreign Skies.

By the 1980s, it was remarked that Anderson was taken more seriously in continental Europe and in America than in Britain. In 1986, he served as a member of the jury at the 36th Berlin International Film Festival, by invitation. His last theatrical feature was The Whales of August (1987), shot in Maine with two Hollywood stars, Bette Davis, with whom Anderson had long sought to work, and Lillian Gish.

Anderson, who had acted at Oxford, occasionally took film parts. He played the role of the Master of Caius College in the film Chariots of Fire (1981). He also appeared in O Lucky Man!, as the director of a film of the same name, and played Dudley Moore's exasperated boss, a character heard only on the telephone, in Blame It on the Bellboy. (Note: Anderson turned down the role of the Emperor in Return of the Jedi; he had a low opinion of the Star Wars franchise.)

=== Theatre director ===
Anderson was also a significant theatre director. He was long associated with London's Royal Court Theatre, where he was Co-Artistic Director from 1969, and Associate Artistic Director from 1972 until 1975. He directed premiere productions of plays by David Storey, among others. In New York City, he staged Home (also in London, both with John Gielgud and Ralph Richardson), The Kingfisher (also in Britain, with Rex Harrison and Claudette Colbert on Broadway and Ralph Richardson and Celia Johnson in the UK), and The Holly and the Ivy.

=== Television ===
Between 1955 and 1956, Anderson directed five episodes of The Adventures of Robin Hood. This was his first experience of directing professional actors onscreen. Also in the 1950s he directed TV commercials for products including Kellogg's corn flakes and Lux Soap. Later he recorded stage successes of his for TV, including Home with Gielgud and Richardson for the Play for Today series (1972).

In 1978, Anderson directed The Old Crowd for LWT, from a script by Alan Bennett. Hyped before broadcast in the British press as a rare excursion by Anderson into TV work, it was then harshly reviewed. The experience soured Anderson towards British television, though in 1980 he directed Look Back in Anger for Showtime, and in 1989 Glory! Glory!, a satirical miniseries for HBO about televangelism. He also presented a documentary about Free Cinema for Thames Television in 1986, and narrated several documentaries about cinema, including Ingmar Bergman: The Director (1988) for Thames and D W Griffith: Father of Film (1993) for Channel 4.

In 1992, as a close friend of the late actresses Jill Bennett and Rachel Roberts, Anderson arranged a boat trip to scatter the women's ashes in the Thames River. Professional colleagues and friends were also on the boat and musician Alan Price sang the song "Is That All There Is?". Anderson included this event in his last work, Is That All There Is?, an autobiographical film for BBC-TV.

== Personal life ==
Anderson wrote in his diary in 1942, "It seems I am homosexual. It really is rather awful and I suppose I shall never get rid of it." Gavin Lambert, in his memoir Mainly About Lindsay Anderson, wrote about Anderson's homosexuality and repression of his orientation, drawing on his private diaries: this was seen as a betrayal by some of his other friends. This repression caused him intense grief by his later years, with writer David Storey stating, "Lindsay had a great battle with his homosexuality throughout his life. He just couldn't come to terms with it. This conflict was central to his life, and out of it came a terrible cynicism and an attitude that was more and more sour and embittered."

Anderson's friend and collaborator Alan Bennett wrote in a review of Lambert's book:

The great loves of his life map out his career: Richard Harris (This Sporting Life), Albert Finney (Billy Liar), Malcolm McDowell (If...) and Frank Grimes. None of them seems to have come across (if that, indeed, was what he wanted). They were all incorrigibly male... He never seems to have become inured to passion or grown a thicker skin, his last love for Grimes as strong and compulsive (and futile) as his first for Serge Reggiani... all the men Lindsay fell for were straight. (Note: Reggiani befriended Anderson during the filming of Secret People (1952), which Anderson was documenting for his book Making a Film, and hired him to help with a production of Hamlet he was mounting in Paris. Anderson cast Grimes in The Old Crowd and Britannia Hospital, as well as in multiple stage productions.)

In November 2006, Malcolm McDowell talked to The Independent about Anderson's sexuality:

I know that he was in love with Richard Harris. I am sure that it was the same with me and Albert and the rest. It wasn't a physical thing. But I suppose he always fell in love with his leading men. He would always pick someone who was unattainable because he was heterosexual. (Note: Anderson wrote about his feelings towards Richard Harris at the time This Sporting Life was in production during 1962 in his diaries.)

=== Death ===
Anderson died from a heart attack in Angoulême, France, on 30 August 1994, at the age of 71.

== Legacy ==
Following the publication of his diaries and collected writings in 2004, there has been a revival of interest in Anderson scholarship, including several edited collections and monographs addressing his work from a variety of critical perspectives. Malcolm McDowell produced a 2007 documentary about his experiences with Anderson, Never Apologize.

Every year, the International Documentary Festival in Amsterdam (IDFA) gives an acclaimed filmmaker the chance to screen his or her personal Top 10 favorite films. In 2007, Iranian filmmaker Maziar Bahari selected two of Anderson's short documentaries, O Dreamland and Every Day Except Christmas (1957), a record of a day in the old Covent Garden market, for his top 10 classics from the history of documentary.

The centenary of Anderson's birth in 2023 was marked by special events at the University of Stirling, where the Anderson papers are currently held.

== Filmography ==
=== Filmmaking ===
==== Narrative films ====
Year	Title	Director	Writer	Producer	Notes
1963	This Sporting Life	Yes	No	No	
1967	The White Bus	Yes	No	Yes	Short
1968	if....	Yes	No	Yes	
1973	O Lucky Man!	Yes	No	Yes	
1975	In Celebration	Yes	No	No	
1982	Britannia Hospital	Yes	No	No	
1987	The Whales of August	Yes	No	No	
1992	Is That All There Is?	Yes	Yes	No	Mockumentary

==== Television ====
Year	Title	Notes
1956–57	The Adventures of Robin Hood	5 episodes
1972	Play for Today	Episode: "Home"
1979	The Old Crowd	Television film
1980	Look Back in Anger	Television film; co-directed with David Hugh Jones
1989	Glory! Glory!	Television film

==== Documentary works ====
Year	Title	Notes
1948	Meet the Pioneers	
1949	Idlers That Work	
1952	Trunk Conveyor	
1952	Three Installations	
1953	O Dreamland	
1954	Thursday's Children	
1955	The Children Upstairs	
1955	Henry	
1955	Green and Pleasant Land	
1955	Foot and Mouth	
1955	Energy First	
1955	A Hundred Thousand Children	
1955	£20 a Ton	
1957	Wakefield Express	
1957	Every Day Except Christmas	
1959	March to Aldermaston	
1967	The Singing Lesson	
1986	Free Cinema	
1986	If You Were There	
1992	John Ford	Writer only

=== Acting roles ===
==== Film ====
Year	Title	Role	Notes
1949	Idlers That Work	Narrator (voice)	Short
1952	Trunk Conveyor	Narrator (voice)	Short
1952	Three Installations	Narrator (voice)	Short
1955	The Pleasure Garden	Michael-Angelico	Short
1968	Inadmissible Evidence	Barrister	
1973	O Lucky Man!	Film Director	Uncredited
1981	Chariots of Fire	Master of Caius	
1992	Blame It on the Bellboy	Mr. Marshall (voice)	
1992	Is That All There Is?	Himself	

==== Television ====
Year	Title	Role	Notes
1963	Der Schwur des Soldaten Pooley	Narrator (voice)	Television film, English-language version
1968	Play of the Month	Holz	Episode: "The Parachute"
1968	Omnibus	Narrator (voice)	Episode: "The Charm of Dynamite: Abel Gance"
1987	Buster Keaton: A Hard Act to Follow	Narrator (voice)	3 episodes
1989, 1993	American Masters	Narrator (voice)	2 episodes
1991	Prisoner of Honor	War Minister	Television film

== Stage directing credits ==
All Royal Court, London, unless otherwise indicated:

- The Waiting of Lester Abbs (Kathleen Sully, 1957)
- The Long and the Short and the Tall (Willis Hall, 1959)
- Progress to the Park (Alun Owen, 1959)
- The Trial of Cob and Leach/Jazzetry (Christopher Logue, 1959)
- Serjeant Musgrave's Dance (John Arden, 1959)
- The Lily White Boys (Harry Cookson and Christopher Logue, 1960)
- Trials by Logue: Antigone/Cob and Leach (Christopher Logue, 1960)
- Diary of a Madman (Gogol adaptation, 1963)
- Box and Cox (John Maddison Morton, 1961)
- The Fire Raisers (Max Frisch, 1961)
- Julius Caesar (William Shakespeare, 1964)
- Andorra (Max Frisch, National Theatre at the Old Vic, 1964)
- The Cherry Orchard (Anton Chekhov, Chichester Festival Theatre, 1966)
- Inadmissible Evidence (John Osborne, Teatr Współczesny, Warsaw, 1966)
- The Contractor (David Storey, 1969)
- Home (David Storey, also Morosco Theatre NY, 1970)
- The Changing Room (David Storey, 1971)
- The Farm (David Storey, 1973)
- Life Class (David Storey, 1974)
- In Celebration (David Storey 1974)
- What the Butler Saw (Joe Orton, 1975)
- The Seagull (Anton Chekhov, Lyric Theatre, 1975); in repertory with
- The Bed Before Yesterday (Ben Travers, Lyric Theatre, 1975)
- The Kingfisher (William Douglas Home, Lyric Theatre 1977, Biltmore NY, 1978)
- Alice's Boys (Felicity Brown and Jonathan Hayes, Savoy Theatre, 1978)
- Early Days (David Storey, National Cottesloe Theatre, 1980)
- Hamlet (Theatre Royal, Stratford East, 1981)
- The Holly and the Ivy (Wynyard Browne, Roundabout New York, 1982)
- The Cherry Orchard (Anton Chekhov, Theatre Royal Haymarket, 1983)
- The Playboy of the Western World (John Millington Synge, 1984)
- In Celebration revival (David Storey, Manhattan Theatre Club, NY, 1984)
- Holiday (Philip Barry, Old Vic, 1987)
- The March on Russia (David Storey, National Lyttelton Theatre, 1989)
- The Fishing Trip (Frank Grimes, Warehouse Theatre, 1991)
- Stages (David Storey, National Cottesloe Theatre, 1992)

== Awards and nominations ==
Institution	Year	Category	Work	Result	Ref.
British Academy Film Awards	1969	Best Direction	If....	Nominated	
Cannes Film Festival	1963	Palme d'Or	This Sporting Life	Nominated	
Cannes Film Festival	1969	Palme d'Or	if....	Won	
Cannes Film Festival	1973	Palme d'Or	O Lucky Man!	Nominated	
Cannes Film Festival	1982	Palme d'Or	Britannia Hospital	Nominated	
Chicago International Film Festival	1982	Gold Hugo	Britannia Hospital	Nominated	
Deauville American Film Festival	1987	Critics' Award	The Whales of August	Nominated	
Fantasporto	1983	Best Film	Britannia Hospital	Nominated	
Fantasporto	1983	Audience Award	Britannia Hospital	Won	
Valladolid International Film Festival	1964	Golden Spike	This Sporting Life	Won	

== See also ==
- Kitchen sink realism

== Bibliography ==
- Anderson, Lindsay (2004). Sutton, Paul (ed.). Lindsay Anderson: The Diaries. London: Methuen. ISBN 0-413-77397-3.
- Armes, Roy (1978). A Critical History of British Cinema. New York: Oxford University Press.
- Findlater, Richard, ed. (1981). At the Royal Court: 25 Years of the English Stage Company. Ambergate: Amber Lane Press. ISBN 0-906399-22-X.
- Lovell, Alan; Hillier, Jim (1972). "Free Cinema". Studies in Documentary. London: Secker & Warburg. pp. 132–167. ISBN 0436099187.
- Richards, Jeffrey; Aldgate, Anthony (1983). "The Revolt of the Young: If...". British Cinema and Society, 1930-1970. Totowa, NJ: Barnes & Noble. pp. 147–161. ISBN 0-389-20437-4.
- Robinson, David; McDowell, Malcolm; Anderson, Lindsay (1983). "O Anderson!: British cinema's most uncompromising son". In Lloyd, Ann; Robinson, David (eds.). Movies of the Sixties. London: Orbis Publishing. pp. 90–93. ISBN 0-85613-522-4.
- Taylor, John Russell (1975). Directors and Directions: Cinema for the Seventies. London: Eyre Methuen. ISBN 0413319202.
- Walker, Alexander (2005) [1st pub. Michael Joseph 1974]. Hollywood, England: The British Film Industry in the Sixties. London: Orion. ISBN 0-75285-706-1.
