= The Loneliness of the Long Distance Runner (film) =

1962 British film by Tony Richardson

- Theatrical release poster
- Directed by: Tony Richardson
- Screenplay by: Alan Sillitoe
- Based on: "The Loneliness of the Long-Distance Runner"; 1959 story by Alan Sillitoe
- Produced by: Tony Richardson
- Starring: Michael Redgrave; Tom Courtenay; Avis Bunnage; James Bolam; Dervis Ward; Topsy Jane; Julia Foster
- Cinematography: Walter Lassally
- Edited by: Antony Gibbs
- Music by: John Addison
- Production companies: Woodfall Film Productions; Seven Arts
- Distributed by: British Lion Films
- Release date: 21 September 1962
- Running time: 104 minutes
- Country: United Kingdom
- Language: English
- Budget: £130,211

The Loneliness of the Long Distance Runner is a 1962 British coming-of-age film directed by Tony Richardson, one of the new young directors emerging from the English Stage Company at the Royal Court. The screenplay was written by Alan Sillitoe, based on his 1959 short story of the same title, and concerns a rebellious youth who has been sentenced to a borstal for burgling a bakery. He gains privileges in the institution through his prowess as a long-distance runner, but reveries of important events before his incarceration that he has during his solitary runs lead him to re-evaluate his status as the prize athlete of the Governor.

== Plot ==
The film opens with Colin Smith running, alone, along a bleak country road somewhere in rural England. In a brief voiceover, he says that running is the way his family has always coped with the world's troubles, but that, in the end, the runner is always alone and cut off from spectators, left to deal with life on his own.

Colin is then shown with a group of other young men, all handcuffed. They are being taken to a borstal (a detention centre for juvenile offenders) named Ruxton Towers, where the inmates live in a series of Nissen huts with no privacy. The institution is overseen by the Governor, who believes that the hard work and discipline imposed on his charges will ultimately make them useful members of society. Sullen and rebellious, Colin immediately catches the Governor's eye as a test of his beliefs.

An important part of the Governor's rehabilitation programme is athletics, and he soon notices that Colin is a talented runner, easily able to outrun Ruxton's reigning long-distance runner. The Governor is especially keen on Colin's abilities because, for the first time, his charges have been invited to compete in a five-mile cross-country run against Ranley, a nearby public school with privileged pupils from upper-class families, and he sees the invitation as an important way to demonstrate the success of his rehabilitation programme.

A former runner himself, the Governor takes Colin under his wing, promoting him from dismantling scrap to performing light gardening work, and eventually giving him the freedom to do solo practice runs outside the barbed-wire fences. On these runs, Colin reflects on his life before he was incarcerated. His family lived a difficult, poverty-stricken life in a prefab in a lower-class district of industrial Nottingham. The jobless Colin indulged in petty crime with his best friend, Mike, while, at home, his father's long years of toil in a local factory resulted in a terminal illness.

When Colin's father refused treatment and died, Colin was left as the family's breadwinner, but he flatly refused a job offered to him at the factory where his father worked. The company paid out a paltry £500 in insurance money, and Colin watched with disdain as his mother quickly spent it all on extravagances. Colin symbolically burned some of his portion of the insurance money and used the rest to treat Mike and two girls they met to an outing in Skegness, where Colin confessed to his date, Audrey, that she was the first woman he ever had sex with.

Colin got into an argument with his mother's lover about who was the man of the house, and his mother told him to leave until he could bring home some money. He and Mike took to the streets, and they spotted an open window at the back of a bakery. They climbed in and stole the cashbox, which contained about £70 (equivalent to £1,300 in 2025). Mike wanted to take another trip to Skegness with the girls, but Colin was more cautious and hid the money in a drainpipe outside his house. A surly detective soon showed up and accused Colin of the robbery, but he told the man that he did not know anything about it. The detective later searched the house, but found nothing. Finally, frustrated and angry, the detective returned on a rainy day to say he would be watching Colin, and, as the two stood at the front door, the torrent of rainwater pouring down the drainpipe dislodged the money, which washed out around Colin's feet.

At Ruxton Towers, Colin must contend with his fellow inmates' envying him for the favouritism shown to him by the Governor, and he does not like being perceived as "the Governor's blue-eyed boy". He is especially troubled when Mike is sent to Ruxton Towers for stealing a car and, surprised by Colin's status, asks him whose side he is on.

The day of the race against Ranley arrives, with Colin and Gunthorpe, Ranley's star runner, seen as the favourites. Colin eventually overtakes Gunthorpe and gains a comfortable lead, but, as he nears the finish line, the imagery that has been flashing through his mind becomes progressively jarring. He remembers his mother's neglect; his father's dead body; the taunts of his fellow inmates; the beating of a Ruxton inmate as a form of corporal punishment; stern lectures from the detective, the Governor, and Audrey—and the realisation that winning the race will lead him back to Nottingham to inevitable labour work while life here is his escape from the real world. Just yards from the finish line, Colin stops, unmoved by the calls and protests of the Ruxton Towers crowd. He smiles defiantly at the Governor as Gunthorpe passes him and crosses the finish line to victory. Disappointed, the Governor walks away.

Some time later, Colin is back dismantling scrap, now ignored by the Governor.

== Cast ==
- Michael Redgrave as the governor of Ruxton Towers Reformatory
- Tom Courtenay as Colin Smith
- Avis Bunnage as Mrs. Smith, Colin's mother
- Alec McCowen as Mr. Brown, a new housemaster at Ruxton Towers
- James Bolam as Mike, Colin's friend
- Joe Robinson as Mr. Roach, an athletics instructor at Ruxton Towers
- Dervis Ward as the police detective
- Topsy Jane as Audrey, Colin's girlfriend
- Julia Foster as Gladys, Mike's girlfriend

Uncredited

- Ray Austin as Mr. Craig, a Ruxton Towers employee
- James Cairncross as Mr. Jones, the chaplain at Ruxton Towers
- Charles Dyer as Gordon, Mrs. Smith's boyfriend
- Frank Finlay as the clerk at the train station
- Derek Fowlds as an inmate at Ruxton Towers
- James Fox as Willy Gunthorpe, the fastest runner from Ranley School
- Peter Madden as Mr. Smith, Colin's father
- Philip Martin as Stacey, leader of Drake House at Ruxton Towers
- Arthur Mullard as the "Chief" officer at Ruxton Towers
- Robert Percival as the politician on TV
- Doug Robinson as a Ruxton Towers employee
- Anthony Sagar as Mr. Fenton, a Ruxton Towers employee
- John Thaw as Bosworth, an inmate at Ruxton Towers

== Production ==
=== Filming ===
Though set in and around Nottingham, all of the location filming took place in London and the Home Counties.

- The shots of Colin's family home, as well as the alleyway and the nearby main road, in what is supposed to be Nottingham were actually filmed in Gospel Oak in London. The main road is Gordon House Road, and the alley is just off from it.
- The road where they take the car is Chase Road in Acton. They pick up the girls on nearby Victoria Road.
- After picking up the girls and driving out to the country, they are actually in Whyteleafe in Surrey. The initial hill seen shows a bridge and tunnel leading to Maple Road, the view from atop it shows Riddlesdown Quarry.
- Ruxton Towers was shot at Ruxley Towers, Claygate, Surrey. A Victorian mock castle built by Henry Foley, 5th Baron Foley, the building had been used by the Navy, Army and Air Force Institutes during the Second World War. Today the house is a luxury development surrounded by mansions. It is the former home of Rolling Stones member Ronnie Wood.

=== Music ===
The film's original trumpet theme was performed by Fred Muscroft, the Principal Cornet (at the time) of the Scots Guards.

== Release ==
=== Box office ===
The film was a box-office disappointment.

=== Critical reception ===
On review aggregator website Rotten Tomatoes, the film holds an approval rating of 74% based on 23 reviews, with an average score of 7.6/10; the site's "critics consensus" reads: "Dry and full of angst, this British New Wave classic features potent social commentary and a star making performance by Tom Courtenay as a textbook example of the 'angry young man.'"

In a 2018 Time Out magazine poll of 150 actors, directors, writers, producers, and critics, the film was ranked as the 36th-best British film ever made.

=== Awards and nominations ===
- Most Promising New Actor (won) – BAFTA (Tom Courtenay)
- Best Actor (won) – Mar del Plata Film Festival (Tom Courtenay)
- Best Foreign Director (nominated) – Italian National Syndicate of Film Journalists (Tony Richardson)

== Analysis ==
Alan Sillitoe was part of the group of writers labeled the "angry young men", who produced media depicting the plight of rebellious youth. The film depicts Britain in the late 1950s and early 1960s as an elitist society in which upper-class people enjoy many privileges, while lower-class people suffer a bleak life, and portrays the borstal system of delinquent youth detention centres as a way of keeping working-class people in their "place". The characters are entrenched in their social context, and class consciousness abounds throughout. The "them" and "us" notions that Richardson stresses reflect the basis of British society at the time, and Redgrave's "proper gentleman" of a Governor is in stark contrast to many of the young working-class inmates.

Sillitoe's screenplay can be interpreted as either tragic or bathetic by ultimately projecting the protagonist as a working class rebel, rather than an otherwise rehabilitated, but conformist talent. During the period when Sillitoe wrote the book and screenplay, the sport of running was changing. The purity of running was taken away when Smith entered the race for his own and his institution's benefit, becoming a commodity useful for his patrons' own promotion. Sillitoe rejects the commoditisation of running in his book and screenplay, believing instead that a professional becomes commercialised and loses the clarity of thought that comes with running otherwise, which is why Smith chooses to forfeit the race. Literary critic Helen Small stated that "the weight of literary attention seems to be focused on a 'pre-professional era' – either written at that time or looking back at it for inspiration", her research stressing that Sillitoe was an author who believed in the unadulterated sport.

Running is also used as a metaphor to give Smith the ability to escape from the reality of his class level in society. The use of this sport gives Smith the ability to escape from his life as a member of the working-class poor. Sillitoe used running to give his character a chance to reflect upon his social status, and also to escape from the reality that the poor in Britain are faced with. Long-distance running gives the character an ability to freely escape from society without the pressures of a team, which may be found in other athletic stories.

== See also ==
- BFI Top 100 British films
- List of films about the sport of athletics

== Bibliography ==
- Petrie, Duncan James (2017). "Bryanston Films : An Experiment in Cooperative Independent Production and Distribution" (PDF). Historical Journal of Film, Radio and Television. ISSN 1465-3451.
- Small, Helen (2010). "The Loneliness of the Long-Distance Runner in Browning, Sillitoe and Murakami". Essays in Criticism. 6 (2): 129–147. doi:10.1093/escrit/cgp023.
