= Karel Reisz =

British filmmaker (1926–2002)

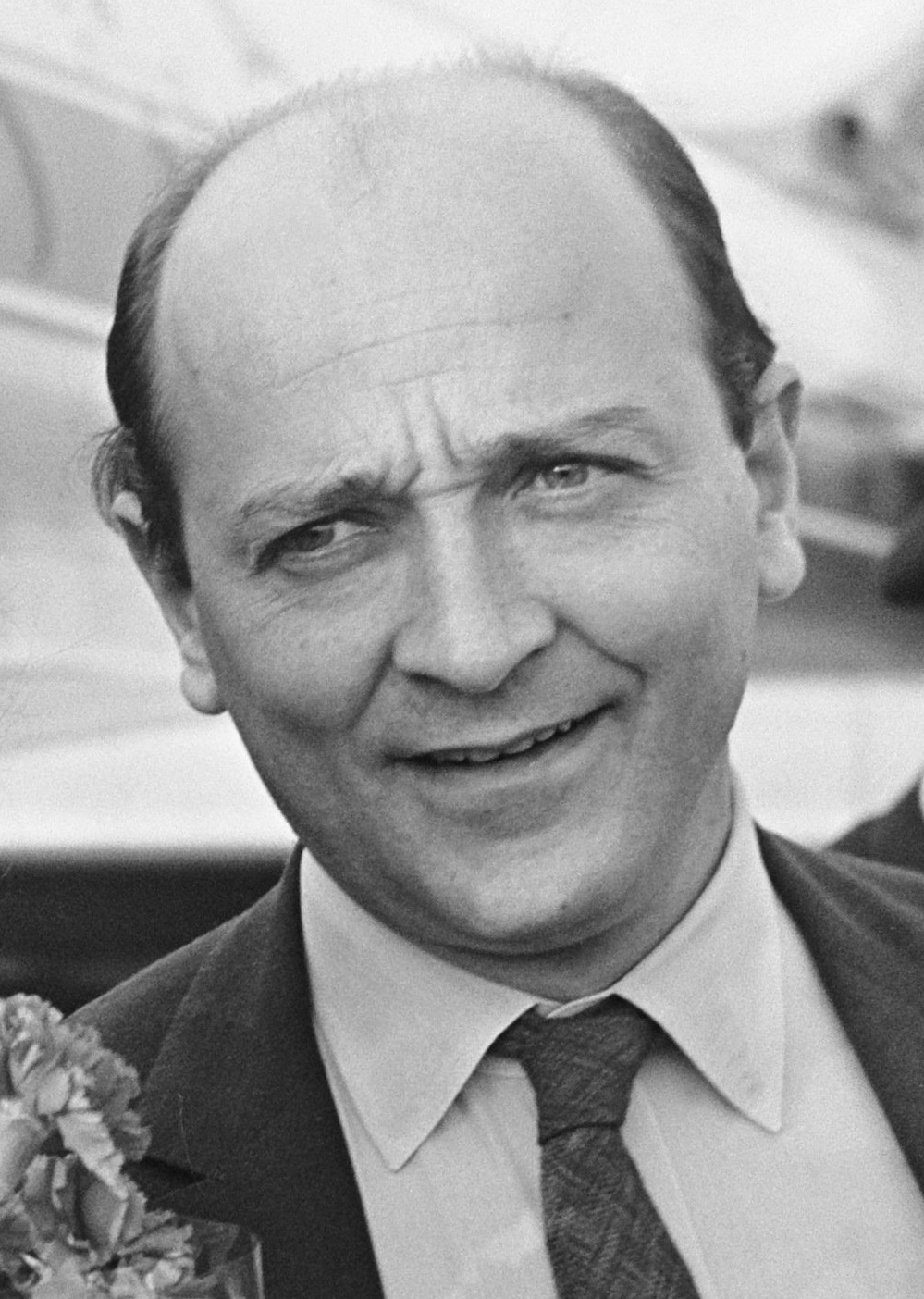
- Reisz in 1966
- Born: 21 July 1926; Ostrava, Czechoslovakia
- Died: 25 November 2002 (aged 76); Camden, London, England
- Occupations: Filmmaker; film critic
- Spouse(s): Julia Werthimer (m. 1953; div. 1963) Betsy Blair (m. 1963)
- Children: 3

Karel Reisz (21 July 1926 – 25 November 2002) was a Czech-born British filmmaker and film critic, one of the pioneers of the new realist strain in British cinema during the 1950s and 1960s. Two of the best-known films he directed are Saturday Night and Sunday Morning (1960), a classic of kitchen sink realism, and the romantic period drama The French Lieutenant's Woman (1981).

== Early life ==
Reisz was born in Ostrava, Czechoslovakia, to a family of Czech Ashkenazi Jewish ancestry. His father was a lawyer. Reisz became a refugee, one of the 669 children rescued and evacuated from the country by Sir Nicholas Winton.

He was transported to England in 1938, speaking almost no English, and he eradicated his foreign accent as quickly as possible. After attending Leighton Park School, he joined the Royal Air Force toward the end of the war. After the war ended, he learned that both his parents had been murdered at Auschwitz.

Following his war service, Reisz read Natural Sciences at Emmanuel College, Cambridge, and began to write for film journals, including Sight and Sound. He co-founded Sequence in 1947 with Lindsay Anderson and Gavin Lambert.

== Career ==
=== Free Cinema ===
Reisz was a founder member of the Free Cinema documentary film movement. His book The Technique of Film Editing was first published in 1953, and became a standard textbook in the field.

His first short film, Momma Don't Allow (1955), co-written and co-directed with Tony Richardson, was included in the first Free Cinema program shown at the National Film Theatre in February 1956. The next year he produced Every Day Except Christmas (1957), directed by Lindsay Anderson, followed by Band Wagon (1958).

Reisz and Anderson produced and directed March to Aldermaston (1959). Reisz alone directed We Are the Lambeth Boys (1959), a naturalistic depiction of the members of a South London boys' club, unusual in showing the leisure life of working-class teenagers, with skiffle music and cigarettes, cricket, drawing, and discussion groups. The film was chosen to represent Britain at the Venice Film Festival. (The BBC made two follow-up films about the same people and youth club, broadcast in 1985.) Reisz also produced I Want to Go to School (1959), directed by John Krish.

=== Early features ===
Reisz's first feature film, Saturday Night and Sunday Morning (1960), was based on the social-realism novel by Alan Sillitoe, and used many of the same techniques as his earlier documentaries. In particular, scenes filmed at the Raleigh factory in Nottingham have the look of a documentary, and give the story a vivid sense of verisimilitude. The film won the Grand Award for Best Feature Film at the 1961 Mar del Plata International Film Festival. It was successful at the box office and made a film star of Albert Finney.

Reisz directed a TV series, Adventure Story (1961). He produced Anderson's feature directorial debut This Sporting Life (1963), then he and Finney reunited on Night Must Fall (1964).

Reisz directed Morgan – A Suitable Case for Treatment (1966) adapted by David Mercer from his 1962 television play.

His fourth feature as director was Isadora (1968), a biography of dancer Isadora Duncan, with a screenplay by Melvyn Bragg that starred Vanessa Redgrave.

Reisz joined the British Film Institute's Board of Governors in 1969 with the aim of bolstering support for independent British directors, but left the role after only a year.

=== Hollywood ===
Reisz's first film shot in America was The Gambler (1974) with James Caan.

He made Who'll Stop the Rain (1978) with Nick Nolte and Tuesday Weld. He was meant to follow it with an adaptation of Brian Moore's novel The Doctor's Wife based on a script by Joe Eszterhas, but the film was never made.

Back in London, Reisz directed The French Lieutenant's Woman (1981), which was perhaps the most successful of his later films. Adapted from the John Fowles novel by Harold Pinter, it starred Jeremy Irons and Meryl Streep. In 1982, Reisz directed John Guare's Gardenia Dreams on stage in Boston.

He directed Sweet Dreams (1985), based on the life of country singer Patsy Cline, starring Jessica Lange. After it, he made a script about Libby Holman for Ray Stark, but it was never produced.

=== Later career ===
Reisz's last feature was Everybody Wins (1990), with a screenplay by Arthur Miller, and based on his play.

From 1991 to 2001, Reisz focused on theatre directing in London, Dublin and Paris. He directed an adaptation of The Deep Blue Sea (1994) for British TV. In 1995, he directed Moonlight by Harold Pinter, starring Jason Robards and Blythe Danner. At a Beckett festival at the Lincoln Center in 1996, he directed Happy Days. In 1999, he did Pinter's Ashes to Ashes, featuring Lindsay Duncan and David Strathairn, with the Roundabout Theater Company. At the Pinter Festival at the Lincoln Center in 2001, he staged A Kind of Alaska and Landscape. When the Gate Theatre filmed all Beckett's stage plays, Reisz did Act Without Words I (2001).

== Personal life ==
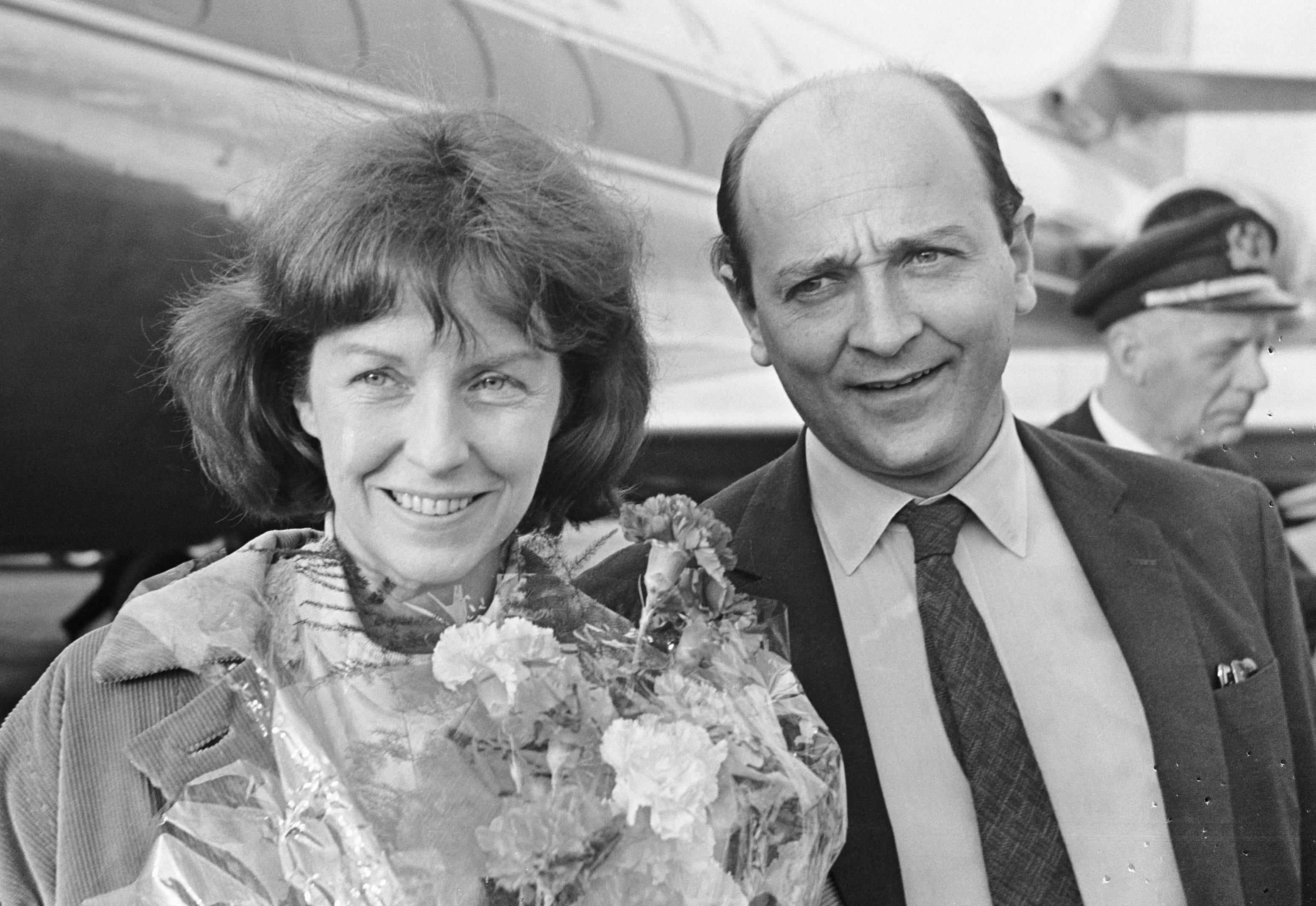
Reisz and Blair in 1966

Reisz had three sons by his first wife Julia Coppard, whom he later divorced. Reisz wed Betsy Blair, the former wife of Gene Kelly, in 1963, and remained married to her until his death.

== Filmography ==
=== Films ===
- Saturday Night and Sunday Morning (1960)
- Night Must Fall (1964)
- Morgan – A Suitable Case for Treatment (1966)
- Isadora (1968)
- The Gambler (1974)
- Who'll Stop the Rain (1978)
- The French Lieutenant's Woman (1981)
- Sweet Dreams (1985)
- Everybody Wins (1990)

=== Short films ===
- Momma Don't Allow 1955 (documentary)
- Every Day But Christmas 1957 (documentary about Covent Garden Market)
- We Are the Lambeth Boys 1958 (documentary)
- March to Aldermaston 1959 (documentary) about the first of the Aldermaston Marches

=== Television ===
- Adventure Story (1961) (6 episodes)
- Performance (TV series) (1 episode) (1994)

== Book ==
- Reisz, Karel (1953). The Technique of Film Editing. London: Focal Press. ISBN 0240521854.
