= Paul Danquah =

British actor (1925–2015)

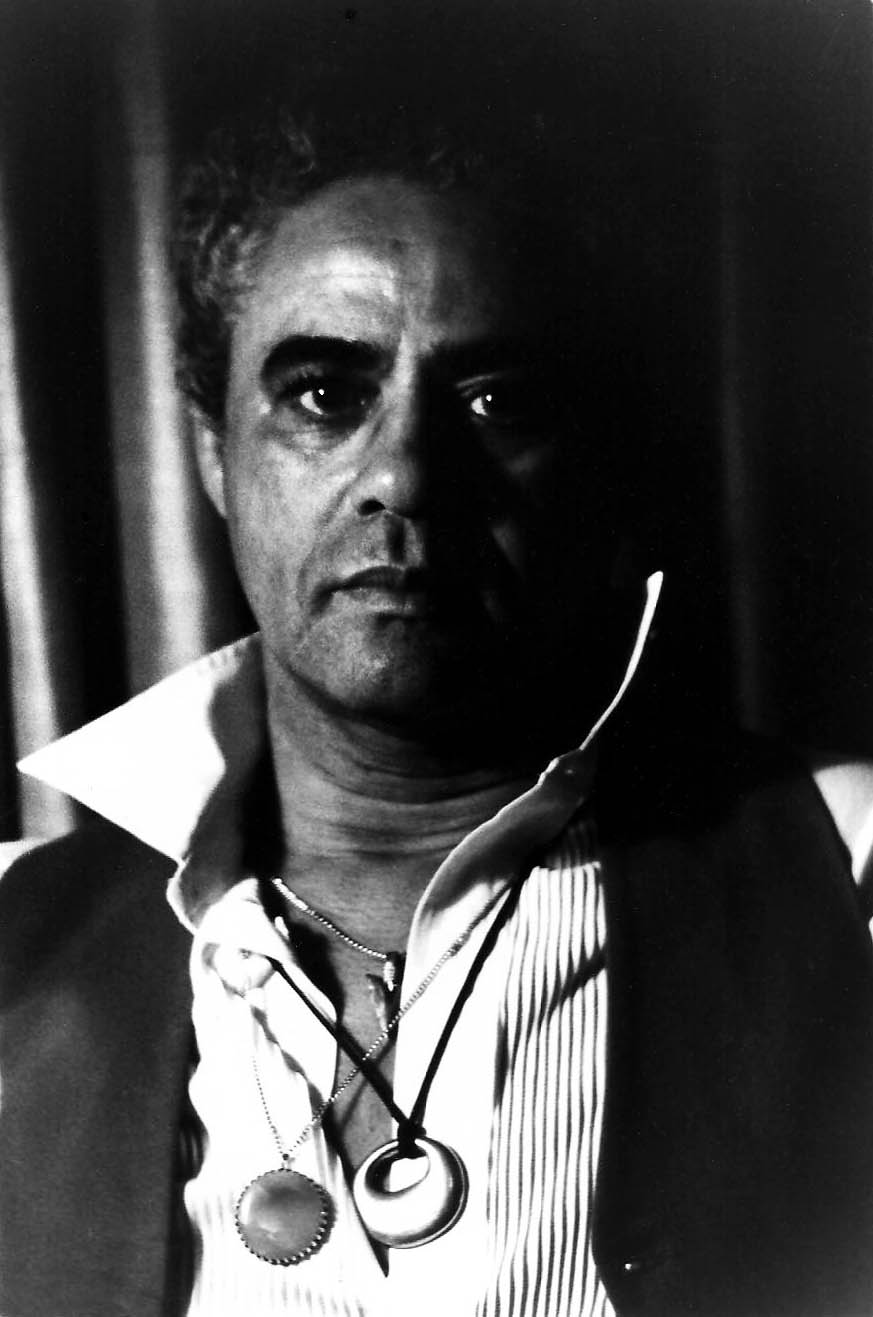
- Danquah in 1973
- Born: Joseph Paul Walcott; 25 May 1925; London, England
- Died: 13 August 2015 (aged 90); Tangier, Morocco
- Occupations: Actor, barrister
- Notable work: A Taste of Honey (1961)
- Parent(s): Bertha May Walcott and J. B. Danquah
- Relatives: Nana-Ama Danquah (niece)

Paul Danquah, born Joseph Paul Walcott (25 May 1925 – 13 August 2015), was a British film actor, known particularly for his role in the film A Taste of Honey (1961), adapted from the 1958 play of the same name written by Shelagh Delaney. He later became a barrister and a bank consultant. His father was the Ghanaian statesman J. B. Danquah.

== Life and career ==
He was born Joseph Paul Walcott in London, England, where he grew up. His mother, Bertha May Walcott, was English, and his father Joseph Boakye "J.B." Danquah was a Ghanaian politician and traditional aristocrat; Paul was the eldest of his many children from two marriages and various relationships.

Danquah studied law in Ghana and in Washington, D.C. Although Paul Danquah is frequently associated with the Inner Temple there are no records of his membership or call to the Bar there. He subsequently worked as a consultant with the World Bank until his retirement in 1986, and while living in Washington befriended African-American arts practitioners including Maya Angelou, James Baldwin, Roberta Flack and Nina Simone.

While still a student, Danquah made his acting debut in the British film A Taste of Honey (1961), featuring in the role of Jimmy. He shared a kiss with his co-star Rita Tushingham, which she claims was the first interracial kiss on screen. A review in The New York Times noted: "Paul Danquah in his movie debut as the Negro sailor, is gentle and subtle in a small but demanding role". He presented the BBC Two television series Play School in 1965 and is reported to have been the first black presenter of a children's programme in the UK.

Painter Francis Bacon lived with Danquah and Danquah's partner Peter Pollock (19 November 1919 – 18 July 2001) in their Battersea flat from 1956 to 1961. During this period, in late 1961, Danquah arranged for Don Bachardy to draw Bacon. Danquah moved with Pollock to Tangier, Morocco, in the late 1970s. In the late 1990s, Danquah and Pollock discovered a suitcase containing drawings by Bacon; these drawings were acquired by the Tate in 1996 and exhibited in 1999.

Danquah died in Tangier on 13 August 2015 at the age of 90; according to his niece Meri Nana-Ama Danquah, he was buried in Boubana Cemetery, beside Peter Pollock, as he had requested in his will.

== Filmography ==
=== Film ===
Year	Title	Role	Notes
1961	A Taste of Honey	Jimmy	Directed by Tony Richardson
1966	That Riviera Touch	Hassim	Morecambe and Wise comedy directed by Cliff Owen; Uncredited
1967	Maroc 7	Police Officer	Directed by Gerry O'Hara
1967	Smashing Time	2nd Exquisite	Directed by Desmond Davis (final film role)

=== Television ===
Year	Title	Role	Notes
1965	Armchair Theatre	Flecker	Series 5, episode 17: "A Voice in the Sky"
1965	Danger Man	James Owen	Series 2, episode 22: "Parallel Lines Sometimes Meet"
1965	Play School	Himself	Presenter
1966	Danger Man	Cleaner	Series 3, episode 6: "The Mercenaries"
1966	Danger Man	Barman	Series 3, episode 12: "The Man on the Beach"
1966	The Avengers	Lieutenant Razafi	Series 4, episode 16: "Small Game for Big Hunters"
