= Murray Melvin =

British actor (1932–2023)

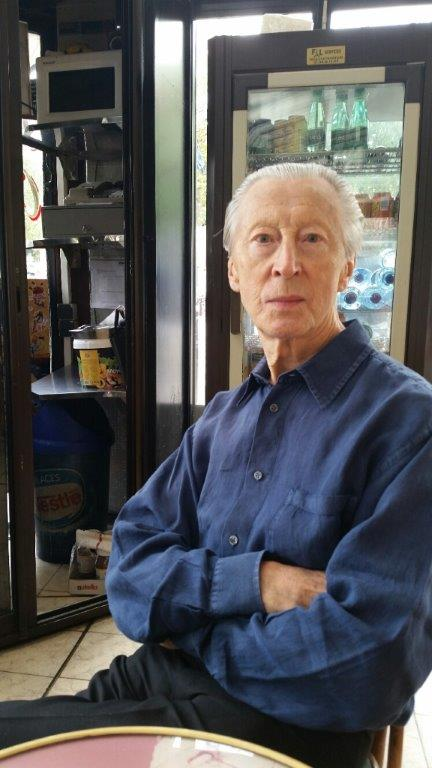
- Melvin in 2014
- Born: 10 August 1932; London, England
- Died: 14 April 2023 (aged 90); London, England
- Occupations: Actor; director; theatre archivist
- Years active: 1957–2023

Murray Melvin (10 August 1932 – 14 April 2023) was an English actor. A member of Joan Littlewood's Theatre Workshop company, he originated the part of Geoffrey in Shelagh Delaney's play A Taste of Honey, reprising the role in Tony Richardson's 1961 film version. He appeared in several Ken Russell film and television productions including The Devils (1971) and played Reverend Samuel Runt in Stanley Kubrick's Barry Lyndon (1975). Melvin's other notable screen roles include parts in Alfie (1966) and Torchwood (2007). He also worked as a theatre director and authored two books on the theatre.

== Early life ==
Melvin was born on 10 August 1932, in St. Pancras, London, the son of Hugh Victor Melvin and Maisie Winifred, née Driscoll. His father was an electrician in the Ministry of Public Building and Works until his retirement in 1967, when he was awarded the Imperial Service Medal. Melvin left his north London secondary school at the age of fourteen unable to master fractions but as head prefect, a qualification he said he gained by always having clean fingernails and well-combed hair. He started work as an office boy for a firm of travel agents off Oxford Street.

To help channel the energies of the young after the disturbing times of the war, his parents had helped to found a youth club in Hampstead, financed by the Co-operative Society of which they were longstanding members. A drama section formed with Melvin its most enthusiastic participant.

A short-lived job followed as an import and export clerk in a shipping office, during which he inadvertently exported quantities of goods to destinations that had not ordered them. This was followed by two unhappy years of National Service in the Royal Air Force (his father had served in the RAF during the Second World War).

Melvin was employed as clerk and secretary to the director of the Royal Air Force sports board at the Air Ministry, then based at Adastral House in Kingsway. Knowing nothing about sport, he considered his clean fingernails, well combed hair and his father's service had done the trick.

== Career ==
=== At Theatre Workshop ===
Melvin attended evening classes at the nearby City Literary Institute and studied drama, mime and classical ballet. During an extended lunch break from the Ministry, he applied to Joan Littlewood's Theatre Workshop company at the Theatre Royal Stratford East and auditioned on stage singing and dancing for Littlewood and Gerry Raffles. On being asked to create a character he knew from life, he impersonated a rather rotund director of the sports board. Having ascertained that he had to return that afternoon to work, Littlewood said to Gerry Raffles: "the poor little bugger, we must get him away from there" – which they did.

In October 1957, he became an assistant stage manager, theatre painter and general dogsbody to John Bury, the set designer, and he was cast in his first professional role as the Queen's Messenger in the then in rehearsal production of Macbeth. From the Scottish Court to a building site, his next performance was as a bricklayer in You Won't Always Be On Top, soon followed by a peasant in And the Wind Blew, Bellie in Pirandello's Man Beast and Virtue, Calisto in De Rojas's Celestina; Young Jodi Maynard in Paul Green's Unto Such Glory (all 1957) and then came the last play of the 1957–58 season, which was to be the start of an extraordinary year in the history of Theatre Workshop and Melvin's career. He was cast as Geoffrey in Shelagh Delaney's play, A Taste of Honey.

After the summer break in 1958, he played the title role in the seminal production of Brendan Behan's The Hostage. Both scripts had been transformed in rehearsals by Joan Littlewood's painstaking and inspired methods of getting to the truth of the text and building a lively poetic and dangerous theatrical event. Though both plays were to blow a refreshing wind through the British theatre, neither play transferred to the West End immediately, so Melvin stayed on to play Ebenezer Scrooge's nephew in Joan Littlewood's adaptation of Charles Dickens' A Christmas Carol (1958).

In February 1959, A Taste of Honey opened at the Wyndham's Theatre and transferred to the Criterion some six months later. It was the hit of the season. Melvin reprised the role of Geoffrey in the 1961 film version directed by Tony Richardson (1961). He won the Cannes Film Festival Award for Best Actor in 1962 and was also nominated for the BAFTA "Most Promising Newcomer" award.

In April 1960, William Saroyan, on a world tour, stopped off in London where he wrote and directed a play for Theatre Workshop in which he cast Melvin as the leading character called Sam, the Highest Jumper of Them All. Then the troupe paid their annual visit to the Sarah Bernhardt Theatre for the Paris World Theatre Season with Ben Jonson's Every Man in his Humour in which he played Brainworm. Rehearsals then started for Stephen Lewis's Sparrows Can't Sing in which Melvin played the role of Knocker Jugg. The following year he transferred to the role Georgie Brimsdown for the film adaptation of the play. The film was directed by Littlewood.

After a break of nearly two years, the company came together to create the musical, Oh, What a Lovely War! After its initial run at Stratford it went to the Paris Festival and won it. The company returned to the Wyndham's Theatre where the play won the Best Musical category in the Evening Standard Theatre Awards. Between the end of its London run and the opening at the Broadhurst Theatre in New York, the company visited the Edinburgh Festival with Shakespeare's Henry IV, Parts 1 and 2, in which Melvin metamorphosed as Gadshill, Shallow, Vernon and the Earl of March. The production of Oh, What a Lovely War! in New York in 1964 was his last for Joan Littlewood and the Theatre Workshop Company.

The production attracted the interest of filmmakers, including Ken Russell and Lewis Gilbert. Melvin became a member of what has often been called the Ken Russell Repertory Company, appearing in many of Russell's films, including The Devils and The Boy Friend. Lewis Gilbert cast Melvin in H.M.S. Defiant (1962), alongside Dirk Bogarde, and in Alfie (1966), where he played Michael Caine's work friend, stealing petrol and taking photographs to sell to tourists.

=== Work with Ken Russell ===
Melvin appeared in Russell's BBC television version of Diary of a Nobody, which was filmed at the Ealing Studios on a specially built 'silent film' set. Alongside Melvin, who played the errant son, Lupin, were other actors from Littlewood's Theatre Workshop, including Bryan Pringle and Brian Murphy, who also became Russell regulars. Lupin's girlfriend in the film is played by Vivian Pickles, whose performance at the Royal Court Theatre in John Osborne's Plays for England had attracted national attention.

Melvin was seen in a cameo in the final scenes of Isadora Duncan, the Biggest Dancer in the World (1966), Ken Russell's film of Isadora Duncan, which starred Vivian Pickles as the title character. Melvin's best known film role for Russell was as Father Mignon in The Devils (1971), the character who is the catalyst to the true-life horrors documented in the film.

After the film, Melvin directed two works by The Devils composer, Peter Maxwell Davies: the theatre piece Miss Donnithorne's Maggot and the opera The Martyrdom of St Magnus. Further work with Davies followed. He was the speaker in a production of Davies's Missa super l'homme armé and he played the Virgin in the premiere production of Davies's Notre Dame des Fleurs.

In Russell's The Boy Friend (1971), Melvin and another Theatre Workshop alumnus, Brian Murphy, are among the company players trying to catch the eye of a Hollywood producer who watches their provincial performance of Sandy Wilson's The Boy Friend. In the film, Melvin has a spectacular solo dance number in a caped French officer's outfit. He again had a cameo as Hector Berlioz in Ken Russell's Lisztomania (1975), as a test-run for a film about Berlioz that Russell was preparing.

Melvin appeared in Russell's film about the poet, Samuel Coleridge, The Rime of the Ancient Mariner (1978). Returning with the French theme, Melvin played an enthusiastic French lawyer in Prisoner of Honour (1991), Ken Russell's film about the French Dreyfus Affair.

Melvin remained a lifelong friend of Ken Russell, and was often seen with Russell at festival screenings of the director's films. At the Barbican screening of the director's cut of The Devils, 1 May 2011, Melvin and Ken Russell arrived together, with Melvin pushing Russell's wheelchair.

=== Other film performances ===
Melvin had an important role as Reverend Samuel Runt in Stanley Kubrick's Barry Lyndon (1975). In the video project "Stanley and Us", he talks about Kubrick's "57 takes (plus 20)".

Melvin was reunited with his co-stars from the film version of A Taste of Honey, Rita Tushingham and Paul Danquah, in the Swinging Sixties comedy Smashing Time (1967), in which he and Danquah had cameo roles.

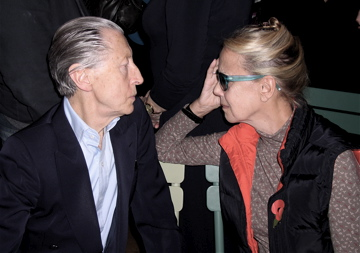
Melvin talks to actress Georgina Hale at the Young Vic Theatre 31 October 2007

Melvin co-starred with Russell-regular Oliver Reed in Richard Fleischer's film of The Prince and the Pauper, Crossed Swords (1977), and in Alberto Lattuada's four part television film Christopher Columbus (1985).

Peter Medak cast Melvin in five films: A Day in the Death of Joe Egg (1972), starring Alan Bates, Ghost in the Noonday Sun (1973, starring Peter Sellers), The Krays (1990), Let Him Have It (1991), and as Dr. Chilip in David Copperfield (2000).

Melvin featured in two films by Christine Edzard, Little Dorrit (1988), and As You Like It (1992). As Monsieur Reyer, the musical director and conductor of the Opera Populaire, he was cast in Joel Schumacher's film adaptation of the musical The Phantom of the Opera (2004).

=== Television work ===
Melvin appeared in the first episode of the television series The Avengers in 1960.

Melvin played the Dauphin in Shaw's St. Joan, directed in 1966 by Waris Hussein. He played Bertold in a Theatre 625 production of Pirandello's Henry IV (1967) directed by Michael Hayes; as Don Pietro in Peter Hammond's TV series based on The Little World of Don Camillo; and as the hermit in Mai Zetterling's production of William Tell. He also appeared in The Adventures of Don Quixote (1973) as the Barber in the BBC television film directed by Alvin Rakoff and starring Rex Harrison.

Melvin starred in The Tyrant King (1968), the six-part children's television series directed by Mike Hodges. He played a crucial role in the last two episodes of The Flaxton Boys (1973), where he plays the upper-class twit, Gerald Meder. In 1994, Melvin supplied the voice of the villain Lucius on the British children's animated TV series Oscar's Orchestra for the BBC and France 3. Melvin appeared in a Christmas Special episode of the BBC's Jonathan Creek called "The Black Canary" (1998).

In 2007 he appeared as the sinister Bilis Manger in the Doctor Who spinoff Torchwood, a role he then reprised for Big Finish Productions from 2017 on. In July 2011 Melvin played the Professor in a short comedy/drama called The Grey Mile, a story about two ex-master criminals who are now confined to a care home.

=== Other work ===
Melvin was a founding member of the Actors' Centre and was its chairman for four years during which time he started a centre in Manchester in honour of Joan Littlewood and the Theatre Workshop.

As a theatre director, he worked across all genres including opera, recital, drama and comedy. He directed the first productions of three of Graeme Garden's perennially popular pantomimes.

In 1991, 34 years after becoming assistant stage manager at the Theatre Royal, he joined the theatre's board, a position he held until 2011. During this period, he also became recognised for his work as a theatre and film historian. For example, he appears as a contributor on the BFI DVD release of the Bill Douglas Trilogy, where he provides historical commentary.

In 1992, he became the Theatre Royal's voluntary archivist and in 2009 he was appointed a member of the Theatre Workshop Trust. He led the successful campaign to erect a statue of Joan Littlewood in Theatre Square at Stratford. In 2020, he completed an archive covering the theatre's history between 1884 and 2017.

On 18 July 2013, he was awarded an honorary degree of Doctor of Arts by De Montfort University and in July 2015 he was awarded an honorary degree by the University of Essex. In September 2016 he received an Honorary Fellowship from the Rose Bruford College.

Several commercial available audio recordings have been made featuring Murray Melvin. These include four plays on LPs produced by Caedmon Records (Two Gentlemen of Verona (1965); A Midsummer Night's Dream; George Bernard Shaw's Saint Joan (1966); and The Poetry of Kipling). His performance in Oh, What a Lovely War is available on Decca Records (1969).

In 2007, he narrated Tales of the Supernatural Volume 3 by M. R. James for Fantom Films. This was followed in 2009 by M.R. James - A Ghost Story for Christmas, and in 2011 and 2012 by two recordings of Wilkie Collins: Supernatural Stories, Volumes 2 & 3 and The Dark Shadows Legend: The Happier Dead.

== Personal life and death ==
In December 2022, Melvin suffered a fall from which he never fully recovered. He died at St Thomas' Hospital in London on 14 April 2023, at the age of 90. Without any living close relatives at the time of his death, he had former Stratford East director Kerry Kyriacos Michael appointed as his next of kin.

== Selected filmography ==
- The Criminal (1960) – Antlers
- Suspect (1960) – Teddy Boy
- A Taste of Honey (1961) – Geoffrey Ingham
- Petticoat Pirates (1961) – Kenneth
- Solo for Sparrow (1962) – Larkin (Edgar Wallace Mysteries)
- H.M.S. Defiant (1962) – Wagstaffe
- Sparrows Can't Sing (1963) – Georgie
- The Ceremony (1963) – First Gendaime
- Alfie (1966) – Nat
- Kaleidoscope (1966) – Aimes
- Smashing Time (1967) – 1st Exquisite
- The Fixer (1968) – Priest
- Start the Revolution Without Me (1970) – Blind Man
- The Devils (1971) – Mignon
- The Boy Friend (1971) – Alphonse
- A Day in the Death of Joe Egg (1972) – Doctor
- Gawain and the Green Knight (1973) – Seneschal
- Ghost in the Noonday Sun (1973) – Hamidos
- Ghost Story (1974) – Mc Fayden
- Lisztomania (1975) – Hector Berlioz
- Barry Lyndon (1975) – Rev. Samuel Runt
- Shout at the Devil (1976) – Lt. Phipps
- The Bawdy Adventures of Tom Jones (1976) – Blifil
- The Ballad of Salomon Pavey (1977)
- Gulliver's Travels (voice, 1977)
- Joseph Andrews (1977) – Beau Didapper
- The Prince and the Pauper (1977) – Prince's Dresser
- Stories from a Flying Trunk (1979) – Hans Christian Andersen
- Nutcracker (1982) – Leopold
- Sacred Hearts (1985) – Father Power
- Christopher Columbus (1985) – Father Linares
- Comrades (1986) – Clerk
- Funny Boy (1987) – Arthur
- Little Dorrit (1988) – Dancing Master
- Testimony (1988) – Film Editor
- Slipstream (1989) – Man on Stairs
- The Krays (1990) – Newsagent
- The Fool (1990) – Jeremy Ruttle
- Let Him Have It (1991) – Secondary School Teacher
- Prisoner of Honour (1991) – Bertillon
- As You Like It (1992) – Sir Oliver Martext
- Princess Caraboo (1994) – Lord Motley
- England, My England (1995) – Anthony Ashley Cooper, Earl of Shaftesbury
- Alice in Wonderland (1999) – Chief Executioner
- The Emperor's New Clothes (2001) – Antommarchi
- The Phantom of the Opera (2004) – Reyer
- The Grey Mile (2012) – Professor Worth
- The Lost City of Z (2016) – Lord James Bernard

== Selected theatre performances (as an actor) ==
- Queen's Messenger in Shakespeare's Macbeth (1957)
- Calisto in De Roja's La Celestina (1958)
- Jodie in Paul Green's Unto Such Glory (1958)
- Scrooge's Nephew in Dickens' A Christmas Carol (1958)
- Geoffrey in Shelagh Delaney's A Taste of Honey (1958)
- Leslie in Brendan Behan's The Hostage (1958)
- Sam in William Saroyan's Sam, The Highest Jumper of Them All
- Brainworm in Ben Johnson's Every Man in His Humour (1960)
- Gadshill, Shallow, Earl of March and Vernon in Shakespeare's Henry IV (Pts 1 & 2) (1960)
- Knocker in Stephen Lewis's Sparrers Can't Sing (1960)
- Theatre Workshop's Company musical Oh, What a Lovely War (1963)
- Waterhouse and Hall's revue England Our England (1963)
- Adolphus in Bernard Shaw's Trifles and Tomfooleries (1967)
- Boy in Arthur Kopit's Oh Dad. Poor Dad (1965)
- Bouzin in Georges Feydeau's Cat Among the Pigeons (adapted by John Mortimer) (1969)
- Dufausset in Georges Feydeau's The Pig in a Poke
- Gilbert in Willis Hall's Kidnapped at Christmas (1975)
- Dorset in Rosemary Anne Sisson's The Dark Horse (1978)
- Arthur Deakin in Ridley's The Ghost Train
- The Dauphin in Bernard Shaw's Saint Joan
- Charlie Boy in Iain Blair's Mulligan's Last Case
- Etienne in Georges Feydeau's French Dressing
- The Spirits of Christmas in Musgrave's Opera A Christmas Carol
- Ko-Ko in Gilbert & Sullivan's The Mikado
- Fiddler in Henry Living's Don't Touch Him He Might Resent It
- Backbite in Sheridan's A School For Scandal
- Ephraim Smooth in O'Keefe's Wild Oats
- Jacopone in Peter Barnes's Sunsets and Glories (1990)
- Anton Zagorestky in Griboyedov/Anthony Burgess' Chatsky (or The Importance of Being Stupid) (1993)
- Konrad in Ludwig Holberg/Kenneth McLeish's Jeppe of the Hill (1994)
- Father Domingo in Schiller's Don Carlos
- Ratty in Willis Hall's Musical version of The Wind in the Willows
- Hopkins in Patrick Prior's The Lodger
- Oliver Nashwick in Rodney Ackland's After October (1997)
- The Priest in Schiller's The Robbers (1998)
- Coupler in John Vanburgh's The Relapse (1998)
- Don Perlimpin in Lorca's The Love of Don Perlimplín and Belisa in the Garden
- Burrus in Racine's Brittanicus
- Cool in Boucicault's London Assurance
- Tireseas and Chorus in Seamus Heaney's The Burial at Thebes (2008)

== Selected music theatre performances ==
- Narrator, Walton's Facade
- Narrator, The Poetry And Songs of Leo Aylen
- Narrator, Geoffrey King's King Arthur's Dream
- Devil, Stravinsky's The Soldiers Tale
- Narrator, Stravinsky's The Soldiers Tale
- Performer, Maxwell Davies's Missa super l'homme armé
- Virgin, Maxwell Davies's Notre Dame Des Fleur
- Da Ponte Rennison & Melvin's Roses and Laurels

== Selected theatre and opera performances as a director ==
- Miss Donnithorne's Magot (1976)
- The Martydom of St. Magnus (1977)
- The Raft of the Medusa (1977)
- The Mime of Nick, Mick and the Maggies (1978)
- Cinderella (1979)
- Aladdin (1980)
- Quack Quack (1980)
- The Sleeping Beauty (1984)
- Don't Touch Him, He Might Resent It (1982)
- Jack The Giant Killer (1985)
- Puss in Boots (1986)
- Adventures of Huckleberry Finn (1987)
- Sinbad The Sailor (1987)
- Brotherly Love (1988)

== Selected television performances ==
- Salesman in Small Fish Are Sweet (1959)
- Lupin in The Diary of a Nobody (1964)
- Dauphin in St. Joan (Shaw)
- Turgis in Angel Pavement
- Teddy Boy in Paradise Street Series
- Reporter in Isadora Duncan (1966)
- Bertold in Henry IV (Pirandello, 1967)
- Thumb in The Memorandum (1967)
- Gerald Gould in The Tyrant King, (1968)
- Hoopdriver in The Wheels of Chance
- Robert Lovell in The Rime of the Ancient Mariner
- Nathaniel Giles in The Ballad of Salomon Pavey (1977)
- Don Pietro in The Little World of Dom Camillo
- The Devil in The Soldier's Tale
- Spirits of Christmas in A Christmas Carol
- Jack Spratt in Bulman
- Hermit in William Tell (1992)
- Ignatius in T. Bag and the Sunstones Of Montezuma (episode One Million Years B.C.)
- Clerk in Doomsday Gun (1994)
- Roger Parry in Cone Zones (episode One for the Money, 1985)
- Lord Shaftesbury in England, My England
- Lucius in Oscar's Orchestra
- Architect in The Village
- Delamere in Bugs
- Lionel Prekopp in Jonathan Creek
- Caravaggio in Starhunter Series
- Da Ponte in The Genius of Mozart
- King of the Knight in Tom's Christmas Tree (2006)
- Bilis Manger in Torchwood (2006)
- Librarian in The Village (2010)
- Caravaggio in Starhunter Redux Series (2017)

== Recognition ==
- Honorary Doctorate of Arts. De Montfort University 18 July 2013
- Honorary Degree. University of Essex 17 July 2015
- Honorary Fellowship. Rose Bruford College 16 September 2016
- The National Portrait Gallery, London holds several portraits of Melvin in its permanent collection.

== Bibliography ==
- The Art of the Theatre Workshop, compiled and introduced by Murray Melvin (2006)
- The Theatre Royal. A History of the Building, Murray Melvin (2009)
- The Authorised Biography of Ken Russell, Vol 1. Becoming Ken Russell, Paul Sutton (2012).
