= 15th British Academy Film Awards =

1962 film awards ceremony

- Date: 1962

Highlights
- Best Film: Ballad of a Soldier & The Hustler
- Best British Film: A Taste of Honey
- Most awards: A Taste of Honey (4)
- Most nominations: A Taste of Honey (6)

The 15th British Academy Film Awards, given by the British Academy of Film and Television Arts in 1962, honoured the best films of 1961.

== Winners and nominees ==
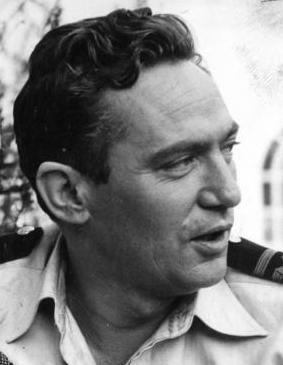
Peter Finch, Best British Actor winner

Paul Newman, Best Foreign Actor winner

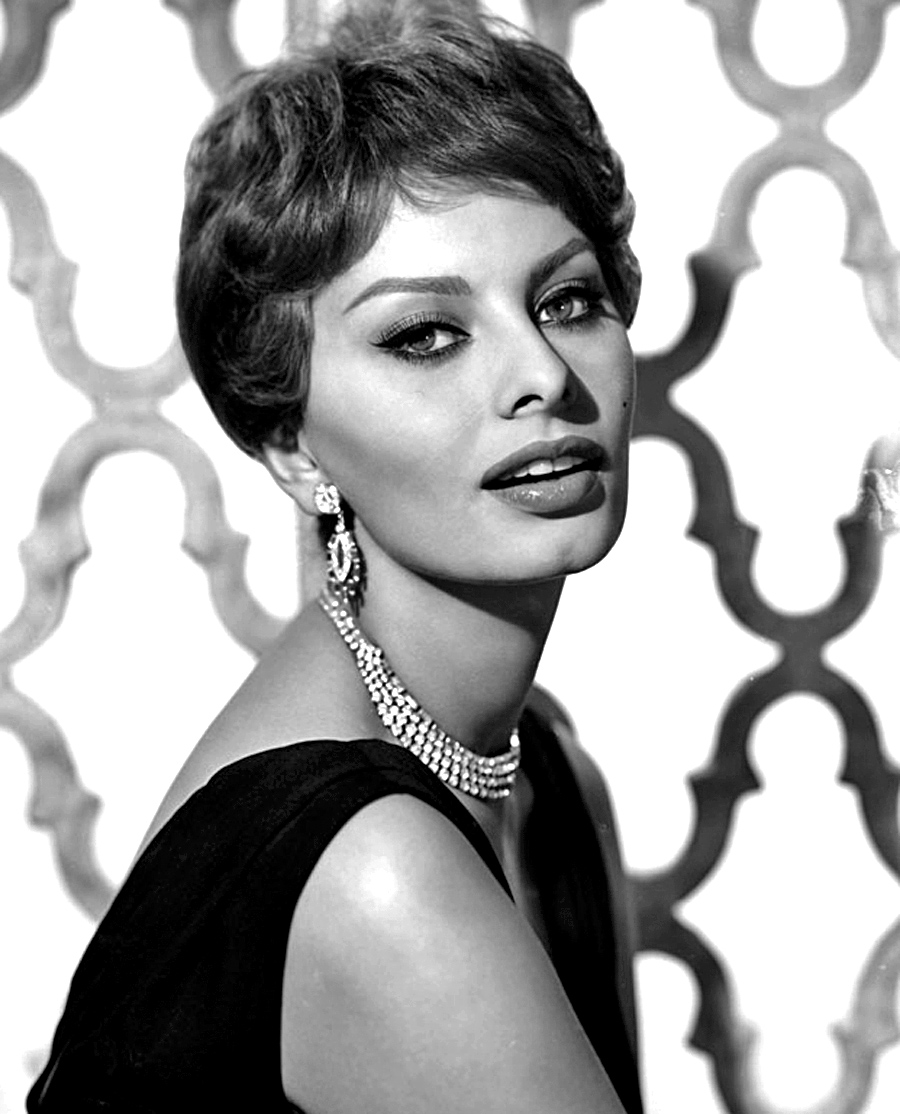
Sophia Loren, Best Foreign Actress winner

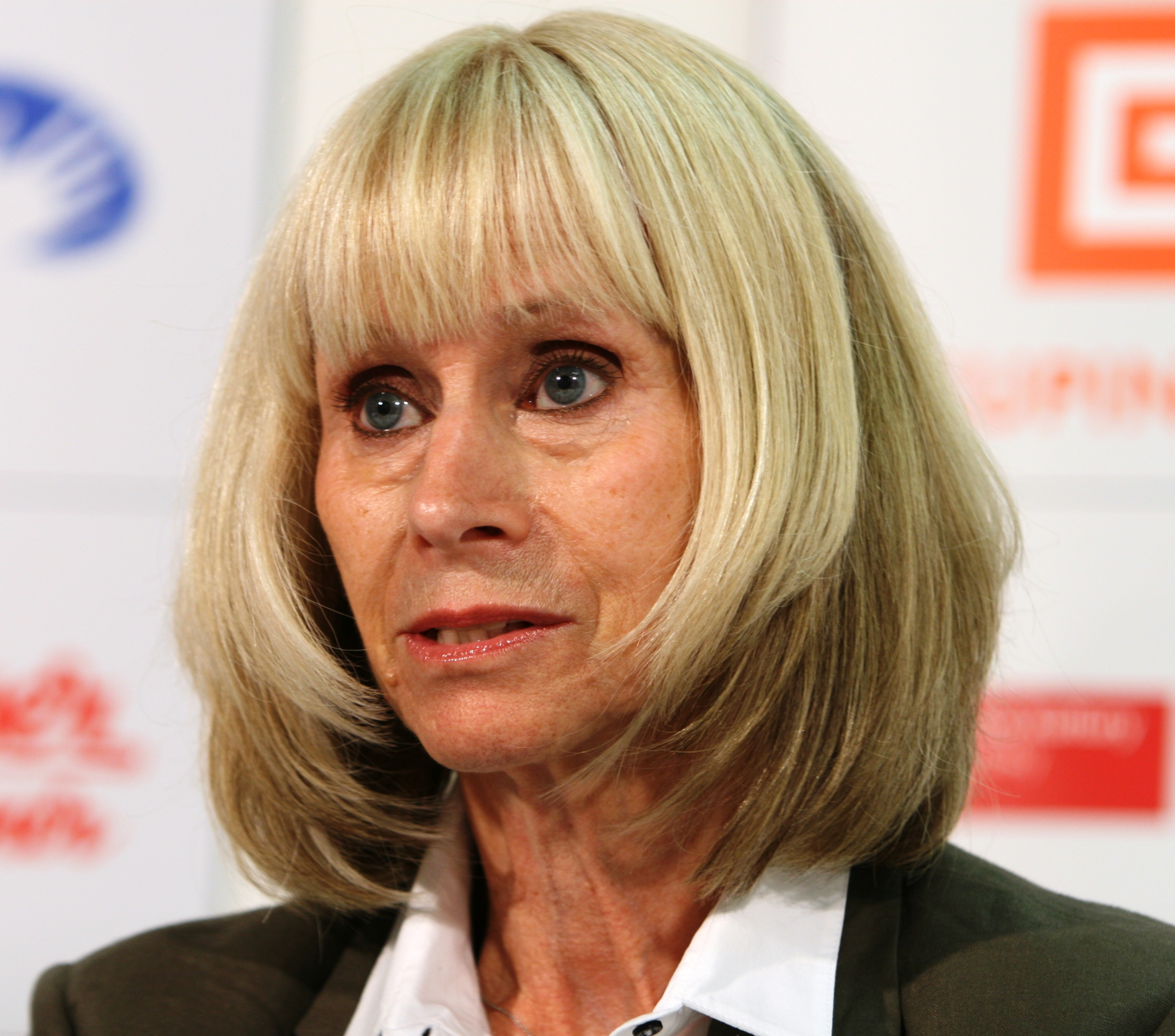
Rita Tushingham, Most Promising Newcomer to Leading Film Roles winner

=== Best Film ===
Ballad of a Soldier (TIE)
The Hustler (TIE)

- Apur Sansar
- The Hole
- The Innocents
- Judgment at Nuremberg
- The Long and the Short and the Tall
- Rocco and His Brothers
- The Sundowners
- A Taste of Honey
- Whistle Down the Wind

=== Best British Film ===
A Taste of Honey

- The Innocents
- The Long and the Short and the Tall
- The Sundowners
- Whistle Down the Wind

=== Best British Actor ===
Peter Finch in No Love for Johnnie

- Dirk Bogarde in Victim

=== Best Foreign Actor ===
Paul Newman in The Hustler

- Montgomery Clift in Judgment at Nuremberg
- Vladimir Ivashov in Ballad of a Soldier
- Philippe Leroy in The Hole
- Sidney Poitier in A Raisin in the Sun
- Maximilian Schell in Judgment at Nuremberg
- Alberto Sordi in The Best of Enemies

=== Best British Actress ===
Dora Bryan in A Taste of Honey

- Deborah Kerr in The Sundowners
- Hayley Mills in Whistle Down the Wind

=== Best Foreign Actress ===
Sophia Loren in Two Women

- Annie Girardot in Rocco and His Brothers
- Piper Laurie in The Hustler
- Claudia McNeil in A Raisin in the Sun
- Jean Seberg in Breathless

=== Best British Screenplay ===
The Day the Earth Caught Fire – Wolf Mankowitz and Val Guest (TIE)
A Taste of Honey – Tony Richardson and Shelagh Delaney (TIE)

- Flame in the Streets – Ted Willis
- The Guns of Navarone – Carl Foreman
- Victim – Janet Green and John McCormick
- Whistle Down the Wind – Keith Waterhouse and Willis Hall

=== Best Animated Film ===
One Hundred and One Dalmatians

- The Do-It-Yourself Cartoon Kit
- For Better...For Worse

=== Best Short Film ===
Terminus – John Schlesinger

- Eyes of a Child
- Let My People Go

=== United Nations Award ===
Let My People Go

- The Best of Enemies
- Take a Giant Step

=== Most Promising Newcomer to Leading Film Roles ===
Rita Tushingham in A Taste of Honey

- Anthony Hancock in The Rebel
- Murray Melvin in A Taste of Honey
