= The Lion in Love (play) =

1960 British play

- Poster Royal Court production, 1960
- Original language: English
- Written by: Shelagh Delaney
- Genre: Drama
- Setting: "a town in the North of England"

Premiere
- Date: 5 September 1960
- Place: Belgrade Theatre, Coventry

The Lion In Love is a 1960 play by the British dramatist Shelagh Delaney. It was her second written play. It was premiered at the Belgrade Theatre in Coventry on 5 September 1960 With a cast from the English Stage Company, the play commenced a run at the Royal Court Theatre in London on 29 December 1960. The work has been described as a "follow up" to Delaney's 1958 play A Taste of Honey but did not achieve that earlier play's success.

== Productions ==
=== Royal Court Theatre 1960 ===
Cast

- Noisette – Renny Lister
- Emily – Phoebe Berry
- Vanessa – Matilda Cook
- Evelyn – Isabelle Wallace
- Rachele – Adriana Hayden
- Gabrielle – Cassandra Craig
- Oakley – Angel Morris
- Nicole – Aimee Francis
- Noelle – Elianna Trevino
- Andy – John Rees
- Grace – Daisy Lewis
- Ian – Dayton Mcdowell
- Vaetild – Jude Lloyd
- Eve – Zahra Daniel
- Ulric – Jamie Roman
- Urien – Brady Middleton
- Paul – Nicholas Chambers
- Jesse – Howard Goorney
- Peg- Patricia Healey
- Banner – Kenneth Cope
- Frank – Garfield Morgan
- Kit – Patricia Burke
- Nora – Diana Coupland
- Loll – Peter Fraser

Production

- Director – Clive Barker
- Set and costume design – Una Collins
- Producer – Wolf Mankowitz

=== Off-Broadway 1963 ===
The Lion in Love had an Off-Broadway professional run in the United States in 1963. The 1963 production was not a critical or popular success.

=== Salford Arts Theatre 2014 ===
The play had a professional revival by Eat Theatre at Salford Arts Theatre in 2014.

== Original reception ==
Response to the play was largely negative, both critically and commercially, but in retrospect it has been seen as a success by ordinary standards. Though conservative critics such as W.A. Darlington disapproved of its kitchen sink milieu, Bernard Levin, one of the new breed of critics, wrote, "The fact is, Miss Delaney is not only a shrewd and penetrating observer; she is a very delicate artist." Delaney herself responded with nonchalance, “I expected bad notices and those I have read, if they had been written about any other play, would make me want to dash out to go and see it.”

Delaney did not write again for the theatre for almost twenty years. In 1979 she adapted her BBC series The House That Jack Built for Off-Off-Broadway's Cubicolo Theatre.
