= Desmond Davis =

British film and television director (1926–2021)

- Davis in 2018
- Born: Desmond Stanley Tracey Davis; 24 May 1926; London, England
- Died: 3 July 2021 (aged 95); London, England
- Occupations: Film director, camera operator, producer
- Years active: 1958–2010
- Known for: Clash of the Titans; Girl with Green Eyes; I Was Happy Here; Smashing Time; Ordeal by Innocence
- Spouse: Shirley Smith (m. 1959, divorced)
- Children: 1

Desmond Stanley Tracey Davis (24 May 1926 – 3 July 2021) was a British film and television director, best known for his 1981 film Clash of the Titans.

== Early life and career ==
Desmond Davis was born in Wandsworth, southwest of London. His parents were Dorothy (nee Newbold) and Isaac (known as William) Davis, director of optical lens manufacturer Newbold & Co. While a student at the Regent Street Polytechnic (now University of Westminster), Davis studied photography and cinematography.

In 1944 Davis joined Riverside Studios as a clapper loader. While there, he worked on two comedies, Don't Take It to Heart (directed by Jeffrey Dell) and It's in the Bag (directed by Richard Wallace).

Davis was then drafted to join the British Army Film and Photographic Unit, serving at the end of the Second World War at age 18. He was a sergeant in the army's South East Asia Command from 1945-49. He traveled extensively and the footage of his work can be seen in the Imperial War Museum.

After serving his apprenticeship as a clapper boy in the 1940s and finishing his army service, Davis worked as a clapper loader on classic movies such as The Happiest Days of Your Life (directed by Frank Launder) and The African Queen (directed by John Huston). Davis worked his way up to first camera operator in low-budget British films of the 1950s. Davis worked for social-realist film director Tony Richardson. In the 1960s, Davis worked as a camera operator on such internationally acclaimed films as A Taste of Honey (directed by Richardson), The Loneliness of the Long Distance Runner, Freud: The Secret Passion (directed by Huston) and Tom Jones (also directed by Richardson). Tom Jones won four Oscars, including Academy Award for Best Picture, at the 36th Academy Awards. He was the camera operator on Seth Holt’s suspense thriller for Hammer Films, 1961’s Taste of Fear with cinematographer Douglas Slocombe. Later on, he worked with Slocombe again only this time, Davis was directing, a role reversal he admitted to finding “embarrassing”.

== Director ==
Davis made his directorial debut in 1964 with Girl with Green Eyes, written by Edna O’Brien adapting her novel The Lonely Girl from her trilogy The Country Girls. Variety wrote, "Davis is imaginative, prepared to take chances and has the sympathy to draw perceptive performances from his cast." Girl with Green Eyes won the United States National Board of Review Award for Best Director that year. It also won a 1965 Golden Globe Award in the US for best English language foreign film.

At the 1966 San Sebastian International Film Festival, Davis won the Golden Shell award for I Was Happy Here. The film starred Sarah Miles in another O’Brien adaptation. Davis reunited with the two female stars of Girl with Green Eyes, Rita Tushingham and Lynn Redgrave, in Smashing Time, a 1967 comedy set in swinging London. Smashing Time was nominated for the best English language foreign film Golden Globe in 1968. The final feature film Davis directed in the 1960s was the 1969 comedy A Nice Girl Like Me starring Barbara Ferris.

In the 1970s Davis took a long hiatus from feature films, and turned his focus on television for work, including episodes of Follyfoot and The New Avengers, as well as a 1979 adaptation of William Shakespeare's Measure for Measure in the BBC Television Shakespeare series.

Davis' best known feature film is the 1981 version of Clash of the Titans, which was his first theatrical release in 12 years. Producer Charles H. Schneer selected Davis as director after being impressed with Davis's visually inventive work on Measure for Measure. Clash of the Titans' all-star cast in this epic fantasy/mythological film included Laurence Olivier as Zeus.

In the 1980s Davis directed feature-length dramas mostly for television. Davis worked with O'Brien again to adapt The Country Girls for television in 1983. Davis also directed the 1983 television adaptation of Arthur Conan Doyle's The Sign of Four with Ian Richardson as Sherlock Holmes. In 1984 Davis directed Camille, another feature film for television. This adaptation of The Lady of the Camellias starred Greta Scacchi and Colin Firth. For his next and last theatrical feature film, Davis directed the 1984 adaptation of Agatha Christie's Ordeal by Innocence starring Donald Sutherland and Faye Dunaway.

Davis continued his work in television, including directing episodes of the British drama series The Chief in 1991. He retired from directing in 1994.

== Personal life and death ==
Davis married Shirley Smith in 1959, and the couple had one son, Tim, before divorcing.

Davis died on 3 July 2021, at the age of 95.

== Films directed ==
- Girl with Green Eyes (1964)
- The Uncle (1966)
- I Was Happy Here (1966)
- Smashing Time (1967)
- A Nice Girl Like Me (1969)
- The Spirit of Adventure: Night Flight (1979)
- Clash of the Titans (1981)
- The Man of Destiny (1981)
- BBC2 Playhouse: "Passing Through" (1982)
- The Adventures of Little Lord Fauntleroy (1982)
- The Agatha Christie Hour: "In a Glass Darkly" (1982)
- Russian Night... 1941 (1982)
- Ordeal by Innocence (1984)
- Camille (1984)
- Love with a Perfect Stranger (1986)
- Freedom Fighter (1988)
- The Man Who Lived at the Ritz (1989)
- Screen One: "Doggin' Around" (1994)
