= Smashing Time =

1967 British film by Desmond Davis

- Film poster
- Directed by: Desmond Davis
- Written by: George Melly
- Produced by: Roy Millichip; Carlo Ponti
- Starring: Rita Tushingham; Lynn Redgrave; Michael York
- Cinematography: Manny Wynn
- Edited by: Barrie Vince
- Music by: John Addison; Skip Bifferty
- Production companies: Partisan Productions; Selmur Pictures (as Selmur Productions)
- Distributed by: Paramount Pictures
- Release date: 27 December 1967 (London)
- Running time: 96 minutes
- Country: United Kingdom
- Language: English
- Budget: $630,000
- Box office: $290,000

Smashing Time is a 1967 British satirical comedy film directed by Desmond Davis starring Rita Tushingham and Lynn Redgrave. It is a satire on the 1960s media-influenced phenomenon of Swinging London. It was written by George Melly.

== Plot ==
Brenda and Yvonne, two girls from the North of England, arrive at St Pancras railway station in London to seek fame and fortune. However, their image of the city is quickly tarnished when they realise that they cannot pay for their meals in a greasy spoon café as Brenda has been robbed of her savings by a tramp. Yvonne visits Carnaby Street in the hope of catching the eye of a trendy photographer, Tom Wabe, while Brenda has to stay behind and do the washing up. A messy scene ensues as ketchup is mistaken for washing-up liquid and everyone in the café is drenched in variously coloured liquids.

Yvonne excitedly tells Brenda that Wabe took her photo for a newspaper and paid her for it. However, when the paper drops that day, Brenda sees Yvonne has been mocked for being out of fashion, and decides to confront Wabe. She finds him at a strange party served by robots (built and introduced by Clive Sword). While she tries to curse him out, Tom attempts to charm her.

The girls get a referral from their new flatmate for hostess jobs at a night club. On their first night there, Yvonne is summoned by affluent Bobby Mome-Rath, who gets her drunk and spirits her to an apartment he keeps for one-night stands. Brenda follows them, sneaks into the apartment, and tries to sabotage the tryst, adding laxative to Bobby's drink and ensuring that his bubble bath gets out of control. Meanwhile, Bobby's building supervisor spies through a hole in the ceiling. He falls through, giving Brenda and Yvonne a chance to escape. When they return to their flat, they learn the club has sacked them.

Brenda is hired by Charlotte Brillig, a dilettante heiress, to manage her exclusive design shop called "Too Much," and is left in charge while her boss meets her ostensible main employee for lunch. When affluent hangers-on come into the shop, Brenda forces them to buy something. Although she sells a lot, Charlotte isn't pleased because nothing is left for rich customers to see. At the shop Brenda meets Tom, who asks her out to lunch. The restaurant, named Sweeny Todd's, is where Yvonne has found a job, serving pies in Nell Gwynne garb. A custard-pie fight starts at the party and spreads to the street. Yvonne is blamed for starting the pie fight and fired. In turn, when Brenda brings Yvonne to the shop, they learn Charlotte has capriciously shut the business down to go on an impulse trip to Greece, leaving both girls again out of work.

The girls watch a Candid Camera-style TV show on a television in a shop window entitled You Can't Help Laughing in which an old lady's house is demolished as a joke. When they walk back to their rooming house, they discover the program has also demolished their home as well. Yvonne, as the only name on the lease, wins a reimbursement cheque for £10,000. She decides to invest the prize money in becoming a pop star. Although the live recording of her single, "I'm So Young", is patently awful, it becomes highly polished after mixing, and Yvonne's out-of-tune voice is put in tune. It becomes a big hit and Yvonne becomes a star appearing on other programmes like Hi-Fi Court (a parody of Juke Box Jury).

Yvonne and Brenda drift apart. As Tom Wabe's new girlfriend, Brenda goes to dinner on his canal barge home and stays the night. They spend the next day taking photos and she goes on to become a top model, while Yvonne's popularity wanes. Yvonne throws a plate at the TV when she sees Brenda in an advert for a new perfume called "Direct Action".

At a glamorous and star-studded party for Yvonne at the top of the Post Office Tower, Yvonne sits alone while everyone else enjoys themselves. Brenda watches the party on CCTV and sees Tom arrive to be mobbed by adoring girls. She gatecrashes the party only to see Yvonne humiliated when she falls in her own giant cake. Brenda finds the control to the revolving restaurant and turns it to full speed, ending the party in disarray.

The girls walk away in the early morning and decide to return home. The film ends with a reprise of the song "Smashing Time".

== Cast ==
- Rita Tushingham as Brenda
- Lynn Redgrave as Yvonne
- Michael York as Tom Wabe
- Anna Quayle as Charlotte Brillig
- Irene Handl as Mrs. Gimble
- Ian Carmichael as Bobby Mome-Rath
- Jeremy Lloyd as Jeremy Tove
- Toni Palmer as Toni
- George A. Cooper as Irishman
- Peter Jones as Dominic the game show host
- Arthur Mullard as cafe boss
- Ronnie Stevens as 1st waiter
- John Clive as Sweeney Todd manager
- Mike Lennox as disc jockey
- Sydney Bromley as tramp
- David Lodge as the caretaker
- Amy Dalby as old lady whose house is demolished
- Murray Melvin as 1st exquisite
- Bruce Lacey as Clive Sword
- Cardew Robinson as custard-pie vicar
- Tomorrow as The Snarks
- Paul Danquah as 2nd exquisite
- Michael Ward as elderly shop owner
- Sam Kydd as workman in greasy spoon cafe
- Geoffrey Hughes as workman in greasy spoon cafe
- Jerold Wells as workman
- Veronica Carlson as actress at party
- Valerie Leon as Tove's secretary

== Production ==
The film reunited Redgrave, Tushingham, composer John Addison, cinematographer Manny Wynn and director Davis (a camera operator in A Taste of Honey (1961)) from Girl with Green Eyes (1964). Murray Melvin and Paul Danquah, Tushingham's co-stars in A Taste of Honey, appear in cameo roles as boutique shop customers. The popular BBC series Juke Box Jury is parodied as Hi-Fi Court, and the UK version of the hidden camera series Candid Camera is parodied as You Can't Help Laughing!

Private Eye magazine at the time referred to the Queen and Princess Margaret as, respectively, Brenda and Yvonne.

Some characters' names are borrowed from Lewis Carroll's poetry, chiefly the nonsense poem Jabberwocky: Charlotte Brillig, Tom Wabe, Mrs Gimble, Bobby Mome-Rath, Jeremy Tove, Toni Mimsy, and rock band The Snarks. The latter was played by Tomorrow, known at the time of shooting as The In Crowd, and included guitarist Steve Howe, later to be a member of Yes, who shouts "Let's do it!".

The futuristic art exhibition is held at the Jabberwock Gallery.

The theme tune was sung by Tushingham and Redgrave, who also performed several of the numbers in the film. In the 1993 BBC series Hollywood UK, about the British film industry in the 1960s, the actresses appeared in the back of a London taxi singing the theme again.

== Release ==
The film had its premiere to mark the re-opening of the refurbished Odeon Leicester Square in London on 27 December 1967. The premiere was preceded by a stage show starring Cliff Richard.

== Critical reception ==
The film performed poorly at the box office and ABC recorded a loss of $710,000.

The Monthly Film Bulletin wrote: "A clumsy attempt to create a female comedy team, with Lynn Redgrave as a brassy bully of limited intelligence tyrannising her timid and smaller friend, played by Rita Tushingham with a good deal of eye-rolling. The pair lack the timing and dead-pan humour of Laurel and Hardy, and director Desmond Davis has an enervating habit of slowing down his film in the slapstick scenes as if to make sure that the audience is responding properly. George Melly's script is equally disappointing, suggesting that Swinging London is a myth created by the mass media, but eagerly exploiting the myth it explodes. The London we see is populated largely by flower-power people, velvet-coated queers and eccentric debutantes (with the occasional tramp thrown in for comic relief). The film is in fact at its best when unequivocally parodying the world of the colour supplements. The exhibition of kinetic sculpture, the take-off of Juke Box Jury and the Tv deodorant commercial are funny if hardly subtle. But the glossy vulgarity of Smashing Time quickly becomes as irritating as the brash musical score and the discordant colours that constantly fill the screen."

Film critic Alexander Walker wrote in Hollywood England that it was a film "whose crude exploitation of [Lynn Redgrave and Rita Tushingham] once more as innocents-at-large in the big city was to show how coarse and knowing the freshness of the cinema had turned once Britain was 'swinging' and the movies had to swing with it".

Leslie Halliwell said: "Horrendous attempt to turn two unsuitable actresses into a female Laurel and Hardy; plenty of coarse vigour but no style or sympathy."

== Accolades ==
The film was nominated for a Golden Globe (Best English-Language Foreign Film) in 1968.
