= Barbara Ferris =

English actress and model (1939–2025)

- Born: Barbara Gillian Ferris; 3 October 1936; London, England
- Died: 23 May 2025 (aged 88)
- Occupations: Actress; model
- Years active: 1958–1990
- Spouse: John Quested

Barbara Gillian Ferris (3 October 1936 – 23 May 2025) was an English actress and fashion model. She appeared in a number of films and productions for television, and is possibly best remembered as Dinah, the young woman who eloped with Dave Clark in the 1965 film Catch Us If You Can. Her other roles were as diverse as the female lead in Edward Bond's controversial play Saved (1965) and a vicar's wife in the television comedy series All in Good Faith in the mid-1980s.

== Screen roles of the 1960s ==
Ferris made her earliest television appearances in her teens. In 1961, she played the part of barmaid Nona Willis in Granada's twice-weekly serial Coronation Street, and also appeared in episodes of The Cheaters (1962) and Zero One (1963) starring Nigel Patrick.

=== 1960s film roles ===
Ferris's films included the drama Term of Trial (1962) starring Laurence Olivier, A Pair of Briefs (1962), a romantic comedy set around the Inns of Court; Sparrows Can't Sing (1963) as Nellie Gooding; A Place to Go (1963) starring Rita Tushingham and Bernard Lee; Bitter Harvest (1963) with Janet Munro and John Stride; Children of the Damned (1964) starring Ian Hendry, in which a group of children brought to London by UNESCO turned out to be humans advanced by a million years; Michael Winner's The System (1964), with Oliver Reed and Julia Foster, an early "Swinging London"-style sex comedy about young loafers at a seaside resort; Catch Us If You Can (1965), which featured the rock band the Dave Clark Five and owed much to The Beatles' A Hard Day's Night the previous year; Interlude (1968), alongside Oskar Werner, John Cleese and Donald Sutherland, which film historian Leslie Halliwell described as "Intermezzo remade for the swinging London set"; and Desmond Davis's A Nice Girl Like Me (1969), in which Ferris played a young woman named Candida who kept getting pregnant ("Candida isn't much for sex but she's big on babies" as one critic put it).

== Saved ==
Ferris played the leading female role in Edward Bond's play Saved at the Royal Court Theatre in London in 1965. This was subject to censorship by the Lord Chamberlain who was instrumental in bringing a successful prosecution when the producers went ahead and staged the play without cuts before private audiences. Despite the controversial subject matter, which included a scene in which a baby was stoned to death in its pram, the case was a step towards the Lord Chamberlain's losing his censorship role under the Theatres Act 1968.

Writer and critic Bernard Levin later opined that Saved contained "extremes [of cruelty] never seen before outside the Grand Guignol, or possibly even inside", while Ferris's character was described at the time by The Daily Telegraph's critic W.A. Darlington as "a young virago with a screech that afflicts the ear-drums".

== Later roles ==
Among Ferris's later television roles were as Emilie Trampusch in The Strauss Family (1972), Elizabeth in Elizabeth Alone (1981), and Emma Lambe, the wife of a vicar played by Richard Briers, in the first two series of All in Good Faith (1985–87). She also appeared as Briers' wife, Enid Washbrook, in Michael Winner's film of Alan Ayckbourn's comedy A Chorus of Disapproval (1988). Depicting the tensions and rivalries among a provincial repertory company rehearsing The Beggar's Opera, the Washbrooks' daughter Linda was played by a young Patsy Kensit. Ferris was also in The Krays (1990), a film based on the lives of the Kray twins, who were leading figures in the criminal underworld of London's East End in the 1960s.

On stage, Ferris played the lead female role (Marion) in Terence Frisby's There's a Girl in My Soup (1966) at London's Globe Theatre opposite Donald Sinden, which for a time held the record as the longest running comedy in the West End (although by then Ferris had been succeeded in the part by Belinda Carroll). She played the leading role of Belinda in Ayckbourn's Season's Greetings, a black farce about a family Christmas which opened at the Apollo Theatre in London in 1982.

== Style ==
Ferris gave a number of well-regarded performances, but she did not become a big star. Equally, although ostensibly she fitted the stereotypical image of a mid-1960s blonde, she was never really a "starlet", a characteristic she shared with, among other actresses of a similar mould, Julie Christie and Carol White. For a while, after Catch Us If You Can, she acquired a certain "pin-up" status. The New York Times' review of A Nice Girl Like You by Roger Greenspun contained a vignette of Ferris in the late 1960s:

"Barbara Ferris is a strong-featured girl with an odd facial resemblance to Noël Coward. Despite her winsome smile, flaxen hair and peaches-and-cream complexion, she plays innocence as if it were an allegory of experience and lines of calculation enmesh the cornflowers."

== Personal life and death ==
Ferris was born in London, second of four children of Roy Ferris, a milkman who had a round in Soho and his wife Dorothy (nee Roth). Her sister was the Olympic diver Elizabeth Ferris. She married film producer John Quested in 1960. She died on 23 May 2025, at the age of 88, and was survived by her husband and three children.

== Filmography ==
=== Film ===
Year	Title	Role	Notes
1956	Five Guineas a Week	Dancer	Short film
1958	Tom Thumb	Thumbelina	Uncredited role
1962	A Pair of Briefs	Gloria Lockwood	
1962	Term of Trial	Joan	
1963	Sparrows Can't Sing	Nellie	
1963	A Place to Go	Betsy	
1963	Bitter Harvest	Violet	
1964	Children of the Damned	Susan Eliot	
1964	The System	Suzy	
1965	Catch Us If You Can	Dinah	U.S. title: Having a Wild Weekend
1968	Interlude	Sally	
1969	A Nice Girl Like Me	Candida	
1989	A Chorus of Disapproval	Enid Washbrook	
1990	The Krays	Mrs. Lawson	Final film role

=== Television ===
Year	Title	Role	Notes
1958	Rush Hour	(unknown)	Episode: "April Love"
1960	ITV Television Playhouse	Paula	Series 5; episode 46: "Night School"
1960	BBC Sunday-Night Play	The Bomsheits	Series 2; episode 6: "The Nightwalkers"
1961	Coronation Street	Nona Willis	10 episodes
1962	Brothers in Law	Mandy Mcleod	Episode 3: "Breach of Contract"
1962	The Cheaters	Gail	Series 2; episode 23: "The Back of Beyond"
1963	Zero One	Dora	Series 2; episode 12: "The Switch"
1964	The Human Jungle	Wendy	Series 2; episode 9: "Enemy Outside"
1965	A Slight Case of...	(unknown)	Episode 2: "Opium"
1972	The Strauss Family	Emilie Trampusch	Mini-series; episodes 1–4 & 6
1973	Conjugal Rights	Jenny	Mini-series; episodes 1–3
1973	Play for Today	Wife	Series 3; episode 28: "Making the Play"
1973	ITV Sunday Night Theatre	Anne	Series 5; episode 30: "Blinkers"
1973	Oranges & Lemons	June	Episode 1: "A Funny Kind of Joke"
1979	Murder at the Wedding	Anne Russell	Mini-series; episodes 1–4
1980	The ITV Play	Ethel Bartlett	Episode: "For Services Rendered"
1981	BBC2 Playhouse	Elizabeth	Series 7; episodes 21–23: "Elizabeth Alone: Parts 1–3"
1985–1987	All in Good Faith	Emma Lambe	Series 1 & 2; 12 episodes
