= List of Ghanaian women writers =

Women writers born in Ghana or whose writings are closely associated with Ghana

This is a list of women writers who were born in Ghana or whose writings are closely associated with that country.

== A ==
- Ama Ata Aidoo (1940–2023), playwright, poet, fiction writer and critic
- Ama Asantewa Diaka (born 1988), poet, fiction writer, playwright
- Mary Asabea Ashun (born 1968), novelist and educator
- Portia Arthur (born 1990), author, writer and reporter
- Ayesha Harruna Attah (born 1983), novelist

== B ==
- Adwoa Badoe, novelist
- Yaba Badoe (born 1954), novelist and filmmaker
- Elizabeth-Irene Baitie (born 1970), writer of young adult fiction
- Roseanne A. Brown (born 1995), novelist
- Margaret Busby, publisher and dramatist
- Abena Busia (born 1953), poet and academic
- Akosua Busia (born 1966), actress, novelist and screenwriter

== C ==
- Adelaide Casely-Hayford (1868–1960), short story writer and educator
- Gladys May Casely-Hayford (1901–1950), poet
- Margaret Casely-Hayford (born 1959), public figure, lawyer, law book author

== D ==
- Mabel Dove Danquah (1910–1984), short story writer and journalist
- Meri Nana-Ama Danquah (born 1967), memoirist
- Amma Darko (born 1956), novelist

== G ==
- Yaa Gyasi (born 1989), novelist
- Ruby Yayra Goka (born 1982), young adult writer

== H ==
- Afua Hirsch (born 1981), journalist

== L ==
- Lesley Lokko (born 1964), novelist, architect and academic

== M ==
- Peace Adzo Medie, novelist and academic

== O ==
- Nana Oforiatta Ayim, novelist, art historian and filmmaker
- Mercy Adoma Owusu-Nimoh (1936–2011), children's writer, publisher, educationist and politician

== S ==
- Taiye Selasi (born 1979), novelist
- Efua Sutherland (1924–1996), playwright
- Esi Sutherland-Addy, academician, writer, educationalist, and human rights activist
- Margaret Safo (1957–2014), journalist and young adult novelist [also known as Peggy Oppong]

== W ==
- Mamle Wolo, novelist, short story writer

== See also ==
- List of women writers
- List of Ghanaian writers
