= All in Good Faith =

- Genre: Sitcom
- Starring: Richard Briers; Barbara Ferris; Susan Jameson; Lydia Smith; James Campbell
- Country of origin: United Kingdom
- Original language: English
- No. of series: 3
- No. of episodes: 18 + 1 short

Production
- Running time: 30 minutes
- Production company: Thames Television

Original release
- Network: ITV
- Release: 30 December 1985 – 30 May 1988

All in Good Faith is a British sitcom that aired on ITV from 30 December 1985 to 30 May 1988. Starring Richard Briers, it was written by John Kane. All in Good Faith was made for the ITV network by Thames Television.

== Synopsis ==
The Rev Philip Lambe is vicar of All Saints Church in a typical middle England town. Each episode focusses on his role as mediator in various issues between parishioners or resolving the troubles of an individual.

== Cast ==
- Richard Briers - The Reverend Philip Lambe
- Barbara Ferris - Emma Lambe (series 1 and 2)
- Susan Jameson - Emma Lambe (series 3)
- Lydia Smith - Miranda Lambe (series 1 and 2)
- James Campbell - Peter Lambe (series 1 and 2)
- James Cossins - Major Andrews (series 1)
- Robert Bridges - Wilf (series 1)
- Frank Middlemass - Desmond Frank (series 2 and 3)
- T. P. McKenna - Oscar Randolph (series 2)
- John Woodvine - Oscar Randolph (series 3)

== Plot ==
All in Good Faith was written especially for its lead star, The Good Life actor Richard Briers. The series was his first ITV sitcom. He played the Reverend Philip Lambe who, in his middle age, decides to move from his wealthy Oxfordshire parish to one in Edendale, a fictional urban town in the Midlands. He is determined to do things in his new parish and is faced with new problems like homeless people. He is accompanied by his wife Emma, sixteen-year-old daughter Miranda and twelve-year-old son Peter.

== Episodes ==
=== Series 1 (1985-6) ===
No. overall	No. in series	Title	Original release date
1	1	"In the Beginning"	30 December 1985
2	2	"No Stone Unturned"	6 January 1986
3	3	"A Flying Visit"	13 January 1986
4	4	"The Crunch"	20 January 1986
5	5	"An Eye for an Eye"	27 January 1986
6	6	"Exodus"	3 February 1986

=== Series 2 (1987) ===
No. overall	No. in series	Title	Original release date
7	1	"Home From Home"	26 February 1987
8	2	"Manna From Heaven"	5 March 1987
9	3	"I Dreamt I Dwelt In Parish Halls"	12 March 1987
10	4	"Babes and Sucklings"	19 March 1987
11	5	"The Patience of Job"	26 March 1987
12	6	"Like Father Like Son"	2 April 1987

=== Series 3 (1988) ===
No. overall	No. in series	Title	Original release date
13	1	"Where My Caravan Has Rested"	11 April 1988
14	2	"And He Fell Among Thieves"	18 April 1988
15	3	"The Prodigal Son"	25 April 1988
16	4	"The Spirit is Willing"	9 May 1988
17	5	"Behold a Pale Rider"	16 May 1988
18	6	"False Profits"	23 May 1988

=== Special (1988) ===
- Short special as part of ITV Telethon.

No. overall	No. in series	Title	Original release date
19	1	"Special"	30 May 1988

== DVD release ==
DVD	Release date
The Complete Series 1	21 October 2013
The Complete Series 2	21 April 2014
The Complete Series 3	9 December 2024
The Complete Series 1 to 3 Box Set	9 December 2024

== Bibliography ==
- Mark Lewisohn, "Radio Times Guide to TV Comedy", BBC Worldwide Ltd, 2003
- All in Good Faith at British TV Comedy
