= A Nice Girl Like Me =

1969 British film by Desmond Davis

- Directed by: Desmond Davis
- Written by: Millard Lampell
- Based on: Marry at Leisure by Anne Piper
- Produced by: Roy Millichip
- Starring: Barbara Ferris; Harry Andrews
- Cinematography: Gilbert Taylor; Manny Wynn
- Edited by: Ralph Sheldon
- Music by: Patrick Williams
- Production company: Partisan Productions
- Distributed by: AVCO Embassy Pictures
- Release date: 23 November 1969
- Running time: 90 minutes
- Country: United Kingdom
- Language: English

A Nice Girl Like Me is a 1969 British comedy film directed by Desmond Davis and starring Barbara Ferris and Harry Andrews. It was written by Millard Lampell, based on the 1959 novel Marry at Leisure by Anne Piper.

== Plot ==
The plot revolves around a girl who lives with her shrewd aunts, goes on a trip, gets pregnant, and must lie to her aunts that the baby is not hers.

== Cast ==
- Barbara Ferris as Candida
- Harry Andrews as Savage, caretaker
- Gladys Cooper as Aunt Mary
- William Hinnant as Ed
- James Villiers as Freddie
- Joyce Carey as Aunt Celia
- Christopher Guinee as Pierre
- Fabia Drake as Miss Grimsby
- Irene Prador as Mme. Dupont
- Erik Chitty as vicar
- Totti Truman Taylor as Miss Charter
- John Serret as museum attendant
- John Clive as supermarket shopper
- Ann Lancaster as Miss Garland
- Shelagh Wilcocks as labour ward sister
- Susan Whitman as labour ward nurse
- Douglas Wilmer as postnatal clinic doctor
- Jane Kenealy as baby

== Production ==
In May 1967 Stanley Baker said he was going to produce and star in the movie alongside Hayley Mills. Filming was to begin in August.

By May 1968 the film was going to star Barbara Ferris and be directed by Desmond Davis. Ferris had enjoyed a hit on Broadway in There's a Girl in My Soup.Filming began July 1968.

It was shot on location in Paris, Venice and London around Chiswick and Hammersmith riverside. The film was originally meant to star Stanley Baker.

In July 1968 it was going to star Michael J Pollard and Barbara Ferris.

== Critical reception ==
The Monthly Film Bulletin wrote: "A saccharine story about an insufferable suburban miss with an embarrassing propensity for becoming pregnant after even the shortest trip to the Continent, cynically photographed in the softest of focus by Manny Wynn and Gil Taylor and decked out with pretty picture postcard views of London, Paris and Venice. Gladys Cooper and Joyce Carey as a pair of mildly dotty aunts and Fabia Drake as a culture-conscious schoolteacher battle gamely in the face of a cloying script and uninspired direction. And indeed it is only their playing and that of James Villiers ... and above all of the always reliable Harry Andrews as the father figure who very predictably becomes the lover of the last few minutes, which save this piece of high-toned woman's magazine nostalgia from complete, unrelieved disaster."

The Spinning Image wrote, "it was regarded at the time as a glossy exercise in marrying cinema advert visuals to a would-be daring plot about unmarried motherhood, some way away from the nineteen-sixties "issue" films and TV plays that offered audiences and commentators alike something to get their teeth into. Cathy Come Home or Up the Junction this was not. All that said, and those naysayers did have a point, funnily enough this has aged rather better than might have been expected since it conforms to the Swinging Sixties stereotype fairly comfortably; though it remained a shade artificial as an experience as a nostalgia piece it came across very well, and much of that was down to the central relationship."
