= The Strauss Family =

1972 television series

- Genre: Period drama
- Directed by: David Giles; David Reid; Peter Potter
- Starring: Eric Woofe; Stuart Wilson; Nikolas Simmonds; Tony Anholt; Anne Stallybrass; Barbara Ferris; Derek Jacobi; Christopher Benjamin
- Composer: Cyril Ornadel
- Country of origin: United Kingdom
- No. of episodes: 8

Original release
- Release: 7 November – 19 December 1972

The Strauss Family is a 1972 British Associated Television series of eight episodes, about the family of composers of that name, including Johann Strauss I and his sons Johann Strauss II, Eduard Strauss and Josef Strauss.

The series was written by Anthony Skene, David Reid and David Butler, and directed by David Giles, David Reid and Peter Potter.

Anne Stallybrass was nominated for the British Academy Television Award for Best Actress for her portrayal of Anna Strauss.

ABC broadcast The Strauss Family in the United States from 5 May to 16 June 1973.

== Episodes ==
With original date of broadcast:

1. "Anna" – 7 November 1972
2. "Emilie" – 14 November 1972
3. "Schanni" – 21 November 1972
4. "Revolution" – 28 November 1972
5. "Josef" – 5 December 1972
6. "Hetti" – 12 December 1972
7. "Lili" – 19 December 1972
8. "Adele" – 19 December 1972

== Cast ==
- Eric Woofe as Johann Strauss I
- Stuart Wilson as Johann Strauss II
- Nikolas Simmonds and Louis Selwyn as Josef Strauss
- Tony Anholt as Eduard Strauss
- Anne Stallybrass as Anna Strauss
- Barbara Ferris as Emilie Trampusch
- Georgina Hale as Lili Dietrich
- Margaret Whiting as Hetti
- Derek Jacobi as Joseph Lanner
- Jane Seymour as Karoline
- Christopher Benjamin as Dommayer
- Henri Szeps as Edi's dresser

Most of the music was performed by members of the London Symphony Orchestra, conducted by the series' musical director Cyril Ornadel, and some played by the Band of Her Majesty's Lifeguards.

== Commercial release ==
The series was released on DVD as a three-disc set in the United Kingdom by Acorn Media UK in 2007.
