= The Uncle (1966 film) =

1966 British film by Desmond Davis

- Directed by: Desmond Davis
- Screenplay by: Desmond Davis; Margaret Abrams
- Based on: The Uncle (1962 novel) by Margaret Abrams
- Starring: Rupert Davies
- Cinematography: Manny Wynn
- Edited by: Brian Smedley-Aston
- Music by: John Addison
- Distributed by: British Lion Film Corporation
- Release date: 18 July 1966 (United States)
- Running time: 87 minutes
- Country: United Kingdom
- Language: English

The Uncle is a 1966 British drama film directed by Desmond Davis and starring Rupert Davies. It was written by Davis and Margaret Abrams.

== Premise ==
Seven-year-old Gus faces trouble when his difficult seven-year-old nephew Tom arrives to spend the summer holidays with his family.

== Cast ==
- Rupert Davies as David Morton
- Brenda Bruce as Addie Morton
- Robert Duncan as Gus Morton
- Ann Lynn as Sally Morton
- Christopher Ariss as Tom
- Maurice Denham as Mr. Ream
- Helen Fraser as Mary Ream
- Barbara Leake as Emma
- John Moulder-Brown as Jamie
- Jane Ratcliffe as Susie

== Critical reception ==
Variety wrote: "Although the firm control of director Davis is evident throughout, he has been fortunate in having a cast that is entirely excellent, particularly young Robert Duncan as Gus (only a British child could look so profound at seven) ... Manny Wynn's crisp black-andwhite camerawork makes good use of the English countryside and some of the individual scenes are beautifully framed ... Other technical credits are excellent although the editing, credited to Brian Smedley-Aston, is difficult to judge, because of the post-production dissension on the handling of the film. According to one source, some short scenes have been eliminated and others have been moved about. The pre-title sequences were, supposedly, originally part of the main body of the film. As there is a tendency to cross-cut and rapidly, this could be easily believed, but the overall effect of the film is still great enough to warrant its being a very pleasant adventure for all filmgoers."

In The Radio Times Guide to Films Adrian Turner gave the film 4/5 stars, writing: "This little charmer caused controversy by being denied a release for two years, during which time the film was slightly re-edited against its director's wishes. But The Uncle is one of the cinema's most inventive and perceptive portraits of childhood. It's about a seven-year-old boy (Robert Duncan) who becomes an uncle rather suddenly. The shock of the birth catapults him into an emotional crisis, leading to isolation from his family and schoolfriends. Filmed in and around Plymouth, it's a touching story, and beautifully performed."

Leslie Halliwell wrote "Its failure to find a release got it championed by some critics, but it's essentially a thin piece of work."

The Spinning Image called the film "a little gem deserving of a wider audience."

== Release ==
The film was not picked up for distribution in the United Kingdom. It was released in the United States by Lenart Productions, premiering at the Fine Arts Theatre in Beverly Hills, California, on 18 July 1966. It was also released in France by La Pagode in 1966.
