= Meri Nana-Ama Danquah =

Ghanaian-American writer (born 1967)

- Born: 13 September 1967 (age 59); Accra, Ghana
- Citizenship: American
- Occupation: Writer
- Relatives: J. B. Danquah (maternal grandfather); Paul Danquah (uncle)
- Writing career
- Notable work: Willow Weep for Me: A Black Woman’s Journey Through Depression (1998)

Meri Nana-Ama Danquah (born 13 September 1967) is a Ghanaian-American writer, editor, journalist and public speaker, whose name at birth was Mildred Mary Nana-Ama Boakyewaa Brobby. She is best known for her 1998 memoir Willow Weep for Me: A Black Woman's Journey Through Depression. Her short story "When a Man Loves a Woman" was shortlisted for the 2022 AKO Caine Prize for African Writing.

== Life ==
Danquah was born in Accra, Ghana, to Josephine Nana Korantemaa Danquah and Norbert Duke Brobby. Her maternal grandfather is Dr J. B. Danquah, a writer and prominent Ghanaian political figure, and she was the niece of actor Paul Danquah, about whom she has written in The Washington Post. Her family, the Ofori-Attas, are one of West Africa's most prominent dynasties.

Danquah moved to the United States at six years of age to live with her mother, who had migrated there three years earlier to attend Howard University. Her parents divorced six years later, separating when Danquah was aged 11. While attending Foxcroft, an all-girls' boarding school located in Middleburg, Virginia, Danquah decided to change her name from Mildred Brobby to Meri Danquah. After dropping out of the University of Maryland, she eventually moved to Los Angeles at the age of 20.

Danquah gave birth to her daughter in 1991, and they lived with Danquah's then-boyfriend and the father of her daughter. After filing for a restraining order from her daughter's father on the basis of domestic violence, Danquah and her daughter moved back to Washington D.C., where her parents and sister still lived. While in D.C., Danquah recognized that she suffered from clinical depression, an illness that would become the basis for her memoir Willow Weep for Me: A Black Woman’s Journey Through Depression, which was published in 1998 to critical praise. Excerpts from the book were published in the anthology Out of Her Mind: Women Writing on Madness. Danquah was chosen by the National Mental Health Association as spokesperson for their Campaign on Clinical Depression, which initiative specifically targeted African-American women.

In 1999, Danquah earned her Master of Fine Arts degree in Creative Writing and Literature, concentrating on Creative Nonfiction, from Bennington College, despite never completing an undergraduate degree. She has taught at the University of Ghana, at Otis College of Art and Design, and in Antioch College's MFA program, and is sought after as a speaker and lecturer.

She has also edited anthologies of writing by women, including Shaking the Tree: A Collection of New Fiction and Memoir by Black Women (2003), about which Maya Angelou said in a cover quote: "Ms. Danquah has indeed shaken a literary tree. The fruit that fell down will nourish readers for a long time...."

In 2011, Danquah announced that she was working on a novel. She has written articles and columns in publications including The Washington Post, The Village Voice, The Los Angeles Times, Allure, Essence, The Africa Report and The Daily Graphic. She is senior editor of African literature and culture at the Los Angeles Review of Books.

She is a contributor to the 2019 anthology New Daughters of Africa, edited by Margaret Busby, with the memoir "Saying Goodbye to Mary Danquah".

In June 2022, her story "When a Man Loves a Woman", originally published in Accra Noir, was announced on the shortlist of the Caine Prize for African Writing, and was described in Brittle Paper by Doreen Baingana as "a fascinating study of the dangers, satisfactions and mysteries of love".

== Bibliography ==
=== As author ===
- Willow Weep for Me: A Black Woman’s Journey Through Depression, W. W. Norton & Company, 1998, ISBN 9780393045673

=== As editor ===
- Shaking the Tree: A Collection of New Fiction and Memoir by Black Women, W. W. Norton, 2003, ISBN 978-0393050677
- The Black Body, Seven Stories Press, 2009, ISBN 978-1583228890
- Becoming American: Personal Essays by First Generation Immigrant Women, Hyperion Books, 2000, ISBN 978-0786865895
- American Woman: Personal Essays by First Generation Immigrant Women (Expanded Second Edition), Seven Stories Press, 2012, ISBN 978-1609804084
- Accra Noir, Akashic Books, 2020, ISBN 9781617758898

=== Selected essays and articles ===
- "Life as an Alien", in O'Hearn, Claudine Chiawei (ed.), Half and Half: Writers on Growing Up Biracial and Bicultural (Pantheon Books, 1998), The Washington Post, 17 May 1998.
- "What I Learned From My Auntie Maya", Wall Street Journal, 28 May 2014.
- "A Different Breed" (memoir excerpt), Kweli, 9 August 2014.
- "Afro-Kinky Human Hair", in: Everything But The Burden: What White People Are Taking From Black Culture, edited by Greg Tate, 2003, New York: Harlem Moon Broadway Books, ISBN 978-0-7679-1497-0
- "Saying Goodbye to Mary Danquah", in New Daughters of Africa, edited by Margaret Busby, 2019. London: Myriad Editions; New York: Amistad Press.
- "When A Man Loves A Woman", Accra Noir, 2020.

== See also ==
- List of African-American writers
- List of Ghanaian women writers
