= John Addison =

English composer (1920–1998)

- Addison in 1953.

Background information
- Born: John Mervyn Addison; 16 March 1920; Chobham, Surrey, England
- Died: 7 December 1998 (aged 78) Bennington, Vermont, U.S.
- Occupation: Composer

John Mervyn Addison (16 March 1920 – 7 December 1998) was a British composer best known for his film scores.

== Early life ==
Addison was born in Chobham, Surrey to a father who was a colonel in the Royal Field Artillery, and this influenced the decision to send him to school at Wellington College, Berkshire. His grandfather was Lieut-Colonel George Addison, who played for the Royal Engineers in the 1872 and 1874 FA Cup Finals.

At the age of sixteen he entered the Royal College of Music, where he studied composition with Gordon Jacob, oboe with Léon Goossens, and clarinet with Frederick Thurston. This education ended in 1939 with service in World War II. Addison served with the British XXX Corps in the 23rd Hussars. He was a tank officer in the Battle of Normandy and wounded at Caen, later participating in Operation Market Garden. Addison would later write the score for the film A Bridge Too Far about the operation. At the end of the war, he returned to London to teach composition at the Royal College of Music.

== Career ==
Addison is best known for his film scores. He won an Academy Award for Best Original Score and a Grammy Award in the Best Original Score from a Motion Picture or Television Show category for the music to the 1963 film, Tom Jones. He also won a BAFTA Award for A Bridge Too Far (1977). His other film scores included A Taste of Honey (1961), Smashing Time (1967), The Honey Pot (1967), Sleuth (1972), Swashbuckler (1976) and the television series Centennial (1978).

He composed the theme music for the television series Murder, She Wrote, and won an Emmy for the 2-hour pilot episode in the Outstanding Achievement in Music Composition for a Series (dramatic underscore) category. Addison was the composer Alfred Hitchcock turned to when the director ended his long relationship with Bernard Herrmann over the score to his 1966 film Torn Curtain, although Addison was not hired for any of his other films.

He had a personal connection to Reach for the Sky (1956) which he scored, since Douglas Bader (the subject of the movie) was his brother-in-law, having married Addison's elder sister Thelma.

For the theatre, Addison wrote the music for John Osborne's plays The Entertainer (1957) and Luther (1961). He collaborated with John Cranko on a revue, "Cranks" in 1956.

Although he wrote numerous classical compositions, Addison explained that "If you find you're good at something, as I was as a film composer, it's stupid to do anything else." His classical works included the Concerto for trumpet, strings and percussion (1949), described by The Times as "buoyant" and "Gershwinesque"; a trio for oboe, clarinet and bassoon; Carte Blanche, a ballet for Sadler's Wells first performed at the 1953 Edinburgh Festival from which an orchestral suite of "sophisticated high spirits" was performed at the Proms; a sextet for wind and harp, a piano concertino, a concertante for oboe, clarinet, horn and orchestra; and a partita for strings, which was warmly praised. The Bassoon Concertino was one of his last compositions. It was premiered by Graham Salvage and the Hallé Orchestra on 4 July 1998 at the BBC Proms he died later that year in Vermont at 78.

Marlene Dietrich recorded If He Swing By the String and Such Trying Times from the music in Tom Jones.

Addison's collection of correspondence, scores, and studio recordings were donated to the Film Music Archives at Brigham Young University in 1994. He was survived by his wife Pamela; two sons Jonathan and Daniel; daughter Lucinda; stepson Rex Birchenough, and stepdaughter Sandra Stapleton. His daughter Jane pre-deceased him.

== Film scores ==
- 1950: Seven Days to Noon
- 1951: High Treason
- 1951: Pool of London
- 1952: The Hour of 13
- 1953: The Man Between
- 1953: Terror on a Train
- 1953: The Red Beret
- 1954: The Maggie
- 1954: The Black Knight
- 1954: Make Me an Offer
- 1955: The Cockleshell Heroes
- 1956: Private's Progress
- 1956: Reach for the Sky
- 1956: Three Men in a Boat
- 1957: The Shiralee
- 1957: Lucky Jim
- 1957: Barnacle Bill
- 1958: I Was Monty's Double
- 1959: Carlton-Browne of the F.O.
- 1960: School for Scoundrels
- 1960: The Entertainer
- 1960: A French Mistress
- 1960: His and Hers
- 1961: A Taste of Honey
- 1962: Go to Blazes
- 1962: The Loneliness of the Long Distance Runner
- 1963: Girl in the Headlines
- 1963: Tom Jones
- 1964: Girl with Green Eyes
- 1964: Guns at Batasi
- 1964: The Peaches
- 1965: The Amorous Adventures of Moll Flanders
- 1965: The Loved One
- 1966: The Uncle
- 1966: I Was Happy Here
- 1966: A Fine Madness
- 1966: Torn Curtain
- 1967: The Honey Pot
- 1967: Smashing Time
- 1968: The Charge of the Light Brigade
- 1970: Start the Revolution Without Me
- 1970: Country Dance
- 1971: Mr. Forbush and the Penguins
- 1972: Sleuth
- 1973: Luther
- 1974: Dead Cert
- 1975: Ride a Wild Pony
- 1976: Swashbuckler
- 1976: The Seven-Per-Cent Solution
- 1977: A Bridge Too Far
- 1977: Joseph Andrews
- 1980: The Pilot
- 1982: Highpoint
- 1983: Strange Invaders
- 1985: Grace Quigley
- 1985: Code Name: Emerald

== Music composed for TV ==
- 1964: Detective (1 episode)
- 1970: ITV Sunday Night Theatre (1 episode: Hamlet)
- 1974: Play for Today (1 episode)
- 1974: Bellamira
- 1975: A Journey to London
- 1975: Grady (2 episodes)
- 1978: Black Beauty
- 1978: The Bastard
- 1978: The Eddie Capra Mysteries (1 episode)
- 1978: Pearl
- 1978: Centennial (12 episodes)
- 1979: Like Normal People
- 1979: The Power Within
- 1979: Love's Savage Fury
- 1979: The French Atlantic Affair
- 1981: Nero Wolfe (14 episodes)
- 1981: Mistress of Paradise
- 1982: Eleanor, First Lady of the World
- 1982: Charles & Diana: A Royal Love Story
- 1982: The Devlin Connection
- 1982: I Was a Mail Order Bride
- 1984: Murder, She Wrote (1 episode)
- 1984: Ellis Island
- 1985: Thirteen at Dinner
- 1986: Dead Man's Folly
- 1986: Something in Common
- 1986: Amazing Stories (2 episodes)
- 1986–1987: Walt Disney's Wonderful World of Color (2 episodes)
- 1987: Strange Voices
- 1988: A Shadow on the Sun
- 1990: The Phantom of the Opera (miniseries)

== Concert works ==
- Trio for harp, flute and violin (1941)
- Variations for piano and orchestra (1948)
- Concerto for trumpet, strings and percussion (1949)
- Wind Sextet (1949)
- Trio for oboe, clarinet and bassoon (1952)
- Carte Blanche, ballet (1953)
- Divertimento, op. 9 for brass quartet
- Concert Overture, op. 13 (1955)
- Serenade for wind quintet and harp (1957)
- Conversation Piece for chamber ensemble (1958)
- Concertante for oboe, clarinet, horn and orchestra (1959)
- Wellington Suite for 2 horns, piano, strings and percussion (1959)
- Concertino for piano (1959)
- Partita for strings (1961)
- Display for orchestra (1968)
- Divertimento for wind quintet (1990)
- Bennington Suite for flute, violin, viola and cello
- Concertino for orchestra (1993)
- Bassoon Concertino (1998)

== See also ==
- List of Academy Award winners and nominees from Great Britain
