= Ordeal by Innocence (film) =

1984 film by Desmond Davis

- Directed by: Desmond Davis
- Written by: Agatha Christie (novel); Alexander Stuart (screenplay)
- Starring: Donald Sutherland; Sarah Miles; Christopher Plummer; Ian McShane; Diana Quick; Faye Dunaway
- Cinematography: Billy Williams
- Edited by: Timothy Gee
- Music by: Dave Brubeck
- Distributed by: Cannon Films
- Release date: 22 June 1984; (Mystfest in Italy)
- Running time: 90 minutes
- Country: United Kingdom
- Language: English

Ordeal by Innocence is a 1984 British mystery film directed by Desmond Davis. It stars Donald Sutherland, Faye Dunaway, Christopher Plummer and Sarah Miles. It is based on the 1958 Agatha Christie novel Ordeal by Innocence.

== Plot ==
Paleontologist Dr. Arthur Calgary visits the Argyle family to give them an address book that belongs to Jack Argyle. He is told that Jack was executed for the murder of his adoptive mother two years previously. Dr. Calgary can prove that Jack was innocent and restarts the investigation, with lethal consequences.

== Cast ==
- Donald Sutherland as Dr. Arthur Calgary
- Faye Dunaway as Rachel Argyle
- Christopher Plummer as Leo Argyle
- Sarah Miles as Mary Durrant
- Ian McShane as Philip Durrant
- Diana Quick as Gwenda Vaughan
- Annette Crosbie as Kirsten Lindstrom
- Michael Elphick as Inspector Huish
- George Innes as Archie Leach
- Valerie Whittington as Hester Argyle
- Phoebe Nicholls as Tina Argyle
- Michael Maloney as Micky Argyle
- Cassie Stuart as Maureen Clegg
- Anita Carey as Martha Jessup
- Billy McColl as Jacko Argyle
- Ron Pember as Ferryman
- Kevin Stoney as Solicitor
- Brian Glover as Executioner

== Release ==
The film was shown at Italy's Mystfest on 22 June 1984.

== Sound design and music ==
The film's musical score by Dave Brubeck was criticized as inappropriate for its style depicting the mystery film genre. Brubeck, an American jazz legend, was not-well-known for his work as a film composer and had taken over from Pino Donaggio, who had already composed many pieces for the project. Donaggio was too busy in order to work on finalizing the film score when various film edits needed re-scoring, and so the project was handed over to Brubeck, who was given two weeks to complete the task. Donaggio's original score had swirling strings, lush melodies, and tension-filled passages, whereas Brubeck's score relied on re-recordings of his previous compositions, criticized for not resembling movie music and was assessed to be mostly at odds with the visuals and mood of the film.

== Reviews ==
A timeout.com review stated "the film succeeds admirably in catching a feeling of repression and social conformity, and the idea of murder as a means of maintaining respectability rather than for gain or passion" and "a genuine '50s black thriller".
