= Mercy Adoma Owusu-Nimoh =

Ghanaian writer

Mercy Adoma Owusu-Nimoh (6 February 1936 – 14 February 2011) was a Ghanaian children's writer, publisher, educationist and politician. She was the recipient of a Noma Award honourable mention in 1980 for The Walking Calabash.

== Life and career ==
Owusu-Nimoh was a Ghanaian author and also the founder-proprietor of Ama Nipaa Memorial Preparatory and Junior Secondary School in Kade, Ghana. In the 1996 parliamentary elections she stood as the National Democratic Congress (NDC) candidate in Kade, coming second with 37.9% of the vote.

== Death ==
Owusu-Nimoh died on 14 February 2011, at the age of 75.

== Works ==
- Rivers of Ghana, 1979
- Kofizee Goes to School, 1978
- The Walking Calabash and Other Stories, 1977
- Mosquito Town, 1966
- Tiko and Bosi, 1984
