= A Taste of Honey =

British 1958 play by Shelagh Delaney

- "Methuen's Modern Plays" 1959 paperback front cover
- Original language: English
- Characters: Helen; Josephine; Peter; The Boy; Geoffrey
- Genre: Drama
- Setting: Manchester

Premiere
- Date: 27 May 1958
- Place: Theatre Workshop

A Taste of Honey is the first play by the English playwright and screenwriter Shelagh Delaney, written when she was 19. The play had its premiere in 1958, and was subsequently adapted into the 1961 film of the same title which won four BAFTAs at the 15th British Academy Film Awards.

Set in Salford in North West England, it tells the story of Jo, a working class schoolgirl, and her mother, Helen, who is presented as tarty, foul mouthed and promiscuous. Helen leaves Jo alone in their new flat after Helen begins a relationship with Peter, a flashy, moneyed "wide boy" who is younger than her. At the same time Jo, who is white, begins a romantic relationship with Jimmy, a black sailor. Despite being only 15, she tells him she is nearly 18 and therefore nearly old enough to marry without parental permission. He proposes marriage but then goes to sea, leaving Jo pregnant and alone. She finds lodgings with a gay acquaintance, Geoffrey, who assumes the role of surrogate father. Helen returns after leaving her lover and the future of Jo's new home is put into question.

A Taste of Honey was originally intended as a novel, but Delaney turned it into a play because she hoped to revitalise British theatre and address social issues that she thought were not being presented. The play was produced by Joan Littlewood's Theatre Workshop and premiered at the Theatre Royal Stratford East, a socialist fringe theatre in London, on 27 May 1958. It starred Frances Cuka as Jo and Avis Bunnage as her mother. The production then transferred to Wyndham's Theatre in the West End on 10 February 1959.

A Taste of Honey comments on, and puts into question, class, race, age of sexual consent, gender, sexual orientation and illegitimacy in mid-twentieth-century Britain. It became known as a "kitchen sink" play, part of a genre revolutionising British theatre at the time.

== Plot ==
=== Act 1 ===
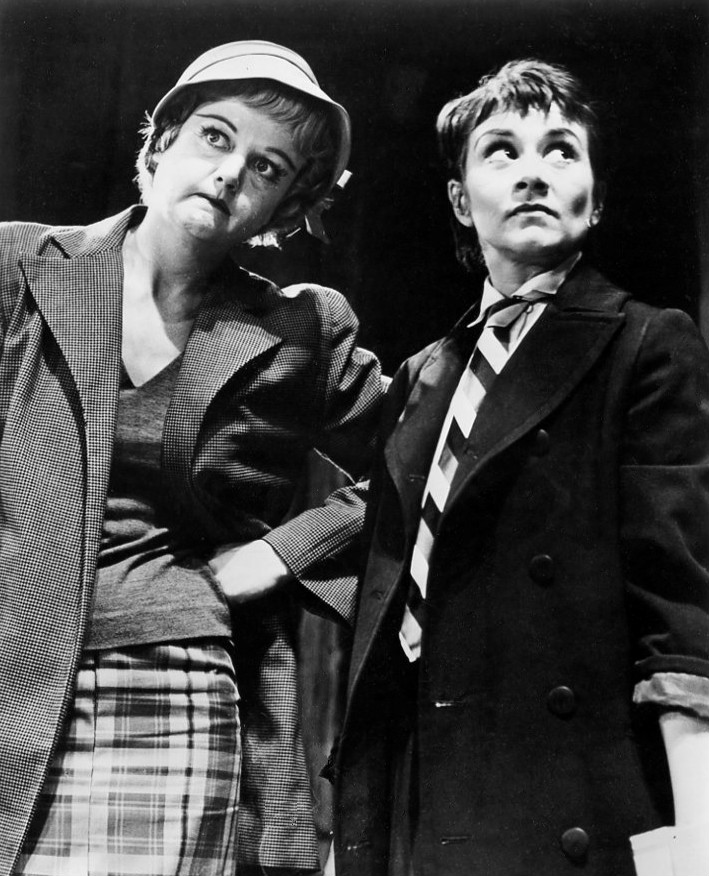
Angela Lansbury (left) as Helen with Joan Plowright (right) as Jo in the original Broadway production of A Taste of Honey

In the first scene, Helen and her teenage daughter Jo are moving into a shabby flat. Within a few minutes, the audience learns that they have little money, living off Helen's immoral earnings—money given to her by her lovers; she is not a true prostitute, being more of a "good time girl." Helen is a regular drinker, and she and Jo have a confrontational and ambiguously interdependent relationship. As they settle, Helen's surprise at some of Jo's drawings both suggests Jo's talent and originality and shows Helen's lack of interest and knowledge about her daughter. Jo rejects the idea of going to an art school, blaming Helen for having interrupted her training all too often by moving her constantly from one school to another. Jo now only wants to leave school and earn her own money so that she can get away from Helen. After this conversation, Peter (Helen's younger boyfriend) comes in. Jo assumes that Helen has moved here to escape from him, but the audience is never told the reason. Peter had not realised how old Helen was until he sees her daughter. Nonetheless he asks Helen to marry him, first half-jokingly, then more or less in earnest.

In the next scene, Jo is walking home in the company of her black boyfriend. During a light-hearted, semi-serious dialogue, he asks her to marry him, and she agrees, but he is in the navy and will be away on his ship for six months before they can marry. He gives Jo a ring that she hangs around her neck under her clothes to hide it from Helen. Jo tells him that she is really leaving school and that she is going to start a part-time job in a pub.

At the flat, Helen informs Jo that she is going to marry Peter. Peter enters, and a dialogue ensues among the three. Instead of only Jo and Helen attacking each other, a more complex pattern evolves: Jo attacks the others, the others attack Jo, and Helen attacks both Peter and Jo. Jo is truly upset at the thought of Helen marrying Peter, but pesters and provokes him in an effort to antagonise him. After Helen and Peter leave her on her own for Christmas, Jo weeps, and she is consoled by her boyfriend. She invites him to stay over Christmas, but she has a feeling that she never will see him again.

The action moves to the occasion of Helen's wedding, the day after Christmas. Jo has a cold and will not be able to attend at the wedding. Because she is in her pyjamas, Helen catches a glimpse of the ring around her neck and learns the truth. She scolds Jo violently for thinking of marrying so young, one of her occasional bursts of real feeling and concern for her daughter. Asked by Jo about her real father, Helen explains that she had been married to a "Puritan" and that she had to look elsewhere for sexual pleasure. Thus she had her first sexual experience with Jo's father, a "not very bright man," a "bit retarded". She then hurries off to her wedding.

=== Act 2 ===
Several months later, Jo is living alone in the same shabby flat. She works in a shoe shop by day and in a bar in the evenings to afford the rent. She is pregnant, and her boyfriend has not come back to her. She returns from a funfair to the flat in the company of Geoff, an art student, who has possibly been thrown out from his former lodgings because his landlady suspected he was gay. Jo offends him with insensitive questions about his sexuality, and he in turn maliciously criticises her drawings. She apologises and asks him to stay, sleeping on the couch. Geoff develops genuine concern for Jo's situation, and they develop a friendly, light-hearted relationship.

The audience next sees Jo irritable and depressed by her pregnancy, with Geoff patiently consoling her. Then, seeking reassurance, he kisses her and asks her to marry him. Jo says that, although she likes him, she cannot marry him. She makes a sexual pass at him which he fails to recognise, confirming that "it is not marrying love between us". At this point, Helen enters. She has been contacted by Geoff, who wishes to keep this fact secret from Jo.

Jo, however, guesses as much, and she is angry with both Helen and Geoff. Geoff tries to interfere in the quarrel between the two women, but each time, he is attacked by one or the other or both. As Helen is offering Jo money, Peter comes in, very drunk, and takes back the money and Helen's offer of a home to Jo. He leaves, insisting that Helen come with him; after a moment's hesitation, she runs after him.

In the next scene, the baby is due at any moment. Jo and Geoff seem happy. He reassures her that Helen was probably mistaken about or exaggerating the mental deficiencies of Jo's father. Geoff has bought a doll for Jo to practise handling the baby, but Jo flings it to the ground because it is the wrong colour: Jo assumes that her baby will be as black as its father. Her momentary outburst against the baby, motherhood and womanhood is short-lived, and she and Geoff are about to have tea when Helen enters with all her luggage. Apparently, she has been thrown out by Peter and now plans to move in with her daughter. To get rid of Geoff, she behaves rudely to him while overwhelming Jo with advice and presents. Jo defends Geoff, but while she is asleep, Geoff decides to leave because Helen is determined and he does not want Jo to be pulled between them. Jo wakes, and Helen pretends that Geoff is out doing the shopping. When her mother learns that the baby will be black, she loses her nerve and rushes out for a drink, even though Jo's labour pains have begun. Alone, Jo comforts herself by humming a tune Geoff used to sing, still not realising that he has in fact gone.

== Characters ==
- Helen: A hardened, working-class, single mother and alcoholic
- Josephine, her teenage daughter, known as Jo, raised solely by Helen
- Peter: Helen's younger, wealthy boyfriend from London
- The Boy: Also known as Jimmy, a black sailor, with whom Jo falls in love and becomes pregnant
- Geoffrey: An art student in his early 20s who becomes Jo's flatmate and friend

== Productions ==
=== Original cast and crew (1958, London) ===
- Helen – Avis Bunnage
- Josephine – Frances Cuka
- Peter – Nigel Davenport
- The Boy – Clifton Jones
- Geoffrey – Murray Melvin
- The Apex Jazz Trio – Johnny Wallbank (cornet), Barry Wright (guitar), Christopher Capon (double bass)
- Setting by John Bury
- Costumes by Una Collins

=== Broadway cast (1960) ===
- Helen – Angela Lansbury
- Josephine – Joan Plowright
- Peter – Nigel Davenport
- The Boy – Billy Dee Williams
- Geoffrey – Andrew Ray

=== TV Mini Series (1971) ===
- Helen – Diana Dors
- Josephine – Rosalind Elliot
- Peter – Barry Foster
- The Boy – Loftus Burton
- Geoffrey – David Dixon

=== Broadway revival cast (1981) ===
- Helen – Valerie French
- Josephine – Amanda Plummer
- Peter – John Carroll
- The Boy – Tom Wright
- Geoffrey – Keith Reddin

=== Watford Palace cast (UK)(2000) ===
- Helen - Gemma Craven
- Jo - Kaye Wragg
- Peter - Patrick Baladi
- The Boy - Mark Springer
- Geoffrey - Ashley Artus

=== Adaptation for BBC Radio 3 cast (2004) ===
- Helen – Siobhan Finneran
- Jo – Beth Squires
- Peter – Charles Lawson
- The Boy – Richard Mylan
- Geoffrey – Andrew Sheridan

=== UK Touring Production 2006 ===
- Helen – Samantha Giles
- Josephine – Samantha Robinson
- Peter – Andonis Anthony
- Jimmy – Chris Jack
- Geoffrey – Bruno Langley

=== Royal Exchange Theatre Manchester, 2008 ===
- Helen – Sally Lindsay
- Josephine – Jodie McNee
- Peter – Paul Popplewell
- Jimmy – Marcel McCalla
- Geoffrey – Adam Gillen

=== Royal Exchange Theatre Manchester, 2024 ===
- Helen – Jill Halfpenny
- Jo – Rowan Robinson
- Peter – Andrew Sheridan
- Jimmy – Obadiah
- Geoffrey – David Moorst

=== Royal National Theatre 2014 ===
- Helen – Lesley Sharp
- Jo – Kate O'Flynn
- Jimmy – Eric Kofi Abrefa
- Peter – Dean Lennox Kelly
- Geoffrey – Harry Hepple

=== Belvoir Theatre, Sydney 2018 ===
- Helen – Genevieve Lemon
- Jo – Taylor Ferguson
- Jimmy – Thuso Lekwape
- Peter – Josh McConville
- Geoffrey – Tom Anson Mesker

=== BBC Schools Productions ===
- 1970. Diana Dors as Helen and Barry Foster as Peter.
- 1984. Jane Freeman as Helen, Peter Egan as Peter and Sara Sugarman as Jo.

== Reception ==
Writing of the original production, Milton Shulman in the Evening Standard found the play immature and unconvincing, and others were similarly derogatory about the author's age, with the Daily Mail writing that it tasted not of honey, but "of exercise books and marmalade." However, Kenneth Tynan wrote "Miss Delaney brings real people on to her stage, joking and flaring and scuffling and, eventually, out of the zest for life she gives them, surviving” ; while Lindsay Anderson in Encore called the play "a work of complete, exhilarating originality," giving "a real escape from the middlebrow, middle-class vacuum of the West End."

By way of a visual backdrop to A Taste of Honey, Delaney reflected on life in Salford in a documentary, directed by Ken Russell, for BBC television's Monitor that was broadcast on 26 September 1960.

== Popular references ==
The play was admired by Morrissey of the band the Smiths, who used photos of Delaney on the cover artwork for their album Louder Than Bombs and single "Girlfriend in a Coma" (both 1987). An early song of theirs, "This Night Has Opened My Eyes" (1984), is based on the play and includes a paraphrase of Geoffrey's line to Jo near the end: "The dream has gone but the baby is real." Morrissey's lyrics include other borrowings from Delaney, such as "river the colour of lead" and "I'm not happy and I'm not sad", both of which are spoken by the lead character Jo. Other quotations and near-quotations appear in several other songs by the Smiths and Morrissey.

The play is referred to by Akira the Don in the title track on the album Thieving (2008), in which it appears to awaken him to literature in a school English lesson.

It appears in On Chesil Beach by Ian McEwan as a film watched by the main characters.

== Awards and nominations ==
=== Original Broadway production ===
Year	Award	Category	Nominee	Result
1961	Tony Award	Best Actress in a Play	Joan Plowright	Won

=== 1981 Broadway revival ===
Year	Award	Category	Nominee	Result
1982	Tony Award	Best Revival		Nominated
1982	Tony Award	Best Actress in a Play	Amanda Plummer	Nominated
1982	Drama Desk Award	Outstanding Actress in a Play	Amanda Plummer	Won
1982	Theatre World Award		Amanda Plummer	Won

== See also ==
- Theatre of the United Kingdom
- English drama
- Delaney, Shelagh. A Taste of Honey. Methuen Student Edition with commentary and notes. London: Methuen Publishing, 1982.
