= A Taste of Honey (film) =

1961 British film by Tony Richardson

- UK release window card
- Directed by: Tony Richardson
- Screenplay by: Shelagh Delaney; Tony Richardson
- Based on: A Taste of Honey; 1958 play by Shelagh Delaney
- Produced by: Tony Richardson
- Starring: Rita Tushingham; Dora Bryan; Robert Stephens; Murray Melvin; Paul Danquah
- Cinematography: Walter Lassally
- Edited by: Antony Gibbs
- Music by: John Addison
- Production company: Woodfall Film Productions
- Distributed by: British Lion Films
- Release date: 14 September 1961
- Running time: 100 minutes
- Country: United Kingdom
- Budget: £121,602

A Taste of Honey is a 1961 British New Wave drama film directed by Tony Richardson and starring Rita Tushingham, Dora Bryan, Robert Stephens and Murray Melvin. It is an adaptation of the 1958 play of the same name by Shelagh Delaney. Delaney wrote the screenplay with Richardson, who had directed the original Broadway production of the play in 1960. As with the play, the film is an exemplar of a social realist genre of British cultural movement known as kitchen sink realism.

== Plot ==
In Salford, 17-year-old Josephine (who goes by "Jo"), struggles through an outdoor game of netball in gym class at her all-girls school. When she gets home, she hears her self-centred mother, Helen, arguing with their landlady, who is upset about overdue rent and Helen's frequent gentlemen visitors. Once the landlady leaves, Jo and Helen sneak out the window and move across town on a bus, which is apparently not a unique occurrence for the pair.

When Jo and Helen arrive at their shabby new flat, Jimmy, a young black sailor, sees Jo struggling with her suitcases and comes to her aid. Later that evening, Helen brings her new boyfriend, Peter, home after a night in the pub, but Peter leaves after realizing that Helen is a mother. Helen and Jo go to sleep in the bed they share.

After being kept after class for mocking her teacher, Jo trips and scrapes her knee as she is walking home. She limps past the Manchester Ship Canal, where Jimmy happens to be disembarking the ship on which he works as a cook. He invites her aboard to attend to her knee. They begin a brief courtship, and Jimmy gives Jo an engagement ring that she wears on a ribbon around her neck.

Jo joins Helen and Peter on a weekend trip to Blackpool with friends. Peter gives Helen an ultimatum, saying she must choose between him and her daughter; Helen sends Jo home alone. Jimmy is waiting when Jo arrives in Salford, and they spend the night together. In the morning, Jo watches him board his ship and depart. Helen returns just long enough to pack before leaving to get married and go on a honeymoon, after which she intends to live in a suburban bungalow with Peter.

Left to fend for herself, Jo leaves school, gets a job in a shoe shop, and moves into a loft apartment in a former workshop. She meets Geoffrey Ingham, a gay textile design student, and invites him to live with her after learning he has been evicted due to his sexuality.

Jo discovers she is pregnant by Jimmy. Geoff offers to marry her; she declines, though she does let him take care of her. After Jo has an outburst during which she says she does not want to be either a mother or a woman, Geoff tracks down Helen. Helen comes to visit Jo, and they almost immediately have a row. An inebriated Peter enters, takes back some money Helen offered Jo, and states that Jo will not be allowed to move into his house. Before they leave, Helen offers stay with Jo, but Jo refuses; once alone, Peter gives Helen the same ultimatum as in Blackpool, and she again chooses him.

On Guy Fawkes Night, with Jo's due date fast approaching, Helen reappears. Her marriage to Peter has fallen apart, and she is intent on moving in with Jo and pushing out Geoff, with whom she has a shouting match. Although Jo says she would prefer that Geoff stay, he packs his things and quietly leaves, stating that she will need someone with her who has gone through childbirth. Nervously, Jo tells Helen that her baby will be black; disturbed by this revelation, Helen leaves to buy alcohol. Jo notices Geoff's belongings are gone and finds his goodbye note. She goes outside, but only sees some children with fireworks around a bonfire. From the shadows, Geoff watches Helen return from the off-licence, and then sneaks away unseen. One of the children gives Jo a sparkler, and she solemnly watches it burn out.

== Cast ==
- Rita Tushingham as Josephine, who goes by "Jo"
- Dora Bryan as Helen, Jo's mother
- Robert Stephens as Peter Smith, Helen's boyfriend
- Murray Melvin as Geoffrey Ingham, Jo's friend
- Paul Danquah as Jimmy, Jo's boyfriend
- Margo Cunningham as the landlady (uncredited)
- Eunice Black as Jo's teacher (uncredited)
- David Boliver as Bert, a friend of Peter and Helen (uncredited)
- Moira Kaye as Doris, a friend of Peter and Helen (uncredited)
- Herbert Smith as Jo's boss at the shoe shop (uncredited)
- Michael Bilton as Jo's landlord (uncredited)
- Rosalie Williams as the obstetrician (uncredited)

Future Member of Parliament Hazel Blears and her brother Stephen appear as two street urchins.

== Production ==
The film was shot on location in Salford, Manchester, and Blackpool. The scene where Geoffrey gives Jo a doll was filmed in the churchyard of St Mary's Church, Stockport. Interiors were filmed in Chelsea, London, with the main location used for Jo and Helen's flat being 74 Elm Park Gardens.

== Release and reception ==
A Taste of Honey opened on 14 September 1961 at the Leicester Square Theatre in London's West End.

The film was banned in several countries. Tushingham reflected in 2020 that "a lot of the reaction was 'People like that don't exist' – by which they meant homosexuals, single mothers and people in mixed-race relationships. But they did."

=== Box office ===
Kinematograph Weekly claimed the film "didn't make such a big impact on the critics or the public as Saturday Night and Sunday Morning but was no mean hit."

The film made a profit of £29,064 for Bryanston Films.

=== Critical reception ===
Peter John Dyer gave a generally positive review in The Monthly Film Bulletin:

A Taste of Honey arrives with an advance, theatre-made reputation exceeded only by that of Woodfall's two John Osborne adaptations. It is remarkable that so shapeless, slender and unpretentious a film manages almost completely to stand up to this reputation. But then in some ways it is a realisation rather than an adaptation of Shelagh Delaney's play, with the music-hall mannerisms of the stage production largely removed and the locale vividly filled in. The film has the advantage of some lived-in, non-studio settings by Ralph Brinton, and the script, though it misses a little of the verbal richness and precision of the original (as in Jo's persistent request for details of Geoffrey's amatory activities, here muffed), achieves a warm feeling for relationships. Murray Melvin's wistful homosexual, with his pinched, troubled face and nervous kindness, and Dora Bryan's restless, casually effusive Helen, her broad shapeless features occasionally clouded by bitter self-awareness, could hardly be bettered. Something of a cross between Joan Plowright and Harriet Andersson, Rita Tushingham's Jo lacks technical accomplishment, but makes up for it with a spirited North Country protest and grave, haunting eyes which express exactly that bleak independence, the sudden snatching after ephemeral happiness in the midst of drab hopelessness, which is at the core of the play. Tony Richardson's direction, though geared throughout to the right mood, has not quite the rhythm and poetry to carry it through. His Blackpool fairground sequences are obviously handled along lines familiar from his previous films; and there is still too much putting-on of style (crowds of singing or playing children) as opposed to the natural lyricism of the sailor's leavetaking in silhouetted long-shot on the bridge. Certain passages are unnecessarily abrupt, while others – possibly due to a number of self-conscious dissolves – seem either dragged-out on the one hand or inconsequential and irrelevant on the other. John Addison's score adds an element of gratuitous rhetoric. But these remain minor considerations in the light of the simple, fresh appeal of the whole. A Taste of Honey, tart and lively around the edges and bitter at the core, is Richardson's best film to date.

A. H. Weiler of The New York Times gave the film a positive review, stating: "In being transported out of the theatre, this "Honey" has been enriched."

James Powers wrote in The Hollywood Reporter that the film was "the best British drama since Room at the Top", and contended that it "contains the only true portrait of homosexualism in the entire literature of modern books, plays and movies."

In 2017, The Radio Times Guide to Films gave the film five out of five stars, writing:

A ground-breaking movie of its time, this features the mousy Rita Tushingham in her screen debut as the unwanted teenage daughter of Dora Bryan, a hilariously vulgar Salford lass who is being courted by a flash and pimpish Robert Stephens. Our Rita is saved from her living hell by two social exiles – a black sailor, who makes her pregnant, and a homosexual who makes her happy until the poverty trap snaps shut around her. Set in dank bedsits amid the grimy smokestacks, polluted canals and the tacky prom at Blackpool, this movie – a romance of sorts, and a comedy – survives as a priceless barometer of England in 1961.

=== Accolades ===
Delaney and Richardson won the 1961 Writers' Guild of Great Britain award for Best British Dramatic Screenplay.

At the 1962 15th British Academy Film Awards, A Taste of Honey won in four categories: Best British Film, Best British Screenplay (tied with The Day the Earth Caught Fire), Best British Actress (Dora Bryan), and Most Promising Newcomer (Rita Tushingham).

Tushingham and Murray Melvin won Best Actress and Best Actor, respectively, at the 1962 Cannes Film Festival.

Richardson received a nomination at the 1962 15th Directors Guild of America Awards.

Tushingham won a 1963 Golden Globe for Most Promising Newcomer (tied with Patty Duke for The Miracle Worker and Sue Lyon for Lolita).

=== Legacy ===
In 1999, A Taste of Honey was ranked 56th on the British Film Institute's list of the top 100 British films of the century.

==== Home media ====
The Criterion Collection released a restored 4K digital transfer of the film on Blu-ray and DVD on 23 August 2016.

== See also ==
- Angry young men
- BFI Top 100 British films
- Cinema of the United Kingdom
- Independent cinema in the United Kingdom
