= Shelagh Delaney =

English playwright and screenwriter (1938–2011)

Shelagh Delaney FRSL
- Born: Sheila Mary Delaney; 25 November 1938; Broughton, Salford, Lancashire, England
- Died: 20 November 2011 (aged 72); Suffolk, England
- Occupations: Playwright, screenwriter, author
- Children: 1
- Writing career
- Period: 1958–2011
- Notable works: A Taste of Honey, The White Bus, Charlie Bubbles, Dance with a Stranger
- Notable awards: BAFTA Award for Best British Screenplay Writers' Guild of Great Britain Award Fellow of the Royal Society of Literature
- Movement: Kitchen sink realism

Shelagh Delaney FRSL (/ˈʃiːlə dəˈleɪniː/; 25 November 1938 – 20 November 2011) was an English playwright, screenwriter and author. Her debut work, A Taste of Honey (1958), has been described as "probably the most performed play by a post-war British woman playwright". Its 1961 film adaptation won the BAFTA Award for Best British Screenplay. She also wrote the BBC series The House That Jack Built (1977), radio plays and a collection of short stories. Delaney was elected a Fellow of the Royal Society of Literature in 1985.

== Early life ==
Sheila Mary Delaney was born on 25 November 1938 in Broughton, Salford, Lancashire to Irish-born bus inspector, Joseph, and Salford-born Elsie Tremlow. She later changed the spelling of her first name to Shelagh to sound more Irish before the premiere of her first play. She failed the eleven-plus exam and attended Broughton Secondary Modern school before transferring at the age of 15 to Pendleton High School, where she gained five O-levels.

== Career ==
=== Play: A Taste of Honey ===
Delaney wrote her first play in ten days, after seeing Terence Rattigan's Variation on a Theme (some sources say it was after seeing Waiting for Godot) at the Manchester Opera House during its pre-West End tour. Delaney felt she could do better than Rattigan, partly because she felt "Variation..." showed "insensitivity in the way Rattigan portrayed homosexuals". Her play A Taste of Honey was accepted by Joan Littlewood's Theatre Workshop. "Quite apart from its meaty content, we believe we have found a real dramatist", Gerry Raffles of Theatre Workshop said at the time. In the production's programme Delaney was described as "the antithesis of London's 'angry young men'. She knows what she is angry about."

A Taste of Honey, first performed on 27 May 1958, is set in her native Salford. "I had strong ideas about what I wanted to see in the theatre. We used to object to plays where the factory workers came cap in hand and call the boss 'sir'. Usually North Country people are shown as gormless, whereas in actual fact, they are very alive and cynical."

Reuniting the original cast, the play enjoyed a run of 368 performances in the West End from January 1959; it was also performed on Broadway, with Joan Plowright as Jo and Angela Lansbury as her mother in the original cast. It has been described by Michael Patterson in The Oxford Dictionary of Plays as "probably the most performed play by a post-war British woman playwright".

=== Other work ===
Delaney's second play The Lion in Love followed in 1960. The Encyclopedia of British Writers: 19th and 20th Centuries comments that it "portrays an impoverished family, whose income comes from peddling trinkets", but "the best qualities of the first play are absent." The novelist Jeanette Winterson has commented that the contemporary reviews of these first two plays' first performances "read like a depressing essay in sexism". Sweetly Sings the Donkey, a collection of short stories, appeared in 1963.

A Taste of Honey was adapted into a film of the same title, released in 1961 with Delaney as an extra in the opening netball scene. Delaney wrote the screenplay with the director, Tony Richardson. According to critics, the film script "contrives to keep in Delaney's best lines while creating a cinematic rather than a theatrical experience". It won the BAFTA Award for Best British Screenplay and the Writers' Guild of Great Britain Award in 1962. Delaney's other screenplays include The White Bus, Charlie Bubbles (both 1967) and Dance with a Stranger (1985). She also wrote the BBC series "The House That Jack Built" (1977), which she later adapted as an Off-Off-Broadway play in 1979.

Delaney wrote several radio plays, including Tell Me a Film (2003), Country Life (2004) and its sequel Whoopi Goldberg's Country Life, which was broadcast in The Afternoon Play slot on BBC Radio 4 in June 2010.

In 2011, after Delaney's death, an unproduced and unpublished script, Catch Me Who Can, was discovered by her daughter Charlotte Delaney. It was adapted, by Charlotte, as an audio production in 2026 and released on Spotify, with the voices of Toby Jones and Rita Tushingham.

== Death ==
Delaney died from breast cancer and heart failure in 2011, five days before her 73rd birthday, at the home of her daughter Charlotte in Suffolk, England, survived by her daughter and three grandchildren.

== Legacy ==
In 1985 Delaney was elected a Fellow of the Royal Society of Literature (FRSL).

In 1986, the Smiths' lead singer and lyricist Morrissey said: "I've never made any secret of the fact that at least 50 per cent of my reason for writing can be blamed on Shelagh Delaney". The lyrics of "This Night Has Opened My Eyes" are a retelling of the plot of A Taste of Honey, using many direct quotations from the play. Morrissey chose a photo of Delaney as the artwork on the album cover for the Smiths' 1987 compilation album Louder Than Bombs as well as the single "Girlfriend in a Coma".

The first full-length study of her life and work was written by John Harding in 2014, titled Sweetly Sings Delaney.

Tastes of Honey, a biography of Delaney by Selina Todd, was published in 2019.

== See also ==
- List of British playwrights since 1950
