= Rita Tushingham =

British actress (born 1942)

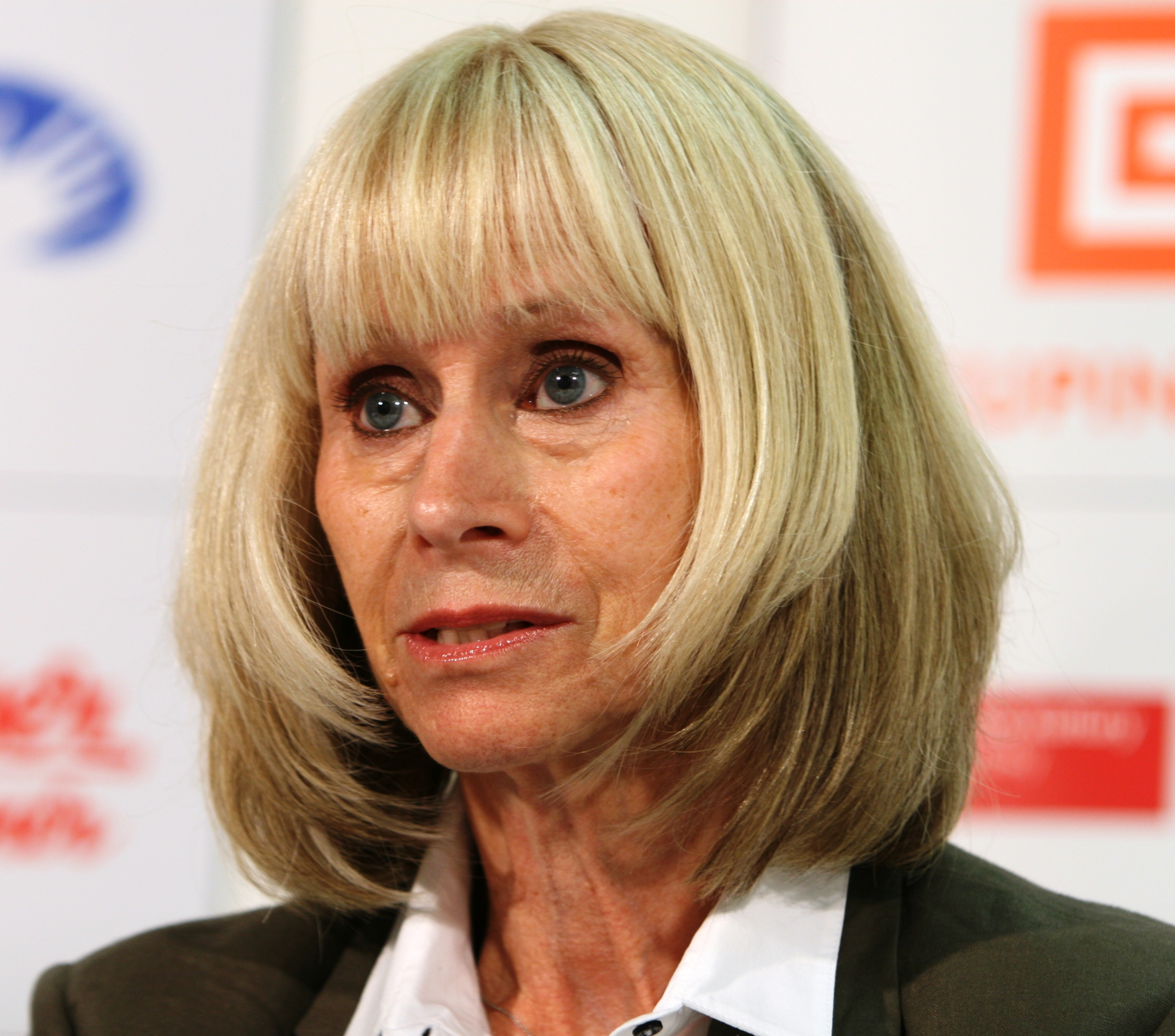
- Tushingham in 2008
- Born: 14 March 1942 (age 84); Garston, Liverpool, England
- Occupation: Actress
- Years active: 1961–present
- Spouse(s): Terry Bicknell (m. 1962; div. 1976) Ousama Rawi (m. 1981; div. 1996)
- Partner(s): Hans-Heinrich Ziemann (1994–present)
- Children: 2

Rita Tushingham (born 14 March 1942) is an English actress. She is known for her starring roles in films including A Taste of Honey (1961), The Leather Boys (1964), The Knack ...and How to Get It (1965), Doctor Zhivago (1965), and Smashing Time (1967). For A Taste of Honey, she won the Cannes Film Festival Award for Best Actress, and Most Promising Newcomer at both the BAFTA Awards and Golden Globe Awards. Her other film appearances include An Awfully Big Adventure (1995), Under the Skin (1997), Being Julia (2004), and Last Night in Soho (2021).

== Early life ==
Tushingham was born on 14 March 1942 in the Garston area of Liverpool, where her father was a grocer who ran three shops. She grew up in the Hunt's Cross district of the city. She attended the Heatherlea School in Allerton and the La Sagesse School in Grassendale (which later became part of St Julie's Catholic High School) and studied shorthand and typing at a secretarial school. She wanted to be an actress from an early age and trained at the Shelagh Elliott-Clarke School before working as an assistant stage manager at the Liverpool Playhouse.

== Career ==
Tushingham's screen debut was in A Taste of Honey (1961). In 2020, she said of the film: "We shocked audiences without intending to. I only learned later that Paul and I did the first interracial kiss on screen. ... A lot of the reaction was, 'People like that don’t exist' – by which they meant homosexuals, single mothers and people in mixed-race relationships. But they did." A Taste of Honey was banned in several countries.

Other performances by Tushingham have included Girl with Green Eyes (1964), The Leather Boys (1964),The Knack ...and How to Get It (1965), Doctor Zhivago (1965), The Trap (1966), Smashing Time (1967), The Bed Sitting Room (1969), and The 'Human' Factor starring George Kennedy and John Mills (1975). She also co-starred as Margaret Sheen in the TV film Green Eyes (1977).

In the 1960s, Tushingham performed several plays for the English Stage Company at the Royal Court Theatre: The Changeling (1961), The Kitchen (1961), A Midsummer Night's Dream (1962), Twelfth Night (production without décor, 1962) and The Knack (1962).

Tushingham has won a Golden Globe and a BAFTA Award, and was a member of the jury at the 22nd Berlin International Film Festival in 1972 and at the 40th Berlin International Film Festival in 1990.

Her later roles include the film Being Julia (2004), starring Annette Bening, and on television in "The Sittaford Mystery" (2006), an episode of Marple. She appeared in Series 2 of the BBC Three zombie drama In The Flesh as Mrs Lamb, broadcast in May 2014. In 2020 she appeared in the BBC One adaptation of The Pale Horse by Agatha Christie.

== Homages ==
In 1984, The Smiths/Sandie Shaw used an image of Tushingham on the sleeve of their UK single release "Hand In Glove", thereby adding her to what would become a significant set of musical releases, made iconic by their design (other Smiths 'cover stars' included Yootha Joyce, Truman Capote, Alain Delon, Terence Stamp, Elvis Presley, Pat Phoenix, Viv Nicholson, Billie Whitelaw and Shelagh Delaney). Clips from Tushingham's performance in The Leather Boys appeared in The Smiths' music video for the single "Girlfriend in a Coma", in 1987. She is also mentioned in the Franz Ferdinand song "L. Wells", the Cleaners From Venus song "Ilya Kuryakin Looked at Me", and the Television Personalities song "Favourite Films". In 1999, she was featured on This Is Your Life.

== Personal life ==
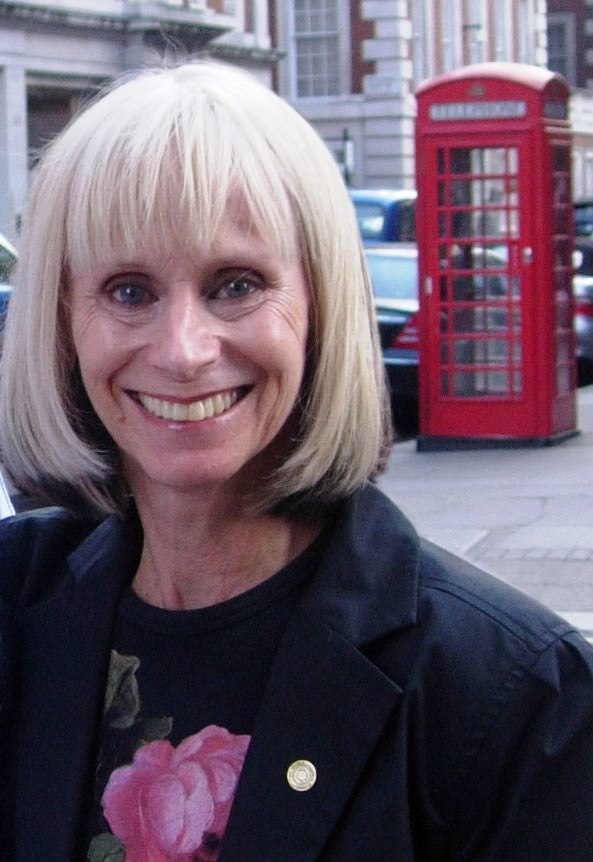
Tushingham in London (2006)

Tushingham married photographer Terry Bicknell in 1962. They had two daughters, Dodonna and Aisha, before divorcing in 1976. In 1981, she married Iraqi cinematographer Ousama Rawi, spending eight years in Canada with him before they separated. They were not legally divorced until 1996. She later divided her time between Germany and London with German writer Hans-Heinrich Ziemann, her partner since 1994. As of 2020 she lives alone in London, near her daughter Aisha and her grandchildren.

In April 2005, at the age of 33, Tushingham's daughter Aisha was diagnosed with breast cancer. She recovered and later gave birth to a son. Tushingham subsequently became an activist for breast cancer health and support. She is a prominent supporter of Cancer Research UK's Relay For Life and has given a number of interviews to raise breast cancer awareness.

In July 2009, Tushingham received an Honorary Fellowship from Liverpool John Moores University for "outstanding and sustained contributions to the performing arts". In a 2020 interview, she described herself as a "lifelong football fan" and a Liverpool F.C. supporter.

In June 2022, Tushingham was the guest for BBC Radio 4's Desert Island Discs. Her choices included "You'll Never Walk Alone" by Gerry and the Pacemakers, "Ev'ry Time We Say Goodbye" by Ella Fitzgerald and "Bridge over Troubled Water" by Simon & Garfunkel. Her book choice was Brewer's Dictionary of Phrase and Fable and her requested luxury item was a photograph of her family inside a book of Matt cartoons wrapped in a mosquito net.

== Filmography ==
=== Film ===
Year	Title	Role	Notes
1961	A Taste of Honey	Josephine "Jo"	
1963	A Place to Go	Catherine Donovan	
1964	The Leather Boys	Dot	
1964	Girl with Green Eyes	Kate Brady	
1965	The Knack ...and How to Get It	Nancy Jones	
1965	Doctor Zhivago	Tanya Komarova	
1966	The Trap	Eve	
1967	Smashing Time	Brenda	
1968	Diamonds for Breakfast	Bridget Rafferty	
1969	The Guru	Jenny	
1969	The Bed Sitting Room	Penelope	
1972	Straight on Till Morning	Brenda Thompson	
1974	Fischia il sesso	Carol Houston	
1974	Situation	Rita	
1975	Rachel's Man	Leah	
1975	The "Human" Factor	Janice	
1977	Bread, Butter and Marmalade	Vera De Virdis	
1977	Black Journal	Maria	
1978	Mysteries	Martha Gude	
1982	Spaghetti House	Kathy Ceccacci	
1986	A Judgment in Stone	Eunice Parchman	
1986	Flying	Jean Stoller	
1989	Resurrected	Mrs. Deakin	
1989	Hard Days, Hard Nights	Rita	
1992	Paper Marriage	Lou	
1992	Rapture of Deceit	Dora	
1994	Gospel According to Harry	Myrna	
1995	An Awfully Big Adventure	Aunt Lily	
1996	The Boy from Mercury	May Cronin	
1997	Under the Skin	Mum	
1999	Swing	Mags Luxford	
2000	Out of Depth	Margaret Nixon	
2004	Being Julia	Aunt Carrie	
2007	Puffball	Molly	
2007	The Hideout	Paula Hardyn	
2008	Broken Lines	Rae	
2008	Telstar: The Joe Meek Story	Essex Medium	
2009	The Calling	Sister Gertrude	
2011	Seamonsters	Rose	
2012	Outside Bet	Martha	
2013	The Wee Man	Rita Thompson	
2017	My Name Is Lenny	Reenie Joyce	
2020	The Owners	Ellen Huggins	
2021	Last Night in Soho	Peggy Turner	
2022	Boudica	Green Druid	
2024	The American Backyard	Flora	

=== Television ===
Year	Title	Role	Notes
1964	The Human Jungle	Joy South	Episode: "The Man Who Fell Apart"
1973	Armchair Theatre	Grace	Episode: "Red Riding Hood"
1974	No Strings	Leonora	6 episodes
1977	Green Eyes	Margaret Sheen	TV film
1980	Lady Killers	Charlotte Bryant	Episode: "Don't Let Them Kill Me on Wednesday"
1982	The Confessions of Felix Krull	Mrs. Twentyman	All 5 episodes
1984	Seeing Things	Dr. Jessica Edwards	Episode: "Seeing R.E.D."
1985	ABC Weekend Special	Mrs. Prysselius	Episode: "Pippi Longstocking"
1988	Bread	Celia Higgins	11 episodes
1989	The Legendary Life of Ernest Hemingway	Alice B. Toklas	TV film
1996	Theatre of the Air	Rochelle	Episode: "I've Been Eddie Mostyn"
1998	Spending Nights with Joan	Bette Davis	TV film
2002	Helen West	Margaret Mellors	Episode: "Shadow Play"
2002	The Stretford Wives	Marilyn Massey	TV film
2003	Life Beyond the Box: Margo	Celia Fishwick	TV film
2005	New Tricks	Elise	Episode: "Creative Problem Solving"
2006	Agatha Christie's Marple	Miss Elizabeth Percehouse	Episode: "The Sittaford Mystery"
2006	Angel Cake	Millie	TV film
2011	Bedlam	Grace	Episode: "Inmates"
2014	In the Flesh	Mrs. Lamb	3 episodes
2016	Neil Gaiman's Likely Stories	Effie Corvier	Episode: "Feeders and Eaters"
2018	Vera	Audrey Latham	Episode: "Home"
2018	Still Open All Hours	Annie	Episode: "Christmas Special"
2019	The Pale Horse	Bella Webb	All 3 episodes
2021	Ridley Road	Nettie Jones	All 4 episodes
2022	The Responder	June Carson	2 episodes
2024	The Marlow Murder Club	Mrs. Eddingham	All 10 episodes
2024	The Famous Five	Miss Clutterbuck	Episode: "Mystery at the Prospect Hotel"

== Awards and honours ==
Year	Award	Film	Result
1962	BAFTA Award for Most Promising Newcomer	A Taste of Honey	Won
1962	Cannes Film Festival Award for Best Actress	A Taste of Honey	Won
1963	Golden Globe Award for Most Promising Newcomer	A Taste of Honey	Won
1965	BAFTA Award for Best British Actress	Girl with Green Eyes	Nominated
1966	Golden Globe Award for Best Actress (musical or comedy)	The Knack ...and How to Get It	Nominated
1966	BAFTA Award for Best British Actress	The Knack ...and How to Get It	Nominated

Tushingham was made Honorary Associate of London Film School.
