= ASV Records =

British record label

- Founded: 1981
- Founder: Harley Usill; Kevin Daly; Jack Boyce
- Defunct: 2007
- Status: Defunct
- Genre: Classical, jazz
- Country of origin: England
- Location: London

ASV Records was a London-based record label set up by Harley Usill, founder of Argo Records, Decca producer and former Argo general manager, Kevin Daly, and producer Jack Boyce, after Argo's parent company Decca was bought by PolyGram in 1980. ASV stood for "Academy Sound and Vision". The label was bought by the Sanctuary Records Group in May 1999.

ASV, which was founded in London in 1981, was mainly a classical label, but its catalogue included Bing Crosby, Cole Porter, The Ink Spots, and The Boswell Sisters. Starting in 1986, ASV had an imprint called Living Era, created by Kevin Daly, which specialized in reissuing recordings (particularly American jazz recordings) that are in the public domain in the UK, which are all at least 50 years old. It also showcased American pop music, American country music, British dance bands, and British nostalgia.

Much of ASV's classical catalogue was reissued on Sanctuary's Resonance budget label. Sanctuary's UK recorded music business was shut down shortly after Universal Music Group bought the firm in 2007. This also included the ASV and ASV/Living Era imprints.

As a fulfilment of conditions imposed by the European Commission following UMG's acquisition of most of EMI in 2012, Universal sold Sanctuary to BMG Rights Management in 2013. Thus, Warner Music Group, through its Alternative Distribution Alliance division, handles the catalogue of reissues from ASV's artists' releases on Sanctuary's behalf after BMG designated ADA in March 2017 as its distributor.

== Roster ==
Conductors:

- Enrique Bátiz, Mexico
- Francesco D'Avalos, Italy
- David Allinson, United States
- Ross Pople, New Zealand
- Christoph Eschenbach, Germany
- Jane Glover, United Kingdom
- Andrew Carwood, United Kingdom
- Loris Tjeknavorian, Iran, Austria
- Steven Sloane, United States
- John Farrer, United States

Performers:

- London Festival Orchestra
- London Philharmonic Orchestra
- Mexico City Philharmonic Orchestra
- Nikolai Demidenko
- Robert Gibbs
- Young Uck Kim
- John Lill
- Jorge Luis Prats
- Julian Lloyd Webber
- Lindsay String Quartet
- The Cardinall's Musick
- Ensemble 360
- Gordon Fergus-Thompson
- New Chamber Opera Ensemble
- Emma Johnson
- Sandro Ivo Bartoli

== See also ==
- Lists of record labels
