= Cantiones sacrae =

Cantiones sacrae or Sacrae cantiones (Latin for "Sacred songs") may refer to:

- Sacrae cantiones for four, five, six or more voices, 1573 works by Alexander Utendal
- Cantiones quae ab argumento sacrae vocantur, a 1575 collection by William Byrd and Thomas Tallis
- Cantiones sacrae, 1589 and 1591 works by William Byrd
- Sacrae cantiones liber primus, 1592 works by Tiburtio Massaino
- Cantiones sacrae (Gesualdo), two collections of motets of Carlo Gesualdo da Venosa published in 1603
- Sacrae cantiones, 1614 works by Vincenzo Ugolini
- Cantiones sacrae (Schütz), a 1625 collection of forty different pieces of vocal sacred music by Heinrich Schütz
- Sacred Songs, a 1980 album by Daryl Hall
