= Nicol Williamson =

British actor (1936–2011)

- Born: Thomas Nicol Williamson; 14 September 1936; Hamilton, Lanarkshire, Scotland
- Died: 16 December 2011 (aged 75); Amsterdam, Netherlands
- Occupation: Actor
- Years active: 1956–1997
- Spouse: Jill Townsend (m. 1971; div. 1977)
- Children: 1

Thomas Nicol Williamson (14 September 1936 – 16 December 2011) was a British actor. He was described as "the greatest actor since Marlon Brando" and "touched by genius" by John Osborne and Samuel Beckett, respectively.

== Early life, family and education ==
Thomas Nicol Williamson was born on 14 September 1936 (Note: He would later claim his birth year was 1938 in Who's Who.) in Hamilton, Lanarkshire, Scotland, the son of Hugh Williamson, operator of an aluminium manufacturing plant and former hairdresser's assistant, and Mary Brown Hill, née Storrie. When he was 18 months old, his family moved to Birmingham, England. Williamson was sent back to Hamilton to live with his grandparents during World War II due to Birmingham's susceptibility to bombing, but he returned when the war ended.

He was educated at the Central Grammar School for Boys, Birmingham. He left school at 16 to begin work in his father's factory and later attended the Birmingham School of Speech & Drama. He recalled his time there as "a disaster" and claimed "it was nothing more than a finishing school for the daughters of local businessmen".

== Career ==
=== Acting ===
After his national service as a gunner in the Airborne Division, Williamson made his professional debut with the Dundee Repertory Theatre in 1960 and the following year appeared with the Arts Theatre in Cambridge. In 1962 he made his London debut as Flute in Tony Richardson's production of A Midsummer Night's Dream at the Royal Court Theatre. His first major success came in 1964 with John Osborne's Inadmissible Evidence, for which he was nominated for a Tony Award when it transferred to Broadway the following year. In spring 1981, he and original director Anthony Page revived the play for a six-week engagement at the Roundabout Theatre (23rd Street) in New York, fifteen years after the original Broadway run.

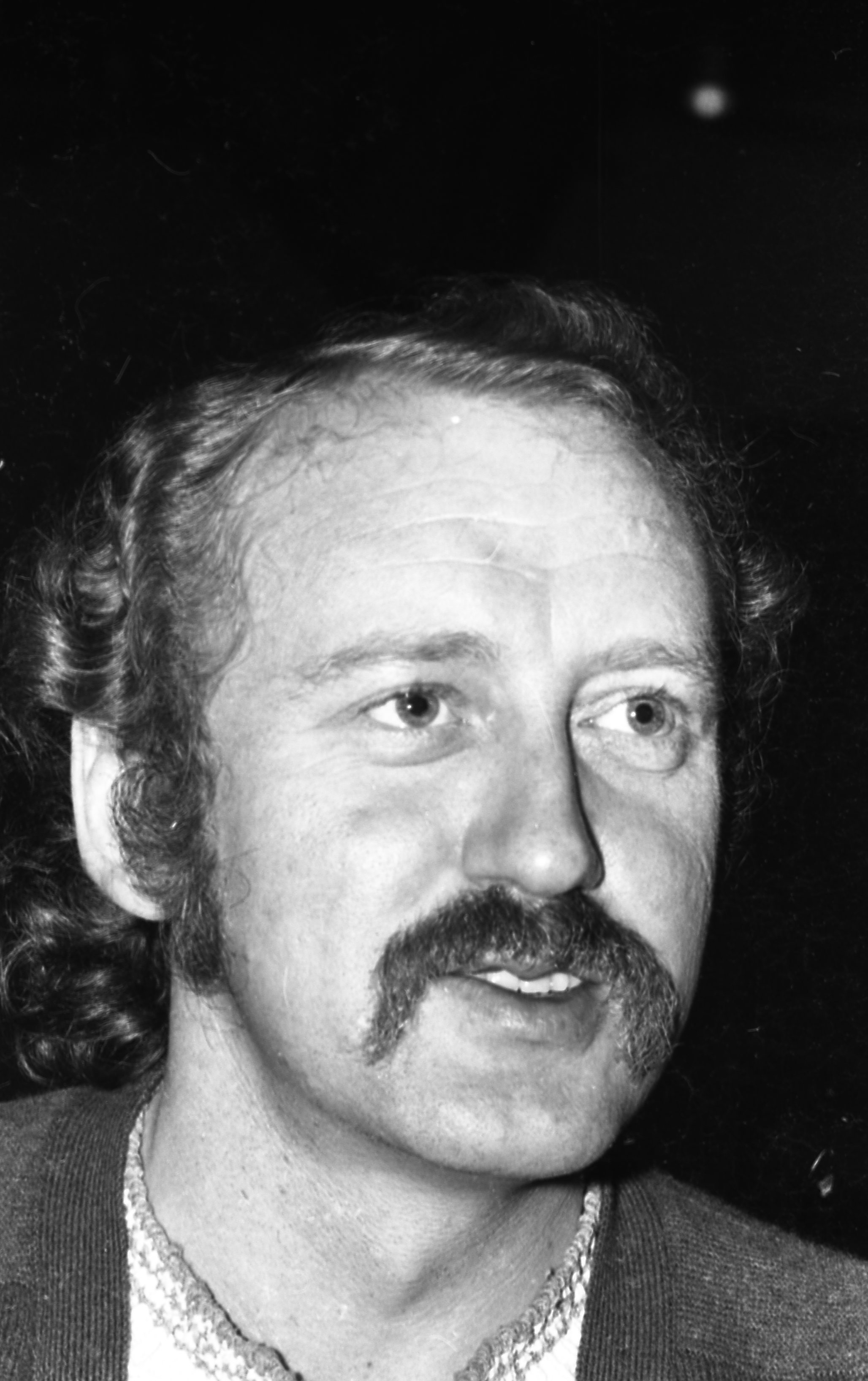
Williamson in 1971

Also in 1964, he appeared as Vladimir in Samuel Beckett's Waiting for Godot at the Royal Court. He starred in the film version in 1968. Williamson's Hamlet for Tony Richardson at the Roundhouse caused a sensation; it was later transferred to New York and made into a film, with a cast including Anthony Hopkins and Marianne Faithfull. Faithfull later stated in her autobiography Faithfull that she and Williamson had an affair while filming Hamlet.

His most celebrated film role was as Merlin the magician in the King Arthur epic Excalibur in 1981. Director John Boorman cast him opposite Helen Mirren as Morgana over the protests of both actors; the two had previously appeared together on stage in Macbeth, with disastrous results, and they disliked each other intensely. It was Boorman's hope that the very real animosity that they had towards each other would generate more tension between them on screen. Williamson gained recognition from a much wider fanbase for his performance as Merlin. A review of Excalibur in The Times in 1981 states: "The actors are led by Williamson's witty, perceptive Merlin, missed every time he's off the screen." According to Mirren, she and Williamson, free from the problems with Macbeth, "wound up becoming very good friends" during Excalibur.

Some of his other notable cinematic performances include as a troubled Irish soldier in the 1968 Jack Gold film The Bofors Gun; in 1975 as an intelligence officer in apartheid South Africa in The Wilby Conspiracy (starring Sidney Poitier and Michael Caine); as Sherlock Holmes in the 1976 Herbert Ross film The Seven-Per-Cent Solution; and as Little John in the 1976 Richard Lester film Robin and Marian. Additionally, he portrayed an MI6 bureaucrat in The Human Factor (1979) (adapted from a novel by Graham Greene); an alcoholic attorney in I'm Dancing as Fast as I Can (1982); a colonel in the Cincinnati Gestapo in the Neil Simon comedy The Cheap Detective; Lord Louis Mountbatten in Lord Mountbatten - The Last Viceroy (1985); the dual roles of Dr. Worley/The Nome King in Return to Oz (1985); Father Morning in The Exorcist III (1990); Badger in the 1996 movie adaptation of Kenneth Grahame's Wind in the Willows; and as Cogliostro in the 1997 movie adaptation of Todd McFarlane's comic book Spawn.

In 1978, Williamson portrayed a murderous behaviour expert in the Columbo episode "How to Dial a Murder". His character was one of the few suspects who attempted to kill Columbo.

=== Additional work ===
Following a late-night chat show appearance in which he showcased his singing talents, Williamson released an album of songs in 1971 on the CBS label (S 64045). The album contained songs such as "Didn't We", "It's Impossible" and "Help Me Make It Through the Night".

In 1974, Williamson recorded an abridged reading of The Hobbit for Argo Records, authorisation for the abridgement having been provided by J.R.R. Tolkien's publisher. The recording was produced by Harley Usill. According to his official website, Williamson re-edited the original script himself, removing many occurrences of "he said", "she said", and so on, as he felt that an over-reliance on descriptive narrative would not give the desired effect; he performed each character in a distinctive voice.

In 1994, Williamson wrote a play for solo actor on the life of actor John Barrymore. Jack, a Night on the Town with John Barrymore was produced at the Criterion Theatre in London.

Williamson made a major contribution to the documentary John Osborne and the Gift of Friendship, recalling episodes from his long professional relationship with Osborne. Recorded excerpts of his award-winning stage performance in Inadmissible Evidence also feature in the video.

== Personality ==
Williamson was known for throwing tantrums and engaging in other antics on stage. During the Philadelphia tryout of Inadmissible Evidence, a play in which he delivered a performance that would win him a Tony Award nomination in 1965, he punched the also-mercurial producer David Merrick. In 1968, he apologised to the audience for his performance one night while playing Hamlet and then walked off the stage, announcing he was retiring. In the early 1970s, Williamson left The Dick Cavett Show prior to a scheduled appearance, leaving the host and guest Nora Ephron to fill the remaining time. In 1976, he slapped actor Jim Litten during the curtain call for the Broadway musical Rex. According to actor Stacy Keach, Williamson was fired from the lead role in The Ninth Configuration (1980) for ripping out a telephone from the wall of his hotel suite in Budapest, and tossing it through a plate glass window. In 1991, he hit co-star Evan Handler on the backside with a sword during a Broadway performance of I Hate Hamlet. This notoriously resulted in Handler walking out of the theater and an understudy taking over his role mid-performance.

== Personal life ==
In 1971, Williamson married actress Jill Townsend, who had played his daughter in the Broadway production of Inadmissible Evidence. They had a son, Luke (born 1973), but divorced in 1977.

Despite concerns over his health in the 1970s, Williamson admitted drinking heavily and claimed to smoke 80 cigarettes a day. In an episode of The David Frost Show in the 1960s, during a discussion about death, which also involved poet John Betjeman, Williamson revealed that he was very much afraid of dying, saying that "I think of death constantly, throughout the day" and that "I don't think there is anything after this, except complete oblivion."

Williamson died on 16 December 2011 in Amsterdam, aged 75, two years after being diagnosed with esophageal cancer. In accord with Williamson's wishes, the news of his death was released a month later, as he did not want a fuss made over his death.

== Acting credits ==
=== Film ===
Year	Title	Role	Notes
1956	The Iron Petticoat	Man lighting Major Lockwood's distorted cigarette	Uncredited
1963	The Six-Sided Triangle	The Lover	Short film
1968	The Bofors Gun	O'Rourke	Nominated — BAFTA Award for Best Actor in a Leading Role
1968	Inadmissible Evidence	Bill Maitland	Nominated — BAFTA Award for Best Actor in a Leading Role
1969	The Reckoning	Michael Marler	
1969	Laughter in the Dark	Sir Edward More	Won — Prize San Sebastián for Best Actor
1969	Hamlet	Prince Hamlet	
1972	The Jerusalem File	Professor Lang	
1972	The Monk	The Duke of Talamur	
1975	The Wilby Conspiracy	Major Horn	
1976	Robin and Marian	Little John	
1976	The Seven-Per-Cent Solution	Sherlock Holmes	
1977	The Goodbye Girl	Oliver Fry	(uncredited Hollywood producer/director)
1978	The Cheap Detective	Colonel Schlissel	
1979	The Human Factor	Maurice Castle	
1981	Excalibur	Merlin	Nominated — Saturn Award for Best Supporting Actor
1981	Venom	Commander William Bulloch	
1982	I'm Dancing as Fast as I Can	Derek Bauer	
1985	Return to Oz	Dr. Worley/Nome King	
1987	Black Widow	William McCrory	
1987	Passion Flower	Albert Coskin	TV film
1990	The Exorcist III	Father Morning	
1993	The Hour of the Pig	Seigneur Jehan d'Auferre	
1996	The Wind in the Willows	Mr. Badger	
1997	Spawn	Cogliostro	

=== Television ===
Year	Title	Role	Notes
1963	ITV Play of the Week	Count Pierre Besukhov	Episode: "War and Peace"
1963	Z-Cars	Jack Clark	Episode: "By the Book"
1963	Teletale	Dr. Murke	Episode: "Dr. Murke's Collection of Silences"
1965	Six	Unknown role	Episode: "The Day of Ragnarok"
1965	The Wednesday Play	Robin Fletcher	Episode: "Horror of Darkness"
1968	Of Mice and Men	Lennie	TV film (Video)
1971	Thirty-Minute Theatre	Jim Fitch	Episode: "Terrible Jim Fitch"
1972	The Gangster Show: The Resistible Rise of Arturo Ui	Arturo Ui	TV film Nominated — British Academy Television Award for Best Actor
1974	Late Night Drama	President Nixon	Episode: "I Know What I Meant"
1978	Columbo	Dr. Eric Mason	Episode: "How to Dial a Murder"
1978	The Word	Maertin de Vroome	TV mini-series
1983	Macbeth	Macbeth	BBC Television Shakespeare; videotaped TV drama
1984	Sakharov	Malyarov	TV film
1985	Christopher Columbus	King Ferdinand	TV mini-series
1986	Lord Mountbatten: The Last Viceroy	Lord Louis Mountbatten	TV serial
1990	Chillers	Stephen McCullough	Episode: "A Curious Suicide"

=== Theatre ===
Year	Title	Role	Notes
1962	A Midsummer Night's Dream	Francis Flute	English Stage Company, Royal Court Theatre, London
1962	Nil Carborundum	S A C Albert Meakin	Royal Shakespeare Company, New Arts Theatre, London
1962	The Lower Depths	Satin	Royal Shakespeare Company, New Arts Theatre, London
1962	Women Beware Women	Leantio	Royal Shakespeare Company, New Arts Theatre, London
1962-3	Kelly's Eye	Performer	Royal Court Theatre
1964-6	Inadmissible Evidence	Bill Maitland	English Stage Company, Royal Court Theatre, London, Wyndham’s Theatre, London, Belasco Theatre, New York and Shubert Theatre, New York.
1965	A Cuckoo in the Nest	Peter Wykeham	Royal Court Theatre
1965	Homage to T. S. Eliot	Performer	Original London Production
1968	Plaza Suite	Jesse Kiplinger, Roy Hubley, Sam Nash	Broadway
1969	Hamlet	Hamlet	Free Theatre, The Roundhouse Theatre, London
1973	Coriolanus	Coriolanus	Royal Shakespeare Company, Aldwych Theatre, London
1973	Uncle Vanya	Ivan Petrovich Voynitsky	Broadway
1973	Midwinter Spring	Devised by/Performer	Royal Shakespeare Company, Aldwych Theatre, London
1974-5	Twelfth Night	Malvolio	Royal Shakespeare Company, Stratford-upon-Avon
1974-5	Macbeth	Macbeth	Royal Shakespeare Company, Stratford-upon-Avon
1974	Uncle Vanya	Director / Ivan Petrovich Voynitsky	Royal Shakespeare Company, Stratford-upon-Avon
1975	The Actors Are Come Hither…Buzz, Buzz	Performer	Royal Shakespeare Company, Aldwych Theatre, London
1976	Rex	King Henry VIII	Original Broadway Production
1982	Macbeth	Macbeth	Broadway Revival
1984	The Real Thing	Henry	Broadway
1991	I Hate Hamlet	John Barrymore	Broadway
1994-6	Jack: A Night on the Town with John Barrymore	John Barrymore	Criterion Theatre, London, Broadway
2001	King Lear	King Lear	Clwyd Theatr Cymru

== Awards and nominations ==
Nicol Williamson was nominated for three BAFTA Awards, a Saturn Award, two Tony Awards, and won the Silver Shell for the Best Actor from the San Sebastián International Film Festival in 1969 for his performance in Laughter in the Dark.

=== BAFTA Awards ===
Year	Nominee / work	Award	Result
1969	The Bofors Gun	Best Actor in a Leading Role	Nominated
1970	Inadmissible Evidence	Best Actor in a Leading Role	Nominated
1973	The Gangster Show: The Resistible Rise of Arturo Ui	Television Award for Best Actor	Nominated

=== Drama Desk Awards ===
Year	Nominee / work	Award	Result
1969	Hamlet	Outstanding Performance	Won
1974	Uncle Vanya	Outstanding Performance	Won
1976	Rex	Outstanding Actor in a Musical	Nominated

=== Laurence Olivier Award ===
Year	Work	Award	Result
1978	Inadmissible Evidence	Actor of the Year in a Revival	Nominated

=== Saturn Awards ===
Year	Nominee / work	Award	Result
1982	Excalibur	Best Supporting Actor	Nominated

=== Tony Awards ===
Year	Nominee / work	Award	Result
1966	Inadmissible Evidence	Best Actor in a Play	Nominated
1974	Uncle Vanya	Best Actor in a Play	Nominated

== See also ==
- List of British actors
