= James Wood (musician) =

British composer, percussionist and conductor

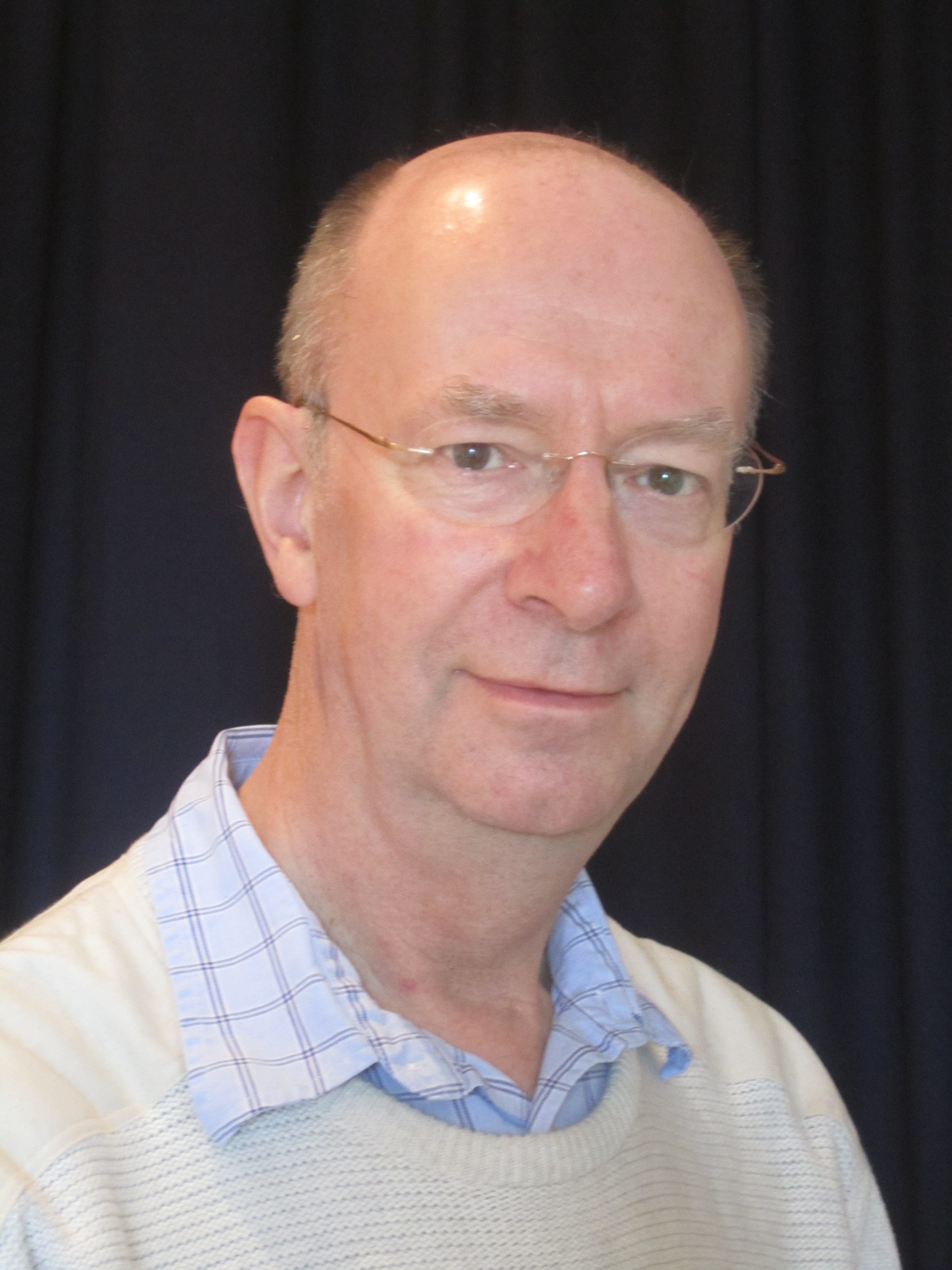
James Wood in 2015

James Wood (born 27 May 1953 in Barton-on-Sea, England) is a British conductor, composer of contemporary classical music and former percussionist. Wood studied composition with Nadia Boulanger in Paris from 1971 to 1972 before going on to study music at Cambridge University, where he was organ scholar of Sidney Sussex College from 1972 until 1975. After graduating from Cambridge he went on to study percussion and conducting at the Royal Academy of Music, London, from 1975 until 1976. After a further year studying percussion privately with Nicholas Cole, Wood embarked on a triple career as percussionist, composer and conductor.

== Career ==
In 1977 he was appointed conductor of the Schola Cantorum of Oxford, a post which he held until 1981, and immediately following this he founded the New London Chamber Choir, of which he was principal conductor for twenty-six years until moving to Germany in 2007.

=== New London Chamber Choir (NLCC) ===
During his time with NLCC he pioneered a large amount of little-known choral music from a wide range of composers, including Iannis Xenakis, Tona Scherchen, Toru Takemitsu, Eric Bergman, Harrison Birtwistle, Lili Boulanger, Ruth Crawford, Luigi Dallapiccola, Frank Denyer, György Kurtág, György Ligeti, Almeida Prado, Giacinto Scelsi, Alfred Schnittke, Claude Vivier, Walter Zimmermann and Wood himself. He was also responsible for the commissioning many new works (many of which included electronics) from composers including Jonathan Harvey (Forms of Emptiness, Ashes Dance Back, The Summer Cloud’s Awakening), Alejandro Vinao (Epitafios), Javier Álvarez (Calacas Imaginarias), Iannis Xenakis (Knephas), Luca Francesconi (Let me Bleed), Simon Bainbridge (Eicha), Roberto Sierra (Cantos Populares) and David Sawer (Stramm Gedichte). Many of Wood’s own works were also specially written for NLCC, including Incantamenta (for 24 solo voices), Phainomena (for 18 solo voices, 17 instruments and electronics) and his large-scale church opera, Hildegard, for soloists, chorus, ensemble and electronics.

With NLCC Wood undertook numerous CD recordings, many of which were world premiere recordings: these included music by Eric Bergman (Chandos), Lili Boulanger (Hyperion), Ruth Crawford Seeger (Deutsche Grammophon), Giacinto Scelsi (Una Corda), Frank Denyer (Continuum), Iannis Xenakis (Hyperion) and James Wood himself. They also recorded music of Poulenc and Janáček for Hyperion, and Dallapiccola for Erato. Their 1990 Hyperion recording of Stravinsky’s Les Noces (performed in collaboration with the choir of the Institute of the Arts, Voronezh, Russia) was voted ‘best available recording’ in BBC Radio 3's 'Building a Library' in September 2000. They also collaborated with Oliver Knussen and the London Sinfonietta in a recording of Stravinsky’s The Flood and Requiem Canticles. In 1988, Wood helped devise a BBC Two documentary about Lili Boulanger – Whom the Gods Loved, directed by Hilary Boulding. The film culminated in performances of Boulanger's Pie Jesu as well as her monumental Du fond de l’abîme with Linda Hirst, Martyn Hill, New London Chamber Choir and the London Sinfonietta.

=== Percussion activities ===
Wood was also active as a percussionist in many contemporary ensembles including Lontano, Gemini, Matrix (director Alan Hacker), Dreamtiger, Endymion and the London Sinfonietta. In this capacity he was noticed by the new director of the Darmstädter Ferienkurse, Friedrich Ferdinand Hommel, who invited him to succeed Christoph Caskel as Professor of Percussion from 1982. He retained this position throughout the Hommel years until 1994. During this time he pioneered a wide range of new music for solo percussion and percussion ensemble, including many new pieces of his own, such as Choroi kai Thaliai (1982), Ho shang Yao (1983) and Rogosanti (1986), which he toured extensively with the soprano Sara Stowe and the sound engineer John Whiting. All of these pieces were also recorded for CD and released by Continuum. He was artistic director of the 1988 and 1990 Percussion Festivals in London, and also devised two BBC TV documentaries on percussion in the BBC Two series Music in Camera, directed by Hilary Boulding.

One of Friedrich Hommel’s principal aims as Director of the Darmstädter Ferienkurse had always been to establish the courses as a centre for the rapidly evolving world of percussion. To this end he commissioned Wood to write a large-scale work for percussion ensemble which would make full use of the large number of talented young percussionists from all over the world who were coming to Darmstadt for the summer courses. The result was Stoicheia, a 65-minute work for two percussion soloists, two percussion ensembles, four synthesizers and electronics. The two soloists were Steven Schick and Wood himself, and the work was subsequently recorded by Wergo.

=== 1980s and 1990s ===
During the period from 1983 onwards Wood started to experiment with microtonality. In Ho shang Yao (Songs by the River) he devised simple prototype quartertone extensions for marimba and glockenspiel. As a result of this and further experiments in works such as Spirit Festival with Lamentations, Stoicheia and the quartertone marimba concerto, Venancio Mbande talking with the trees, he became convinced that any future for microtonality would have to involve first and foremost the development of microtonal fixed-pitch instruments (for example keyboard percussion instruments) and the adoption of satisfactory designs by commercial instrument builders. Following his own second prototype quartertone marimba extension the design was taken up by the Dutch company, Adams, who produce them on special order.

But outside the realm of purely fixed-pitch instruments, Wood was also active in writing microtonal music for conventional instruments – this led to one of Wood’s largest-scale works, Oreion, for large orchestra. Commissioned by the BBC for the 1989 Proms (9 August), this 30-minute work was performed by the BBC Symphony Orchestra conducted by Wood himself. The work was subsequently selected for performance at the 1991 ISCM Festival in Zürich, performed this time by the Krakow Radio Orchestra, again conducted by the composer.

This experience led to the idea of engaging in some kind of research and training programme for instrumentalists in microtonal performance, and so in 1990 Wood founded London's first Centre for Microtonal Music, and its ensemble, Critical Band. The purpose of the Microtonal Centre was to research instrumental microtonal playing techniques, to teach these to young musicians whilst at the same time educating composers in the historical, theoretical, emotional and practical implications of microtonality. The initiative involved the collaboration of the Society for the Promotion of New Music (SPNM), the Guildhall School of Music and Drama, and the Barbican Centre in London, which held a Weekend of Microtonal Music, 'In Tune?', in 1990, 1991 and 1992. Aside from its presence at the 'In Tune?' Festivals, the ensemble 'Critical Band' undertook several recordings, concerts and tours, including a CD of three of Wood's own compositions: Venancio Mbande talking with the Trees, Phainomena and Two men meet, each presuming the other to be from a distant planet. This latter work was also premiered by Critical Band at the 1995 BBC Proms (September 11). But after the late 1990s, both the Centre for Microtonal Music and Critical Band became disbanded through lack of funding.

Ever conscious of the fact that electronic music provided a perfect medium in which to explore his love for both microtonality and new sounds, Wood decided to immerse himself more fully in this world, and in 1996 undertook a major project at IRCAM in Paris. He worked together with Carl Faia on a new work for Alphorn, MIDI-cowbells and electronics – Mountain Language – from 1997 to 1998. This marked the start of a series of works involving electronics, including Séance (1996), Jodo (1999), Autumn Voices (2001) and the opera, Hildegard (2002–2006).

=== Recent developments and move to Germany ===
From the mid-1990s, Wood also started to receive conducting invitations from several European ensembles, including l’Itinéraire, Ensemble InterContemporain, musikFabrik and Champ d’Action, and choirs including Netherlands Radio Choir, Netherlands Chamber Choir, Swedish Radio Choir, Collegium Vocale Gent, West German Radio Choir, Berlin Radio Choir, RIAS Kammerchor, as well as the Tokyo Philharmonic Choir. In 2002, he worked closely with Karlheinz Stockhausen on the world premiere of Engel-Prozessionen, which he conducted at the Amsterdam Concertgebouw with the Netherlands Radio Choir. In 2011, he conducted the same work as part of Cologne Opera's production of the opera, Sonntag aus Licht.

Wood's increasing activity in mainland Europe eventually led, in 2007, to his decision to leave England for Germany. Since then Wood has continued to work regularly with choirs and ensembles throughout Europe, notably the Netherlands Radio Choir, musikFabik, Berlin Radio Choir, RIAS Kammerchor and the MDR Rundfunkchor in Leipzig, as well as remaining prolific as a composer. Notable performances include Luigi Nono’s Caminantes Ayacucho with the Netherlands Radio Choir and Netherlands Radio Chamber Philharmonic Orchestra at the 2008 Holland Festival; his training of the Vienna State Opera Chorus for Nono’s Al gran sole carico d’amore at the 2009 Salzburg Festival, conducted by Ingo Metzmacher; the first ever performance with live pianolist (Rex Lawson) of Theo Verbey’s completion of Stravinsky’s 1919 version Les Noces with musikFabrik and RIAS Kammerchor at the Berlin Philharmonie in 2013; and the German premiere of Wood's own Tongues of Fire (for large chorus and percussion quartet) with the MDR Rundfunkchor in Leipzig in November 2014.

From 2008 until 2011, he undertook the reconstruction of the two missing voices of the Sacrae Cantiones Liber Secundus of the sixteenth-century Italian composer, Carlo Gesualdo. This massive undertaking culminated in his recording of the complete set with Vocalconsort Berlin for Harmonia Mundi. Released in February 2013, the recording went on to receive universal critical acclaim, and was awarded the ECHO Klassik Preis in the category ‘Choir Recording of the Year’ in October 2013.

Following a joint commission from the Dutch Ensemble, Insomnio, the Stichting De Vrede van Utrecht and the Eduard Van Beinum Stichting, Wood then undertook a collaboration with the writer, Paul Griffiths and the director, Sybille Wilson on the opera, Gulliver, based on Gulliver’s Travels by Jonathan Swift – a project which lasted three years, from 2011 until 2014. At the same time he completed several new works for percussion, including a 35-minute work for percussion ensemble, Cloud-Polyphonies, commissioned by a consortium of American Universities headed by Michael Rosen.

From 2008 until 2020 Wood directed the Tenso Young Composers Workshops, designed to help and encourage young composers from all over Europe in composing for chamber choir.

From October 2025 Wood has been a Guest Professor for Composition at the Hanns Eisler Hochschule für Musik in Berlin.

== Awards and honours ==
- 1980 : Lili Boulanger Memorial Prize
- 1993 : Gemini Fellowship
- 1995/6 : Arts Foundation Fellowship for electro-acoustic composition
- 1996 : Holst Foundation Award
- 1990 : appointed a Fellow of the Royal Academy of Music, London
- 2013 : ECHO Klassik Prize (Choir Recording of the Year) together with Vocalconsort Berlin for their Harmonia Mundi recording of Wood’s reconstruction of Gesualdo’s Sacrae Cantiones Liber Secundus.

== List of works ==
Year	Title	Instrumentation
1976	Missa: In memoriam Lili Boulanger	soprano, double chorus, 4 trumpets, 4 trombones, organ
1981	Two Motets to verses from the Prophet Isaiah	soprano, flute, oboe, viola and harp
1982	Choroi kai Thaliai (Revels and Dances)	solo percussion, soprano, tape
1983	Drama (for the Kings Singers)	2 countertenors, tenors, 2 baritones, bass
1983	Ho shang Yao (Songs by the River)	soprano, solo percussion
1984	String Quartet	String Quartet
1985	Barong	2 pianos and 2 percussion
1985	Tien chung Yao (Songs from the Fields)	soprano and 2 percussionists
1986	Rogośanti	solo percussion
1987	Marsyapollonomachia	oboe and percussion
1988	Stoicheia	2 solo percussionists, 2 percussion ensembles, 4 synthesizers and electronics
1989	Oreion	large orchestra
1989	Village Burial with Fire	percussion quartet
1991	Incantamenta	24 solo voices
1992	Phainomena	18 voices, 17 instruments and tape
1993	Spirit Festival with Lamentations	quartertone marimba and percussion quartet
1993	Cart-wheels	bass clarinet and percussion
1993	Elanga N'Kake singing to his craft	solo percussionist/vocalist
1994	Venancio Mbande talking with the trees	Concerto for quartertone marimba (and various wooden instruments) and 15 instruments
1995	Two men meet, each presuming the other to be from a distant planet	Concerto for percussionist and 24 instruments
1995	The Parliament of Angels	Concerto for 18 musicians
1996	Children at a funeral	prepared piano
1996	Séance	soprano, MIDI-vibraphone, chorus and electronics
1997	Shrine of Stored Incense	solo percussion
1998	Mountain Language	alphorn, MIDI-cowbells and electronics
1999	Jodo	Music Theatre for solo percussion, soprano and electronics
2000	Journey of the Magi	large ensemble
2000	Déploration sur la mort de Gérard Grisey	marimba and string quartet
2001	Tongues of Fire	large chorus and percussion quartet
2002	Crying Bird, Echoing Star	flute, clarinet, violin, cello, piano
2006	Hildegard	Opera for soprano, baritone, chorus, ensemble, percussion ensemble and electronics
2007	De telarum mechanicae	ensemble of 15 instruments
2010	Gesualdo: Sacrae Cantiones Liber Secundus (Reconstruction)	6 voices
2011	Cloud-Polyphonies	percussion sextet
2012	Sea Dances	percussion trio
2014	Gulliver	Chamber Opera for baritone, vocal sextet and ensemble of 15 players
2014	Secret Dialogues	solo marimba

== Discography (works by James Wood) ==
Year	Label	Work	Performers
1990	Wergo [WER6194-2]	Stoicheia	Steven Schick, James Wood (solo percussionists), Darmstadt Percussion Ensemble, Cornwall Percussion Ensemble, Eleanor Alberga, Helen Crayford, Paul Webster, Clive Williamson (synthesizers), John Whiting (sound projection)
1991	Continuum [CCD1037]	Choroi kai Thaliai	Sara Stowe (soprano), James Wood (percussion), John Whiting (sound projection)
1991	Continuum [CCD1037]	Ho shang Yao	Sara Stowe (soprano), James Wood (percussion)
1991	Continuum [CCD1037]	Rogosanti	James Wood (percussion)
1991	Continuum [CCD1037]	Incantamenta	New London Chamber Choir (conducted by James Wood)
1995	Mode Records [Mode-51]	Village Burial with Fire	Percussive Rotterdam
1995	Mode Records [Mode-51]	Spirit Festival with Lamentations	Robert van Sice (quartertone marimba), Percussive Rotterdam
1997	NMC [DO44]	Venancio Mbande talking with the trees	Kuniko Kato (quartertone marimba), Critical Band conducted by James Wood
1997	NMC [DO44]	Phainomena	New London Chamber Choir, Critical Band conducted by James Wood
1997	NMC [DO44]	Two men meet, each presuming the other to be from a distant planet	Steven Schick (solo percussion), Critical Band (conducted by James Wood)
2003	London Independent Records [LIR003]	Crying Bird, Echoing Star	New Music Players, conducted by Roger Montgomery
2008	CAG Records [cag-103]	Rogosanti	Svet Stoyanov (percussion)
2010	Encora [enc-011]	De telarum mechanicae	Insomnio, conducted by Ulrich Pöhl
