= Peter Hill (pianist) =

British pianist and musicologist

Peter P Hill (born 14 June 1948) is a British pianist and musicologist.

== Biography ==
Hill, a native of Sheffield, was awoken to 20th century music when he bought some Schoenberg in a Winchester music shop and "played those Op.19 pieces with a kind of missionary zeal... this taught me about the only real reason for playing music – that you feel passionately about it and want to communicate something"; he later recorded all Schoenberg's piano music for the BBC. He had been a chorister as a child, read music at Oxford then continued his studies at the Royal College of Music, both with Cyril Smith with whom he studied from age of 19, and pursued a research fellowship on Xenakis at Royal Holloway College. Later he studied with Nadia Boulanger. He was a founder member of the contemporary music group Dreamtiger. He was awarded first prize at Darmstadt in 1974 for performances of music by Cage and Stockhausen. He became a lecturer in the Department of music at Sheffield University in 1976 and was co-director with violinist Peter Cropper of an MA in Music Performance course, alongside undergraduate teaching.

He was acquainted with the French composer Olivier Messiaen, visiting him several times in Paris and has edited a volume of essays on Messaien's music (The Messaien Companion) and co-written a book about him. As well as playing the complete works of Messiaen, he is also known for his performances of other 20th-century piano repertoire. Among other recordings are Beethoven's Diabelli Variations (for which he also wrote the booklet essay), a Schubert lieder recital with soprano Lynda Russell on Naxos, Stravinsky, and music of the Second Viennese School (Schoenberg, Berg and Webern). Of his first recording, the complete piano music of Brian issued in 1982, John Ogdon in Tempo commented that the "playing is remarkable for its even tone control: alternately lyrical and dynamic, it suggests at times the influence of Busoni and Petri."

Hill's career has taken him to Europe and the United States. He is now an Emeritus Professor of Music at the University of Sheffield and a Fellow of the Royal Northern College of Music.

In November 2013, he gave the world premiere of Messiaen's piano piece La Fauvette passerinette (1961), which he discovered and edited for performance.

== Publications ==
- Hill, Peter (1994). The Messiaen Companion.
- Hill, Peter (2000). Stravinsky: The Rite of Spring. Cambridge: Cambridge University Press. ISBN 0-521-62714-1.
- Hill, Peter; Simeone, Nigel (2005). Messiaen. Yale University Press. ISBN 978-0-300-10907-8.
- Hill's recordings of Messiaen's piano music, made under the guidance of the composer, for Unicorn-Kanchana, were later available on the Regis label.
