= Inadmissible Evidence =

John Osborne play

- Faber and Faber first edition, 1965
- Original language: English
- Written by: John Osborne
- Setting: The present. A solicitor's office in East London.

Premiere
- Date: September 9, 1964
- Place: Royal Court Theatre, London

Inadmissible Evidence is a play written by John Osborne in 1964. It was film adapted in 1968.

== Description ==
The protagonist of the play is William Maitland, a 39-year-old English solicitor who has come to hate his entire life. Much of the play consists of lengthy monologues in which Maitland tells the audience about his life, a life he now regards as an utter failure. He readily acknowledges that he is bored with his wife and children, and just as bored by the petty, meaningless love affairs he's been carrying on with other women. His career revolves around sordid divorce cases, and he's come to despise both his clients and his colleagues. Maitland drinks heavily, and enjoys bullying and insulting everyone he comes into contact with.

In Act One, like a prosecutor presenting a case, Maitland brutally shows the audience the utter despair and mediocrity of his life. In Act Two, Maitland's crimes receive their due punishment, as he is deserted by everyone he ever cared about, including his clerk, his mistress and his wife. At times the play uses the technique of intercut monologues, which are arranged like dialogue but involve no communication between the characters.

The role of Maitland was created by Nicol Williamson who played the role in Anthony Page's original Royal Court production, in its 1965 Broadway debut, and in the 1968 movie version. In 1965 the play transferred to Wyndham's Theatre in London's West End. Williamson played Maitland, with John Hurt as Jones, Cyril Raymond as Hudson, Clare Kelly as Joy, and Eleanor Fazan as Liz. In spring 1981, he and original director Anthony Page revived the play for a six-week engagement at the Roundabout Theatre (23rd Street) in New York, fifteen years after the original Broadway run.

== Original Royal Court cast ==
- Jones – John Quentin
- Bill Maitland – Nicol Williamson
- Hudson – Arthur Lowe
- Shirley – Ann Beach
- Joy – Lois Daine
- Mrs. Garnsey – Clare Kelly
- Jane Maitland – Natasha Pyne
- Liz – Sheila Allen

== Film adaptation ==
In 1968 the play was made into a film by the play's director Anthony Page, and starring Nicol Williamson, Eleanor Fazan and Jill Bennett.

== Awards and nominations ==
=== Original Broadway production ===
Year	Award	Category	Nominee	Result
1966	Tony Award	Best Play		Nominated
1966	Tony Award	Best Actor in a Play	Nicol Williamson	Nominated
