= Dreamtiger =

Background information
- Origin: London, United Kingdom
- Genres: Contemporary classical
- Occupation: Chamber orchestra
- Years active: 1974–1984
- Past members: Founder Douglas Young, Kathryn Lukas, Peter Hill, Rohan de Saram

Dreamtiger was a British contemporary music ensemble specializing in chamber music and Eastern influences in 20th-century music. It was created and directed by composer Douglas Young (born 1947) in 1974 while he was studying at Trinity College in Cambridge.

== Membership ==
Named after a Jorge Luis Borges short story, Dreamtiger performed in variable configurations, from duo to sextet. It was formed around the core membership of pianist, composer and musical director Douglas Young, virtuoso flutist Kathryn Lukas, pianist Peter Hill (who recorded Messiaen's complete works for piano on Unicorn-Kanchana in 1986), as well as Arditti Quartet member and AMM occasional collaborator Rohan de Saram.

Other members between 1974 and 1984 have included soprano Margaret Field, John Mayer (tampura), Alexander Bălănescu (violin), James Wood (percussion), Schaun Tozer (pianist, composer, member of The Lost Jockey with Andrew Poppy), Mark Lockett (pianist, member of the English Gamelan Orchestra), composer Rich Bamford on percussion, as well as Dick Owen and Ian Mitchell.

== Repertoire ==
Dreamtiger premiered several important works by avantgarde composers like Iannis Xenakis (UK premiere of Psappha, 1975, and Kottos, 1977), Salvatore Sciarrino (European premiere of Ai Limiti Della Notte, for cello, 1979), Henri Pousseur (world premiere of Racine 19e de 8/4, for cello, 1976) or Christian Wolff (world premiere of Stardust Pieces, for cello and piano, 1980). Their repertoire included more than 70 different composers, some closely associated with the Ensemble, like John Cage, Charles Ives, George Crumb, John Foulds, Giacinto Scelsi, Luigi Dallapiccola or Toru Takemitsu.

== Dreamtiger and the Orient ==
Dreamtiger toured extensively in the UK in the early 1980s, as well playing Stuttgart's Hospitalhof, West Germany, in 1982. Their 1980 UK tour, organised by the Arts Council and Contemporary Music Network, met with great audience success and critical appraise, with a program comprising Maurice Ravel, Olivier Messiaen, Colin McPhee, George Crumb, Douglas Young, Xenakis and Toshiro Mayuzumi, prefaced by Rohan de Saram's demonstration of traditional Kandyan drums from his native Sri Lanka.

Douglas Young mentions two influences to explain his fascination for the Orient: Benjamin Britten's compositions The Prince of the Pagodas (1957) and Curlew River (1964), the latter inspired by the Sumidagawa Noh play; and meeting with Sri Lankan cellist de Saram. Dreamtiger explored composers inspired by the Orient like Debussy, Britten, Foulds, Hovhaness, Mayer, McPhee, Messiaen, Scelsi, as well as Eastern composers like Nguyen Thien Dao, Halim El-Dabh, Chou Wen-chung, Younghi Pagh-Paan, Yūji Takahashi, Toru Takemitsu, Isang Yun, Toshiro Mayuzumi or Kazuo Fukushima.

The Ensemble apparently ceased activity after 1984, but Douglas Young's fascination with the Orient endured. In 1984, he published an article titled Colin McPhee's Music: from West to East, with an analysis of McPhee's Balinese Ceremonial Music, for two pianos (1934). In 1985, Young composed a piano piece inspired by McPhee and Eastern music, simply titled Bali. Dreamtiger's unique LP, East-West Encounters, published 1982, is based on their 1980 repertoire and is a collection of Eastern-influenced works by 20th-century composers, including Colin McPhee's Balinese Ceremonial Music (1934), Olivier Messiaen's Cantéyodjayâ (1948), George Crumb's Vox Balaenae (1971) and Douglas Young's Trajet/Inter/Lignes (1981).
