= Inadmissible Evidence (film) =

1968 British film by Anthony Page

- Theatrical Release Poster
- Directed by: Anthony Page
- Screenplay by: John Osborne
- Based on: Inadmissible Evidence by John Osborne
- Produced by: Ronald Kinnoch
- Starring: Nicol Williamson
- Cinematography: Ken Hodges; Tony Imi
- Edited by: Derek York
- Music by: Dudley Moore
- Production company: Woodfall Film Productions
- Distributed by: Paramount British Pictures
- Release date: 23 June 1968
- Running time: 94 minutes
- Country: United Kingdom
- Language: English

Inadmissible Evidence is a 1968 British drama film directed by Anthony Page and starring Nicol Williamson and Jill Bennett. John Osborne wrote the screenplay, adapting his own 1964 play Inadmissible Evidence. The film portrays the collapse of an angry but sad man who cannot maintain decent standards in his life and antagonises everybody. As with other Osborne plays, it is possible to see his descent as representative of his class, culture and nation.

== Plot ==
The film follows a couple of days in the life of Bill Maitland, a 39-year-old Englishman who is head of small law firm in London and is tortured by his inadequacies as a lawyer, as an employer, as a husband, as a father, as a friend (he has none) and as a lover (for though women succumb quickly to him, he cannot maintain a relationship). Punctuated by interior monologues and imagined scenes, it shows him being abandoned by everybody as they come to realise that they cannot rely on him.

He first loses his secretary and lover Shirley, who walks out of her job and his life. His chief clerk Hudson then reveals that he is off to join a rival firm, leaving only the trainee Jones, who scorns him. A client, Mrs Gamsey, leaves the office in tears and is unlikely to return. After a dinner party at which he gets drunk and insults her best friends, his wife Anna hits him and he leaves the marital home. His mistress Liz takes him in, getting insulted for her pains, and he then leaves her to sleep in the office.

A client (and former lover), Mrs Anderson, has a court hearing that morning at which his feeble defence will probably lose her the case. A new client, Mr Maples, distressed that Maitland seems to take no serious interest in his sad case, walks out in tears. His daughter Jane drops in at his request, only to leave after a tirade of insults. The receptionist Joy, who he has just started an affair with, coldly rejects him and leaves. Liz appears, looking for reconciliation, but after being brutally rejected leaves.

Haunted throughout by fears of being disqualified for malpractice, being arrested and held in jail, being tried in court, and dying and being cremated, now utterly alone in life he smashes a window and looks at the busy street below.

== Cast ==
- Nicol Williamson as William Henry Maitland
- Jill Bennett as Liz Eaves
- Peter Sallis as Wally Hudson
- Eileen Atkins as Shirley
- Isabel Dean as Mrs Garnsey
- Eleanor Fazan as Anna Maitland
- Ingrid Brett as Jane Maitland
- John Normington as John Montague Maples
- David Valla as Jones
- Gillian Hills as Joy
- John Savident as Mr Watson
- Hilary Hardiman as Mrs Watson
- June Brown as dinner guest
- Norma Shebbeare as dinner guest
- James Ottaway as dinner guest
- Ishaq Bux as Mr Gupta, dinner guest
- Alan Selwyn as plain clothes detective
- Martin Grace Ryan as plain clothes detective
- Lindsay Anderson as barrister
- Pamela Papworth as strip club dancer
- Clare Kelly as Mrs. Anderson
- Penny Bird as Sheila
- Patsy Huxter as Hilda Maples
- Rufus Dawson as Scott
- Stephen Martin as Peter
- Brian Cleaver as clerk of court of Old Bailey
- Joseph Tregonino as caretaker
- Reginald Peters as private agent
- Ron Clarke as man outside strip club
- Ann Lancaster as drinking club hostess
- Ellis Dale as priest at crematorium
- Debbie Jacobs as Maple's daughter
- Ellen Mann as Hudson's secretary
- Valerie Collier as Mrs Anderson's mother

== Production ==
Nicol Williamson sings two songs in the film: "Room 504" and "Moonlight Becomes You."

== Reception ==
=== Critical response ===
The Monthly Film Bulletin wrote: "The cumulative, physical impact of Nicol Williamson's monolithic stage performance is broken by the camera's mobility and by some obtrusively edited moments ... Despite its precisely detailed settings – the seamy office, the tiled lavatory – and the merits of Kenneth Hodges' austere and grainy photography, Inadmissible Evidence appears on the screen as a symbolic monologue weakened by its thin veneer of social realism and literal representation".

The New York Times wrote: "As a study of harrowing pressures that destroy a middle-aged, weak but complex human being, Inadmissible Evidence gives the satisfaction that comes from viewing a carefully crafted work ... Anthony Page, who directed the play, gives the movie's principals the focus they need. Under his guidance they act and talk like people, not puppets. Of course, Mr. Williamson does most of it with shattering constancy and reality".

Variety wrote: "As a play, the best thing about Inadmissible Evidence was Nicol Williamson, who brought to life the tormented, mediocre, bullying coward that John Osborne had conceived on paper. Same holds true for the screen version in which same actor appears. There is value and insight to the film. Yet much of it is opaque and confusing. Evidence remains primarily a play".

Time Out wrote: "The main problem is the intrusive camera/editing style which reduces the original lengthy diatribes to tetchy little snippets, simultaneously cutting Osborne's magnificently theatrical anti-hero down to size: instead of being effectively inside a man's mind, we are now left outside, wondering why we should be expected to sympathise with such an unprepossessing, self-centred bore".

The Radio Times Guide to Films gave the film three stars out of five, writing: "Nicol Williamson re-creates his role from John Osborne's stage play as the solicitor who fears he's being persecuted by everyone. The fact that he treats his wife (Eleanor Fazan), mistress (Jill Bennett) and colleagues with equal contempt seems to have escaped him. Williamson's tour de force of invective loses some of its impact on screen as director Anthony Page presents the speeches in fragmented form".

Leslie Halliwell said: "Interesting and surprisingly successful transcription of a difficult play which was virtually an anti-humanity soliloquy".

=== Accolades ===
Nicol Williamson was nominated for a BAFTA Award for Best Actor in a Leading Role.

== Bibliography ==
- Murphy, Robert. Sixties British Cinema. British Film Industry, 1992.
