= Anthony Page =

British stage and film director (1935–2026)

Anthony Frederick Montague Page (21 September 1935 – 11 September 2026) was a British stage and film director.

== Life and career ==
Page was born in Bangalore, Kingdom of Mysore, India on 21 September 1935.

When Page was 19, he went to Canada on a free passage with the Royal Canadian Air Force and hitchhiked to New York where he studied with Sanford Meisner at the Neighborhood Playhouse School. In 1964, he took over directing at the Royal Court when George Devine fell ill. He directed Inadmissible Evidence with Nicol Williamson.

He won the Tony Award for Best Direction of a Play in 1997 for A Doll's House.

Page's 40-year relationship with artist Kenneth Butler was formalised by a civil partnership in 2006 and a marriage in 2014. Page died at Denville Hall in London on 11 September 2026, aged 90.

== Filmography ==
- Inadmissible Evidence (1968)
- Male of the Species (1969)
- Pueblo (1973)
- The Missiles of October (1974)
- F. Scott Fitzgerald in Hollywood (1975)
- Collision Course: Truman vs. MacArthur (1976)
- I Never Promised You a Rose Garden (1977)
- Absolution (1978)
- The Lady Vanishes (1979)
- F.D.R.: The Last Year (1980)
- Bill (1981)
- Johnny Belinda (1982)
- Grace Kelly (1983)
- Bill: On His Own (1983)
- Forbidden (1984)
- Murder: By Reason of Insanity (1985)
- Second Serve (1986)
- Monte Carlo (1986) (TV miniseries)
- Pack of Lies (1987)
- Scandal in a Small Town (1988)
- The Nightmare Years (1989) (TV miniseries)
- Chernobyl: The Final Warning (1991)
- Silent Cries (1993)
- Middlemarch (1994)
- Human Bomb (1998)
- My Zinc Bed (2008)

== Select theatre credits ==
- Inadmissible Evidence (1965-66) - Broadway
- Heartbreak House (1983-84) - Broadway
- A Doll's House (1997) - Broadway
- Cat on a Hot Tin Roof (2003-04) - Broadway
- Who's Afraid of Virginia Woolf? (2005)- Broadway
- Waiting for Godot (2009) - Broadway
