= Les noces =

Ballet by Igor Stravinsky

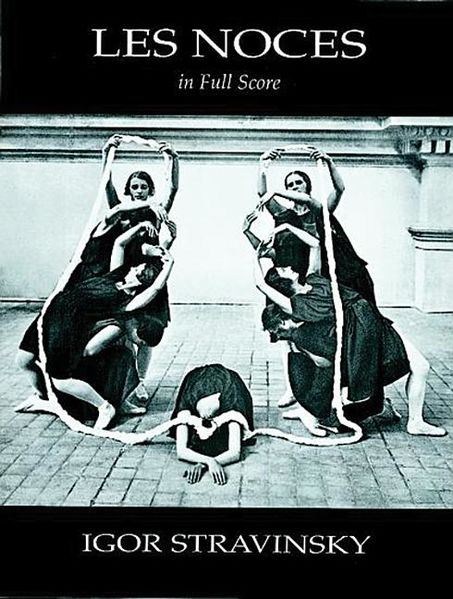
- Choreographer: Bronislava Nijinska
- Music: Igor Stravinsky
- Based on: Russian peasant wedding
- Premiere: 13 June 1923; Théâtre de la Gaîté, Paris
- Original ballet company: Ballets Russes
- Design: Natalia Goncharova
- Type: ballet-cantata

Les noces (The Wedding, or Svadebka (Russian: Свадебка)), is a Russian-language ballet-cantata by Igor Stravinsky scored unusually for four vocal soloists, chorus, percussion and four pianos. Dedicating the work to impresario Sergei Diaghilev, the composer described it in French as "choreographed Russian scenes with singing and music" [sic], and it remains known by its French name of Les noces despite being Russian.

Les noces was completed in 1917 but was then subjected to a series of changes of heart by Stravinsky regarding its scoring; he settled on the above forces only in 1923, in time for the premiere in Paris on 13 June that year under conductor Ernest Ansermet and danced by the Ballets Russes to choreography by Bronislava Nijinska. Several versions of the score have been performed over the years, substituting an orchestra for the percussion and pianos or using pianolas in accordance with a version Stravinsky abandoned.

== Composition ==
Stravinsky conceived of Les noces in 1913. By October 1917 he had completed it in short score to a libretto he himself had written using Russian wedding lyrics taken mainly from songs collected by Pyotr Kireevsky and published in 1911.

During this long gestation its orchestration changed dramatically. Stravinsky at first planned to use forces similar to those of The Rite of Spring. A later idea was to use synchronised roll-operated instruments, including the pianola; this he abandoned when partially completed because the Paris firm of Pleyel et Cie was late in constructing the two-keyboard cimbaloms, later known as luthéals, he required. (Note: The idea that it is impossible or difficult to synchronise a pianola with other instruments is erroneous. There have been hundreds of concerts in which the pianola has accompanied chamber music or been used as the solo instrument in concertos, beginning in 1900, when Luigi Kunits, concertmaster of the Pittsburgh Symphony Orchestra, was accompanied by pianolist Charles Parkyn. One example is the Rachmaninoff Third Piano Concerto with the Flemish Radio Orchestra in Brussels, with newly arranged rolls perforated in March 2007.)

Stravinsky settled only in 1923, six years after his short score, on the following forces: soprano, mezzo-soprano, tenor and bass vocal soloists; mixed chorus; unpitched percussion; and pitched percussion, notably four pianos. The decision exemplified his growing penchant for stripped down, clear and mechanistic sound-groups in the decade after The Rite (although he was never again to produce such an extreme sonic effect solely with percussion).

He reminisced in 1962: "When I first played The Wedding to Diaghilev … he wept and said it was the most beautiful and most purely Russian creation of our [ballet company]. I think he did love The Wedding more than any other work of mine. That is why it is dedicated to him."

== Structure ==
The ballet-cantata has four scenes performed without a break:

Part 1
1	Коса	The Tresses (i.e. braiding of her hair)
2	У жениха	At the Groom's House
3	Проводы невесты	The Bride's Send-Off
Part 2
4	Красный стол	The Wedding Feast

== Performances ==
The work was premiered on 13 June 1923 at the Théâtre de la Gaîté in Paris, by the Ballets Russes with choreography by Bronislava Nijinska. The instrumental ensemble of four pianos and percussion was conducted by Ernest Ansermet. The work is usually performed in Russian or French; English translations are sometimes used, and Stravinsky used the English one on the recordings he conducted for Columbia Records in 1934 and 1959.

At the London premiere on 14 June 1926 at His Majesty's Theatre, the piano parts were played by composers Francis Poulenc, Georges Auric, Vittorio Rieti and Vernon Duke. When Stravinsky conducted a recording using the English libretto in 1959, the four pianists were composers Samuel Barber, Aaron Copland, Lukas Foss, and Roger Sessions. At a revival of the ballet in London's Covent Garden on 23 March 1962, four composers – John Gardner, Malcolm Williamson, Richard Rodney Bennett and Edmund Rubbra – played the piano parts.

The premiere of the 1919 version of Les Noces, with cimbaloms, harmonium, and pianola, took place in 1981 in Paris, conducted by Pierre Boulez.

The Los Angeles Philharmonic commissioned an arrangement by Steven Stucky for symphony orchestra and premiered it under the baton of Esa-Pekka Salonen on May 29, 2008, at Walt Disney Concert Hall. The arrangement retains Stravinsky's percussion parts while replacing the four pianos with a large orchestra.

The version including pianola that Stravinsky left unfinished was completed with permission from Stravinsky's heirs by the Dutch composer Theo Verbey and performed in the Netherlands in 2009.

A new version of Les noces was performed by the English National Ballet at Sadler's Wells in September 2023, choreographed by Andrea Miller.

Performed at Woolwich Works, 13 – 14 January 2024. London, England. One Hundred Years of Nijinska.

== Critical reception and legacy ==
Les Noces received a mixed reception to its early performances. While its premiere in Paris in 1923 was welcomed with enthusiasm, the London performance three years later received such a negative response from critics that, according to Eric Walter White, "The virulence of this attack so exasperated [the novelist] H. G. Wells that on June 18, 1926, he wrote an open letter." Wells' letter, quoted by White, said: "I do not know of any other ballet so interesting, so amusing, so fresh or nearly so exciting as Les Noces... That ballet is a rendering in sound and vision of the peasant soul, in its gravity, in its deliberate and simple-minded intricacy, in its subtly varied rhythms and deep undercurrents of excitement, that will astonish and delight every intelligent man or woman who goes to see it."

The pious reaction of Soviet critics such as Tikhon Khrennikov was no surprise: "In Petrushka and Les Noces Stravinsky, with Diaghilev's blessing, uses Russian folk customs in order to mock at them in the interests of European audiences, which he does by emphasizing Asiatic primitivism, coarseness, and animal instincts, and deliberately introducing sexual motives. Ancient folk melodies are intentionally distorted as if seen in a crooked mirror." However, in 1929, Boris Asafyev, a musicologist less inclined to stick to the "party line" made a shrewd prediction: "The young generation will find in the score of Noces an inexhaustible fountain of music and of new methods of musical formulation – a veritable primer of technical mastery."

The passage of time has indeed shown Les Noces to be one of Stravinsky's finest and most original achievements. Writing in 1988, Stephen Walsh said, "Although others among Stravinsky's theatre works have enjoyed greater prestige … The Wedding is in many respects the most radical, the most original and conceivably the greatest of them all."

Howard Goodall has pointed out the influence of the distinctive sonorities of Les Noces: "To other composers, though, as they gradually came across Les Noces, its peculiar faux-primitive, fierce sound proved irresistible... The sound world of Les Noces is, quite simply, the most imitated of all twentieth-century combinations outside the fields of jazz and popular music." Goodall lists composers that have fallen under its influence such as Orff, Bartók, Messiaen and many others, including film composers.

In her memoir of working as Stravinsky's agent during the final decade of his life, Lilian Libman recalls the composer's particular fondness for the work: "Still, did he have a favorite as a father has a favorite son?... I think it was Les Noces... It drew him, it would seem, as no other work of his had done. During the time I knew him, the mention of Les Noces never failed to produce the same smile with which he greeted those for whom he felt great affection."

== Notable recordings ==
- A 1934 recording conducted by Stravinsky using the English libretto has been reissued on CD by EMI as part of their "Composers in Person" series.
- Stravinsky conducted a second recording, also in English, in 1959, with soloists Mildred Allen (s); Regina Sarfaty (m-s); Loren Driscoll (t); Robert Oliver (b); American Concert Choir; pianists Samuel Barber, Aaron Copland, Lukas Foss, Roger Sessions; Columbia Percussion Ensemble; re-issued by Sony Classical in 2016.
- Robert Craft recorded the early versions of Les Noces in the early 1970s on a Columbia LP, with pianos instead of pianolas.
- BBC Radio 3's recommended recording is that made in 1990 by the Voronezh Chamber Choir, New London Chamber Choir, Ensemble, James Wood (director) Hyperion CDA 66410.
- Leonard Bernstein conducted the English Bach Festival Orchestra and Chorus on a recording for Deutsche Grammophon in 1977, with Martha Argerich, Krystian Zimerman, Cyprien Katsaris, and Homero Francesch as the pianists.
- Radio France recorded the work in 2011 on a SACD, with Virginie Pesch, Katalin Varkonyi, Pierre Vaello, and Vincent Menez; Percussions de l'Orchestre National de France & de la SMCQ de Montréal; Chœur de Radio France; René Bosc, conductor; Harmonia Mundi – Musicora; ASIN: B00699QPNM. This recording includes both the 1923 and the 1919 versions by Stravinsky, the latter featuring two cimbaloms, a harmonium and a pianola, instead of the four pianos.
- The Dmitri Pokrovsky Ensemble, a group specializing in traditional Russian folk music, recorded it for Nonesuch in 1994.

== Choreography ==
Bronislava Nijinska's choreographic interpretation of Les Noces has been called protofeminist. Les Noces deserts the upbeat nature of a typical wedding, and instead brings to life the restrictive nature of a woman's duty to marry. The dark and somber set provides the backdrop to the simple costuming and rigid movements. The individuality of the dancer is stripped away in Nijinska's choreography, therefore displaying actors on a predetermined path, as marriage was regarded as the way to maintain and grow the community. The choreography exudes symbolism as, huddled together, the women repeatedly strike the floor with their pointe shoes with rigid intensity, as if to tell the tale of their struggle and ultimate reverence. The Russian peasant culture and the dutifulness it evokes in its people is represented in Nijinska's piece.
