= Music in the Round =

Charitable organisation

Music in the Round is a charitable organisation based in Sheffield, UK that exists to promote the best in international chamber music and inspire audiences with the unique power and intensity of music played in an intimate setting.

The organisation was formed in 1984 by Peter Cropper, then the leader of Sheffield's world-renowned string quartet, The Lindsays. Following the retirement of The Lindsays in 2005, Music in the Round formed an 11-piece chamber music group Ensemble 360 to take up residency, which comprises a string quintet, wind quintet and piano.

Its home venue, Sheffield's Crucible Studio Theatre, is a wonderfully intimate 'in the round' space where it hosts Autumn and Spring series and the nine-day Sheffield Chamber Music Festival each year. Music in the Round also works in partnership with a number of venues in Barnsley, Doncaster and across England to help develop audiences for chamber music, reaching over 30,000 people each year.

Music in the Round believes music is for all so its programmes embrace a breadth of music, including world, folk and jazz alongside classical. It has worked with a variety of other art forms, artists and organisations including poet Ian McMillan, actors Samuel and Timothy West, composers Huw Watkins and Stephen Montague, choreographer Anna Olejnicki and local organisations such as Museums Sheffield, Flying Donkey, Opus Independents and Ignite Imaginations.

Music in the Round is committed to commissioning and presenting the work of living composers and less well-known repertoire alongside more familiar works. In 2011 it appointed Charlie Piper as its first Associate Composer. Since 2015 it has premiered the annual Royal Philharmonic Society Chamber Music composition. It is also one of the few organisations in the country to have a Children's Composer-in-Residence, Paul Rissmann.

It has an innovative Learning & Participation] programme that delivers activity for all ages and levels of ability. Reaching 10,000 people aged 0-19 each year, it includes a unique brand of children's concerts that play to sell-out audiences across England, regularly run schools’ workshops, performance and composition classes, Early Years workshops, concert opportunities for young performers, workshops for local musicians, talks, symposiums, masterclasses and more. Regularly collaborating with Sheffield Music Hub and Sheffield Music Academy, in 2019 it led a hugely successful project, 'Schubert in Schools', with renowned baritone Roderick Williams, its singer-in-residence, to hundreds of KS3 pupils around the country.
