= Sandro Ivo Bartoli =

Italian pianist (born 1970)

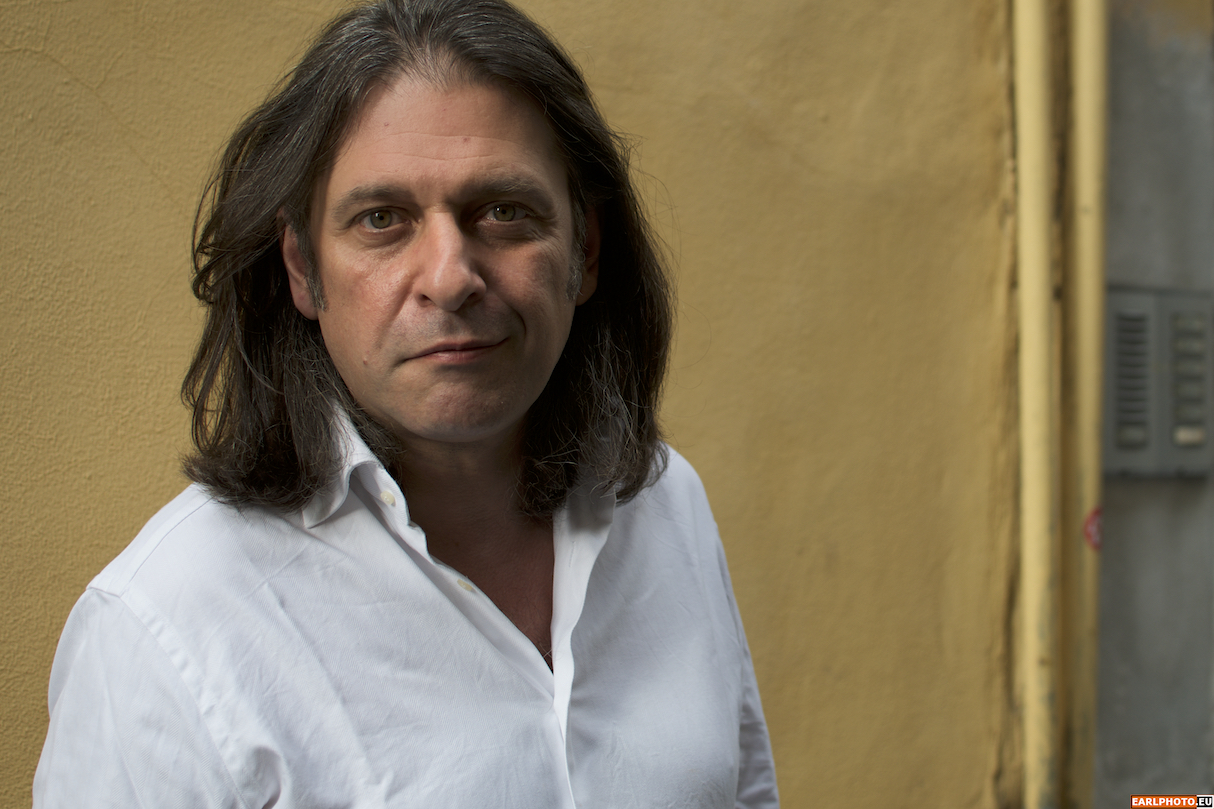

Background information
- Born: 10 February 1970 (age 56); Pisa, Italy
- Genres: Classical
- Occupation: Musician
- Instrument: Piano
- Website: sandroivobartoli.com

Sandro Ivo Bartoli (born 10 February 1970 in Pisa) is an Italian pianist.

== Early career ==
From the early 1990s, Bartoli has rediscovered, played and recorded Italian classical music from the early twentieth century, leading a fashion. His performance of the concertos of Respighi (Bedford, 1991), Malipiero (London, 1994) and Casella (1995), was followed by the first modern production in the United States of Ottorino Respighi's Toccata for piano and orchestra, with the Johnson City Symphony under Lewis Dalvit which was broadcast live by PBS and added to PBS' Great Performances series. After this success, Bartoli signed his first recording contract, with ASV, for an album of the piano works of Malipiero, and, the following year, a recording of music by Casella.

In 1997, he performed in Sweden, then Norway with concerts at the Bergen festival and the Grieg Museum. He joined with Italian composer Antonio Tabucchi, for a production at the Centre Georges Pompidou in Paris and then the Festival of Aix-en-Provence to a positive reception. In 2000, he performed in Germany, where his interpretation of Beethoven's Emperor Concerto was acclaimed ("such a performance of the Emperor concerto had not been heard for more than a decade" wrote the Thüringer Allgemeine), then he went to the UK, where he played Rachmaninoff's Paganini Rhapsody with The Hallé under Nicolae Moldoveanu.

== Later career ==
In 2002, Bartoli produced the music for Fernando Pessoa's Book of disquiet, at the Festival d'Avignon in "Antonio Tabucchi", and was pianist, arranger and composer. That year, in London, he created "Opera Etcetera" a program of concerts of the non-vocal music of opera composers, and then the Lyric Club Renato Bruson of Turin awarded him the Gina Rosso Prize for his work in the arts. He then performed Shostakovich's First Concerto in Stockholm, Rachmaninoff's Third Concerto in London, Beethoven's Third Concerto in Bedford, and a series of live broadcast concerts for the Spanish National Radio including works by Malipiero, Casella, Respighi, Pizzetti, the new Sonata of Luciano Berio and the Fantasia contrappuntistica of Ferruccio Busoni.

In 2005, Bartoli performed in a benefit concert at Munich's Philharmonie with Martha Argerich and Rodion Shchedrin, and accomplished the world premiere recording of Malipiero's piano concertos with the Radio Symphony Orchestra of Saarbruecken under Michele Carulli for CPO, which was the basis of a documentary film by the French director Miroslav Sebestik, titled "Pianiste-Interpréte", released in 2014. The double CD received a Diapason D'Or/Découvert award in France.

More recently, Bartoli has been involved in a project to bring back to public attention the historic opera houses of Italy. His 2008 tour In Tuscany of Chopin met with praise from critics, and earned him a public commendation from the Tuscan Minister of Culture.

In 2010, he performed Ottorino Respighi's Concerto in the myxolydian mode with the Orchestra of the Landesbühnen Sachsen in Dresden followed by Beethoven's Fourth Piano concerto with the Teschenphilharmonie in Munich and Chopin's Second Piano Concerto in Grosseto. The following year, Bartoli recorded Ottorino Respighi's Concerto in modo misolidio and Toccata for piano and orchestra with the Landesbühnen Sachsen under Michele Carulli for the Dutch label Brilliant Classics, beginning an artistic partnership with the label that has since seen the release of six albums with a diverse repertoire spanning from Busoni's Fantasia Contrappuntistica to an album devoted to Frescobaldi (The Frescobaldi Legacy - 5 De Diapason 2013), and encompassing the Liszt-Busoni transcriptions and the complete Bach-Busoni transcriptions.

== Discography ==
- Malipiero: Piano Music - ASV, September 1995
- Casella: Piano Music - ASV, 17 March 1998
- Saint-Saëns: Carnival of the Animals - Neos, 2003
- Encores - Opera Etcetera, 2004
- Fugitives - Timbre, 21 February 2005
- Malipiero: Piano Concertos, Variazioni Senza Tema (2-CD set). Radio Orchestra of Saarbruecken, M. Carulli. CPO, 2007.
- Chopin Brillante - Fenice DM, 2008
- Liszt-Busoni: Piano transcriptions (Paganini Etudes, Mephisto Waltz, Hungarian Rhapsody No.19, Fantasy and Fugue on Ád nos ad salutarem undam. Brilliant Classics, 2011.
- Respighi: Concerto in modo misolido, Toccata. State Orchestra of Saxony, Michele Carulli. Brilliant Classics, 2011.
- Busoni: Fantasia Contrappuntistica, Seven Elegies. Brilliant Classics, 2011.
- Lotichius: Piano Concerto No.1. St. Petersburg Academic Symphony Orchestra, Vladimir Lande. Navona, 2013.
- The Frescobaldi Legacy: transcriptions and original works by Respighi, Bartòk, feinberg, Ligeti, Reicha, Bauer. Brilliant Classics, 2013.
- Bach-Busoni: The complete transcriptions (2-CD set). Brilliant Classics, 2014.
- Liszt: The Franciscan Works. Solaire Records, 2015
- Johann Sebastian Bach: Preludes, Fantasias and Minuets. Solaire Records, 2017
