= Argo Records (UK) =

British record label

- Parent company: Universal Music Group
- Founded: 1951
- Founder: Harley Usill; Cyril Clarke
- Distributor: Decca Records
- Genre: Classical, jazz, folk, world, spoken word
- Country of origin: UK

Argo Records is a record label founded by Harley Usill and Cyril Clarke in 1951 with the intention of recording "British music played by British artists", but the company's releases expanded to include spoken word recordings and other projects.

== Genres ==
Argo's first issue, Music from Bali, was dedicated to the Indonesian gamelan (ensemble) recorded at the Winter Garden Theatre, London. The catalogue eventually ran to 1,000 items.

In 1953, Usill was introduced to Indian musician Deben Bhattacharya, who was responsible for field recordings of traditional music in India. Bhattacharya had been frustrated by the absence of recordings he could use for his BBC Radio broadcasts. Around the same time, Walter Harris recorded an amateur Brazilian choir in Rio de Janeiro. Such recordings as these appeared in the labels "Living Traditions" series.

Taking advantage of the capacity of the longer playing time of LP records, Argo embarked on recording the complete works of William Shakespeare. Cambridge University's Marlowe Players participated in the series, which was the responsibility of Dadie Rylands, a fellow at King's College, Cambridge. Recording began in 1957 and was completed by 1964. Initially professional actors had been reluctant to work for the project, but in time Judi Dench, Derek Jacobi and Prunella Scales participated.

"The Poet Speaks" series consisted of contemporary poets reading their work. It included Ted Hughes, Sylvia Plath, and Anthony Thwaite. In 1954, the company recorded the Festival of Lessons and Carols (Christmas) service at King's College, Cambridge, a venue where the acoustics had previously defeated the abilities of engineers at other companies. A series of the masses of Joseph Haydn, initially recorded at the same venue, commenced in 1960, though after the first release with the London Symphony Orchestra, later recordings were made with the Choir of St John's College, Cambridge and the Academy of St Martin in the Fields under George Guest. One of their biggest sellers was Under Milk Wood featuring Richard Burton in the BBC production of Dylan Thomas' radio drama.

== Bought by Decca ==
Argo was bought by British Decca in 1957. Usill remained in charge and the company was able to maintain autonomy from the parent company.

The company at this time recorded dramatised versions of Alice in Wonderland (1958) and Through the Looking-Glass, both directed by Douglas Cleverdon and both starring Jane Asher in the title role, with actors Tony Church, Norman Shelley, and Carleton Hobbs, with Margaretta Scott as the narrator; and The Wind in the Willows (1960), adapted and produced by Toby Robertson, with Richard Goolden as Mole, Frank Duncan as Rat, Tony Church as Badger, and Norman Shelley as Toad, with Patrick Wymark as the narrator. Another significant recording from this era is the premiere recording of Benjamin Britten's one-act opera/miracle play for children, Noye's Fludde (1961).

A series of recordings of steam locomotives (then in the early stages of being phased out in the UK) was masterminded by the film sound recordist and mixer Peter Handford, selling up to 30–40,000 copies per year under the name Transacord. It also did some other unusual pressings such as London's Last Trams using early amateur mobile sound recorders.

The repertoire diversified into modern British jazz through the poetry and jazz movement of the early 1960s. This meant that recordings by pianist Michael Garrick were particularly well represented. The radio ballads of Ewan MacColl and Peggy Seeger, originally produced by BBC Radio (1958–64), were leased and issued by Argo from 1965. MacColl and Seeger also issued a 12-volume series of LPs called The Long Harvest, which featured variant British and U.S. versions of traditional ballads from the collection of Francis James Child. A small cluster of folk artists joined the label around this time, including Tom Paley (with his New Deal String Band), the Druids, the Clutha, the Songwainers, and the Garret Singers.

In the 1970s, Decca extended their children's audiobook series the Railway Stories on the Argo label, with six further books (3 LPs) narrated by William Rushton. In 1974, they produced an abridged, dramatic version of The Hobbit, read by Nicol Williamson, and released the soundtrack to the film Tarka the Otter (1979), which featured Peter Ustinov's narration and David Fanshawe's music score.

The label passed to PolyGram when the conglomerate acquired British Decca in 1980. Harley Usill left the company and co-founded ASV Records. Argo as an independent entity ceased in 1988.

== Argo relaunches ==
The label was relaunched in 1990 as an imprint of Decca with the intent to concentrate on choral, organ, and British and American classical music. Releases continued throughout the 1990s. The most recent release was in 1998.

After more than 20 years of dormancy, Decca announced that it revived Argo in July 2020 after partnering with HarperCollins's imprint William Collins to release certain spoken word recordings, recently unearthed from the label's archives, digitally for the first time.

The audio books (in cassette and CD form) continue in the Argo name but under a different logo.

The Argo catalogue is now controlled by Universal Music Group.

== See also ==
- Lists of record labels
- Olga Lehmann record sleeve designs
