= Ensemble 360 =

Ensemble 360 is a British chamber music ensemble founded in 2005 by Music in the Round following the retirement of the Lindsay String Quartet. It comprises five string players, five wind players, and a pianist, and as often as possible presents concerts 'in the round', a performance style which is characteristic of its home venue, the Crucible Studio in Sheffield, England.

Ensemble 360 is a strong team and a group of friends who share a passion for the music, and this radiates through each performance. Their enthusiasm, drive and musicality draw audiences into their performances both through the quality of their playing and their engaging spoken introductions.

Regular guests on BBC Radio 3 and at some of the largest festivals and venues in England, with Music in the Round Ensemble 360 also tours across the country, has its own concert series in Barnsley and Doncaster, and invites other international artists to Sheffield to perform in Music in the Round’s nine-day May Festival and Autumn and Spring series.

Together with Music in the Round and Polly Ives, Ensemble 360 has established a unique brand of children’s concerts that play to sell-out audiences across England. They have premiered two commissions from Music in the Round’s Children’s Composer in Residence Paul Rissmann, whose unique musical stories combine participation and narration. The Ensemble regularly runs schools’ workshops, as well as performance and composition classes with a variety of age groups, and is the Ensemble in Residence at both Sheffield University and the University of Huddersfield.

They also enjoy collaboration and have worked with a variety of other organisations and artists including poet Ian McMillan, actors Samuel and Timothy West, composer Huw Watkins and Museums Sheffield. From 2012-15, Music in the Round's Associate Composer was Charlie Piper.

== Discography ==
- Mozart: Flute Quartet No. 1 in D major, K285; Adagio for Cor Anglais and String Trio (K580a); Quintet for Piano and Winds in E flat, K452; Clarinet Quintet in A major, K581 (ASV Gold; GLD4022), honoured as BBC Music Magazine's "Chamber Choice" in January 2007
- Spohr: Nonet in F major, Op. 31; Septet in A minor Op. 147 (ASV Gold; GLD4026)
- Beethoven: Septet in E flat major, Op. 20; Serenade in D major for Flute, Violin and Viola, Op. 25 (Nimbus Alliance; NI6112)
- Poulenc: Music for Piano and Wind (Nimbus Alliance; NI6121) featuring Flute Sonata, Op. 164; Trio, Op. 43; Clarinet Sonata, Op. 184; Sextet for piano and wind quintet, Op. 100; Oboe Sonata, Op. 185
