= Theo Verbey =

Dutch composer (1959–2019)

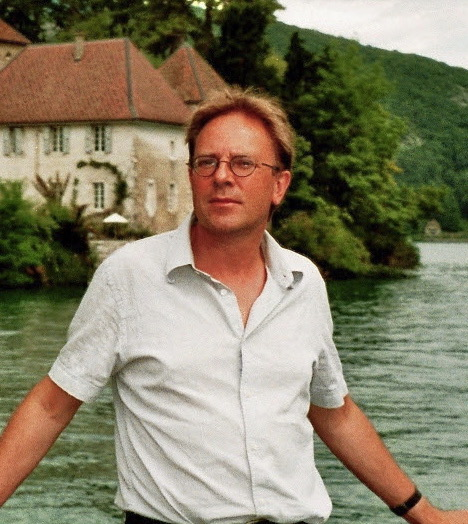
Theo Verbey

Theo Verbey (5 July 1959 – 13 October 2019) was a Dutch composer. His style could be considered to be associated with Postmodern music. Verbey was also orchestrated Alban Berg's Piano Sonata, Op. 1 in 1984 while still a student.

== Biography ==
His earliest musical memories were of singing nursery rhymes with one of his numerous aunts. He later began playing the recorder and singing in the boys’ choir of his grammar school. He started composing music at the age of seven, writing small pieces for his school orchestra. While in high school, he also wrote some pop songs as well as music for a jazz/rock band of which he was a member.

He studied at the Royal Conservatory of The Hague where he graduated in 1986. His principal composition teachers were Peter Schat and Jan van Vlijmen. Upon completing his studies Verbey rapidly became one of the most performed living Dutch composers. In 1987 he was awarded the Amsterdam Arts Fund's incentive award for young composers, and since received commissions from the Royal Concertgebouw Orchestra, Amsterdam Sinfonietta, the London Sinfonietta, the Residentie Orchestra, the Dutch Radio Filharmonisch Orkest and the Dutch Radio Chamber Orchestra, Klangforum Wien, the Deutsche Oper Berlin and many others. Theo Verbey taught at both the Royal Conservatory of The Hague and the Conservatorium van Amsterdam, as well as having been on the composition jury for the Queen Elisabeth Music Competition in Brussels in 1992 and 1997. His work shows high regard for structure, beauty, and a great historical awareness, as well as a special regard for instrumental color and subtle harmonies. Verbey was a member of a reading club devoted to the study of contemporary thought.

== Projects ==
Later commissions included Traurig wie der Tod, a work for orchestra and chorus premiered by the Netherlands Radio Filharmonisch Orkest and the Netherlands Radio Choir, conducted by James Gaffigan, as well as Lumen ad Finem Cuniculi, written for philharmonie zuidnederland and conducted by Dmitri Liss. The Brodsky Quartet commissioned Verbey to provide a segment for their celebrated song cycle, Trees, Walls, Cities. Verbey composed 4 Preludes to Infinity for The Stolz Quartet, a work which is included on their CD, Dutch Masters and Their Inspiration. More recently, the duo Andrea Vasi & Sebastiaan Kemner performed Ballade, a work for trombone and piano written especially for them.

In 2007, Theo Verbey completed his second commission for the Royal Concertgebouw Orchestra: LIED, for Trombone and Orchestra, with Jörgen van Rijen as soloist. His Fractal Symphony was chosen by choreographer Regina van Berkel as music to accompany her ballet Memory of a Shape performed by Ballet Mainz in 2009. Van Berkel also based a second ballet based on Verbey's music, which was performed by the ballet company of the Deutsche Oper am Rhein in February/March 2011 under the title Frozen Echo. Memory of a Shape received its Dutch premiere in 2017, when it was performed by Introdans. In November 2010, Theo Verbey's piece Bandersnatch for cello and pianola was premiered by Larissa Groeneveld as part of the Amsterdam Cello Biënnale. It was Mr. Verbey's second commission for the Biënnale.

In 2009/2010, Theo Verbey was Composer-in-Residence of the Brabant Philharmonic Orchestra, based in Eindhoven, the Netherlands. In celebration of that orchestra’s 60th jubilee, Verbey was commissioned to compose Orchestral Variations which showcases each section of the orchestra both individually and within the ensemble.

Verbey also collaborated with Klangforum Wien on their Free Radicals program, providing a score for Man Ray's 1923 film, Retour à la Raison. This was not Theo Verbey's first contact with the medium of film: in 1994, film maker Alejandro Agresti used Verbey's piece TEGENBEWEGING as the basis of his short film which formed a segment of Hexagon, a film project made for the Holland Festival.

In addition to composing his own works, Theo Verbey earned high regard for his orchestrations. One of his earliest successes, Alban Berg's Piano Sonata, Op. 1, has been performed many times by the Royal Concertgebouw Orchestra, among others. Other orchestrations included an arrangement of Leoš Janáček's piano sonata 1. X. 1905. In 2006 Theo Verbey was asked by Amsterdam Sinfonietta to arrange the three remaining movements of Alban Berg's Lyric Suite for string orchestra. At the invitation of ECHO (European Concert Hall Organization) this version of the Lyric Suite was included in Amsterdam Sinfonietta's successful 2011 tour of six major European cities. Mr. Verbey was granted permission by the heirs of Igor Stravinsky to complete the orchestration of the unfinished 1919 version of Les noces for voices, pianola, 2 cimbaloms, harmonium and percussion. This version has been so successful that Queen Beatrix of the Netherlands chose it for her annual Queen's Day Concert in her palace in The Hague. Verbey also orchestrated three Mussorgsky song cycles (Sunless, the Nursery, and Songs and Dances of Death), which are regularly performed. He also arranged Scriabin's Preludes op. 33, as well as Three Choral Preludes by J.S. Bach for oboe, violin, viola and cello.

=== Educational activities ===
Theo worked at the Royal Conservatory of The Hague since 1984 as a teacher of Music Theory, where he was known as an intelligent and dedicated teacher with a strong commitment to the education of young musicians. In 1995, he joined the faculty of the Conservatorium van Amsterdam, as well.

As a teacher, Verbey was known for his extensive knowledge of the history and development of the art of instrumentation, as well as his precise arrangements and orchestrations. He was devoted to teaching, and took his obligation extremely seriously. He would work out his own solution to every orchestration assignment, so his students could look over his shoulder, as it were. Theo Verbey was held in high esteem by his colleagues, and there was no dispute about his authority as a theorist and orchestrator. He was also known for his kind and considerate approach to students outside the classroom. He demonstrated a similar regard for his colleagues, always being well informed and utterly professional. As a composer, he belonged to a dying species, the "composer-theorist." In the Netherlands, he represented one of the few remaining links between the two disciplines, which have been bound together throughout the history of music.

== Theo Verbey Foundation ==
In September 2020, the non-profit Theo Verbey Foundation was established to honour Theo’s artistic legacy by serving as a platform to preserve and distribute his work. By building a network of people who were connected with Theo, the foundation hopes to create a space in which people who knew Theo and loved his music can feel at home. The foundation collects, organizes, preserves, makes accessible and helps publish Theo’s teaching materials, scores, and performance recordings, and has also consulted with specialized institutions in the Netherlands and abroad to professionalize its activities in areas such as archiving, preservation, management and providing access. The Theo Verbey Foundation is a non-profit organization. The foundation’s board is made up of people whose lives were touched by Theo, and board members receive no remuneration; all funds received go directly to fulfilling the foundation’s objectives.

== Works ==
=== Orchestra/Large Ensemble ===
- 2019 Ariadne for large orchestra, commissioned by the Royal Concertgebouw Orchestra
- 2017-18 After the Great War for large orchestra, written to mark the ending of World War I, commissioned by the Tampere Philharmonic Orchestra and the Residentie Orchestra
- 2015 Lumen Ad Finem Cuniculi for large orchestra, written to commemorate the end in 1976 of coal Mining in Limburg
- 2009 Orchestral Variations for large orchestra
- 2009 Frozen Echo for large orchestra, a ballet version of Schaduw (Shadow) arranged by the composer for choreographer Regina van Berkel for her ballet of the same name
- 2009 Tractus for cimbalom, harmonium and strings
- 2008 Inquietus for large orchestra
- 2008 No Comment ringtone for orchestra
- 2008 Invitation to a Beheading for orchestra inspired by the book, Invitation to a Beheading by Vladimir Nabokov
- 2007 Man Ray, le Retour à la Raison for ensemble
- 2005 Fractal variations for string orchestra
- 2004 Fractal symphony for orchestra
- 2002 Schaduw (Shadow) for string quartet, string orchestra and percussion instruments
- 2000 Ouverture (Suite) in G in the style of Johann Sebastian Bach, after BWV 1066, for large ensemble. Written in honor of the 250th anniversary of Bach's death. From the collection entitled Orchesterübung - Bearbeitungen und stilkopien nach J.S. Bach (Orchestral exercise - arrangements and style copies after J.S. Bach)
- 2000 Ouverture (Suite) in D in the style of Johann Sebastian Bach, after BWV 1068, for large ensemble. Written in honor of the 250th anniversary of Bach's death. From the collection entitled Orchesterübung - Bearbeitungen und stilkopien nach J.S. Bach (Orchestral exercise - arrangements and style copies after J.S. Bach)
- 1997 Alliage for large orchestra
- 1996 Conciso for orchestra
- 1992 Produkt for chamber ensemble
- 1991, rev. 1994 Triade for orchestra
- 1989 De Simorq for chamber orchestra
- 1988, rev. 1990 Expulsie (parts I/IV), for large ensemble
- 1986 Tegenbeweging (Contrary Motion) for orchestra
- 1985, rev. 1989 Aura for large ensemble
- 1985 Random symphonies electronic music
- 1976 Caprice symphonique for orchestra

=== Vocal ===
- 2015 Traurig wie der Tod for choir and orchestra based on poems by Hans Bethge (poet)
- 2012 Der Garten des Paracelsus (In the Garden of Paracelsus) for soprano and string quartet, text by Peter Huchel, commissioned by the Brodsky Quartet
- 2007-2012 Twee Gedichten van Bloem (Two poems of Bloem) for mixed choir, a cappella (1-Na de Bevrijding; 2-Geluk) based on poems by Dutch poet Jakobus Cornelis (Jacques) Bloem and commissioned by The National Committee for 4 and 5 May
- 2007 Twee Gedichten van Bloem (Two poems of Bloem) for 4 part female choir, a cappella (1-Na de Bevrijding; 2-Geluk) based on poems by Dutch poet Jakobus Cornelis (Jacques) Bloem and commissioned by The National Committee for 4 and 5 May
- 1998 Sechs Rilke-Lieder for baritone and piano, based on poems by Rainer Maria Rilke
- 1998 Sechs Rilke-Lieder for baritone and orchestra, based on poems by Rainer Maria Rilke
- 1992 Whitman for soprano and orchestra, based on poems by Walt Whitman

=== Concerto ===
- 2007 LIED for trombone and orchestra, commissioned by the Royal Concertgebouw Orchestra with Jörgen van Rijen as soloist
- 2006 Piano Concerto for piano and orchestra
- 2005 Clarinet Concerto for clarinet and orchestra
- 1995 Notturno for oboe, 2 horns and strings
- 1995 Pavane oubliée for harp and strings

=== Solo and Chamber ===
- 2016 Ballade for trombone and piano
- 2013 4 preludes to Infinity for oboe, violin, viola and cello
- 2013 La Malinconia II for harp solo
- 2011 La Malinconia I for piano solo
- 2010 Bandersnatch for cello and pianola inspired by a character in Lewis Carroll's poem, Jabberwocky
- 2008 Graduale piano and electronics
- 2006 5 Pieces for violoncello solo
- 2006 Cadenza for Trumpet Concerto (Arutiunian), commissioned by Peter Masseurs, former principal trumpet player of the Concertgebouworkest.
- 2004 Perplex for 6 instruments
- 2001, rev. 2004 Spring Rain for string quartet
- 1999 Trio for violin, cello and piano
- 1999 Sospeso for percussion ensemble
- 1998 Fandango for recorder quartet
- 1998 Sestetto for flute, harp and string quartet
- 1995 Hommage II for viola
- 1993 Hammage for flute
- 1992 Duet for two trumpets
- 1991, rev. 1994 Passamezzo for saxophone quartet
- 1990 De Peryton for 7 wind instruments inspired by Jorge Luis Borges the Peryton
- 1988, rev. 1997 Chaconne, for string trio
- 1987 Inversie, for 10 instruments
- 1987 Contractie for flute, bass clarinet and piano
- 1982 Triplum for 12 wind instruments
- 1980 Nocturne, for piano
- 1976 Sonatine for bassoon and bass

=== Instrumentation ===
- 2018 Zwei letzte Lieder (1-Beim schlafengehen; 2-Im Abendrot) by Richard Strauss for countertenor and orchestra.
- 2017 Spring Waters op. 14 no. 1 by Sergei Rachmaninoff for voice and orchestra. Commissioned by the Concertgebouworkest, premiered by Eva-Maria Westbroek, soprano and Mariss Jansons, conductor.
- 2013 Drie Choralvorspiele (Chorale Preludes) by Johann Sebastian Bach for oboe, violin, viola and cello.
- 2011 Piano Preludes op. 33 by Alexander Scriabin for oboe, violin, viola and cello
- 2007 Sonata 1.x.1905 by Leoš Janáček
- 2007 Les Noces by Igor Stravinsky (1919 Version; Verbey completion) for solo voices, choir, pianola, harmonium, percussion
- 2006 Drei Stücke (No. 1,5,6) from Lyric Suite by Alban Berg for string orchestra
- 2005 Cantiones sacrae (Gesualdo) Completion of the missing bassus and sextus (sixth part)
- 2004 Une Larme by Modest Mussorgsky for string orchestra
- 2000 Italian Concerto, BWV 971 by Johann Sebastian Bach for solo violin, strings and continuo, in honor of the 250th anniversary of Bach's death; from the collection of pieces, Orchesterübung - Bearbeitungen und stilkopien nach J.S. Bach (Orchestral exercise - arrangements and style copies after J.S. Bach).
- 1994 Bez solnca (Without Sun) by Modest Mussorgsky, for voice and orchestra, based on texts by A.A. Golenishchev-Kutusov
- 1994 The Nursery by Modest Mussorgsky, for voice and orchestra
- 1994 Songs and Dances of Death by Modest Mussorgsky, for bass and chamber orchestra, based on texts by A.A. Golenishchev-Kutusov
- 1990 Trois Chansons (Ravel) for large ensemble
- 1990 Andante from Piano Sonata in A major no. 13 by Schubert for large orchestra
- 1990-2000 Ouverture in the French Style, BWV 831 by Johann Sebastian Bach for transverse flute, strings and continuo, in honor of the 250th anniversary of Bach's death; from the collection of pieces, Orchesterübung - Bearbeitungen und stilkopien nach J.S. Bach (Orchestral exercise - arrangements and style copies after J.S. Bach).
- 1984 Sonata opus 1 Piano Sonata (Berg) by Alban Berg
- 1983 Sonata opus 101 by Ludwig van Beethoven for string quartet
- 1983 Sonata for two pianos by Igor Stravinsky for flute, oboe, clarinet, bassoon, violin and cello
