= Harley Usill =

Harley John Vaughan Usill (13 July 1925 – 7 October 1991) was a British record company executive. With Cyril Clarke (father of James Kenelm Clarke) he was joint founder and managing director of British record label Argo Records.

== Early life and background ==
Usill was born at Portsmouth, the only son and elder child of Harley Verneau Usill (1898-1978), a director of the publishing firm Evans Brothers Ltd and later founder of Naldrett Press, who served as Mayor of Epsom and Ewell, Surrey in 1953 and also as a magistrate and alderman, and Marguerite Jeannie Vaughan Dorey (1898-1983). The Usill family were middle-class professionals; the elder Harley Usill- son of Battersea surveyor and civil engineer Harley Mackenzie Usill- was educated at St Lawrence College, Ramsgate, and had a University of Oxford Bachelor of Arts degree.

Usill was educated at the independent Epsom College.

== Career ==
After an extended period in various occupations, including working for his father's company and a period as assistant director to documentary maker Humphrey Jennings, Usill started Argo in 1951. The company was best-known for its spoken-word recordings, but released a wide range of material that also included classical, folk and jazz music, and even trackside recordings of steam trains by Peter Handford. Due to cash problems, the company was taken over by British Decca in 1957, though with Usill remaining as Managing Director, and being given pretty much full autonomy to run the record label as he wished.

After Argo's parent company was absorbed by Polygram in 1979, Usill ended his connection with Argo and established ASV (Academy Sound and Vision) the following year.

Usill had served in the Army from 1943, reaching the rank of captain by the time he left in 1947.

== Personal life ==
In 1955, Usill married Elizabeth Barry (died 1978); they had three children.
