= Peter Cropper =

British violinist (1945–2015)

Peter Cropper (19 November 1945 – 29 May 2015) was a British violinist, leader of the Lindsay String Quartet, and founding artistic director of Music in the Round, a charitable organisation he founded in the 1980s to promote chamber music concerts.

== Biography ==
Cropper was born in Southport, Lancashire, on 19 November 1945. His father Alfred Cropper was a chartered accountant and his mother was Edith Kathleen (Kate), née Hale. He gained a scholarship to Uppingham School in 1959 based on his musical ability. In 1963 he studied at the Royal Academy of Music.

He was married at Thornham Parva, Suffolk, on 19 December 1972 to violinist Nina Esmé Martin. He died, as a result of a heart attack, on 29 May 2015 in Sheffield.

== Career ==
While at the Royal Academy, Cropper formed the Cropper Quartet with Michael Adamson, Roger Bigley and Bernard Gregor-Smith. When they moved to Keele University, they renamed themselves the Lindsay String Quartet after Alexander Lindsay who was its first principal. In 1984, Cropper founded Music in the Round, which would promote chamber music around the UK. The Lindsays formed the core of Music in the Round's activity for over twenty years, until their retirement in 2005. By the time of their retirement, Music in the Round was the largest promoter of chamber music in the UK outside London.

A frequently told story about Cropper dates to 1981 when London's Royal Academy of Music lent him a 258 year old Stradivarius for a series of concerts. On the first night of the concert, Cropper tripped and broke the precious violin. Fortunately, a master craftsman was able to repair the violin which reportedly sounded even better after the repair.
