= Eleanor Fazan =

British choreographer and actress (1929–2024)

Eleanor Fazan OBE
- Born: Eleanor Henta Fazan; 29 May 1929; Colony and Protectorate of Kenya
- Died: 20 January 2024 (aged 94)
- Other names: Fiz
- Occupations: Actress, director, choreographer, dancer
- Years active: 1949–2012
- Spouse: Stanley Myers
- Children: 1

Eleanor Henta Fazan OBE (29 May 1929 – 20 January 2024) was a British actress, dancer, and choreographer. She is best known for her roles in productions: Willow, Hot Fuzz and Lassiter. Fazan was appointed Officer of the Order of the British Empire (OBE) in the 2013 New Year Honours for services to dance.

== Personal life ==
Eleanor Henta Fazan was born on 29 May 1929 in Kenya. She later trained in dancing with Sadler's Wells Ballet (currently known as 'The Royal Ballet'). Later she joined the Arts Educational School.

Fazan was married to the British composer Stanley Myers in 1955, and they had one son. She died on 20 January 2024, at the age of 94.

== Career ==
In 1959, Fazan directed One to Another, a revue at the Lyric Opera House in Hammersmith written by Bamber Gascoigne, John Cranko, John Mortimer, N. F. Simpson, and Harold Pinter, amongst others. It starred Beryl Reid, Patrick Wymark, Joe Melia Sheila Hancock and Ray Barrett. In 1960 she was choreographer for The Lily White Boys, directed by Lindsay Anderson at the Royal Court. In 1961 she was the director of Beyond the Fringe, when it began its initial London run at the Fortune Theatre. In 1974, she made her Royal Opera debut on Der Ring des Nibelungen, directed by Götz Friedrich. She did phenomenal work at the Royal Opera House, Covent Garden, where she contributed to numerous productions in the following years under the prominent directors Elijah Moshinski, John Copley, Friedrich and John Schlesinger in their productions of operas such as: Peter Grimes, Lohengrin, The Rake’s Progress, Macbeth, Samson, Otello, Attila, Ariadne auf Naxos, Semele, Idomeneo, re di Creta, Elektra, Les Contes d’Hoffmann and Der Rosenkavalier.

Meanwhile, she entered cinema as a choreographer as well as actress where she appeared in Oh! What a Lovely War, Heaven’s Gate, Willow, Cold Comfort Farm, Mrs Henderson Presents and Hot Fuzz. In 1993, she was awarded the Industry Award from British Film Institute.

== Partial filmography ==
Source: British Film Institute

Year	Film	Role	Genre
1950	Cinderella	Cast member	Film
1955	Value For Money	Leopard 'doll' in revue number (uncredited)	Film
1955	Two of a Kind	Betty	Film
1957	Pink Scarf	Mrs Ware	Film
1957	A Santa for Christmas	Dance direction	Film
1959	Follow a Star	Choreography	Film
1960	The Ladies' Man	Choreography	Film
1965	The Day of Ragnarok	Cast member	Film
1965	Scruggs	Cast member	Film
1965	The Intelligence Men	Cast member	Film
1968	Inadmissible Evidence	Anna Maitland	Film
1969	Oh! What a Lovely War	Choreography	Film
1972	Lady Caroline Film	Dance movement	Film
1973	O Lucky Man!	Cast member	Film
1973	Savage Messiah	Madame Gaudier	Film
1973	The Ruling Class	Choreographer	Film
1974	Barry McKenzie Holds His Own	Musical staging	Film
1974	Great Expectations	Choreographer	TV film
1977	Wombling Free	Choreographer	Film
1977	Joseph Andrews	Dances	Film
1978	The One and Only Phyllis Dixey	Musical numbers	TV film
1979	Yanks	Choreographer	Film
1980	Nearly a Happy Ending	Choreography	TV play
1980	Heaven's Gate	Choreography	Film
1981	A Midsummer Night's Dream	Choreography	Television
1982	The Scarlet Pimpernel	Choreographer	TV film
1984	Lassiter	Choreographer	Film
1984	A Christmas Carol	Choreographer	TV film
1985	King David	Choreography	Film
1986	Babes in Toyland	Choreography	TV film
1987	Top of the Bill	Choreography	Film
1988	Willow	Choreography	Film
1990	Mountains of the Moon	Choreography	Film
1991	Performance: "Absolute Hell"	Choreography	Television
1992	L'Amant	Choreography	Film
1994	The Innocent	Choreographer	Film
1995	Cold Comfort Farm	Choreography	Film
1999	Onegin	Choreographer	Film
2005	Mrs Henderson Presents	Choreography	Film
2007	Hot Fuzz	Choreographer	Film
