= Cantiones sacrae (Gesualdo) =

Compositions by Carlo Gesualdo

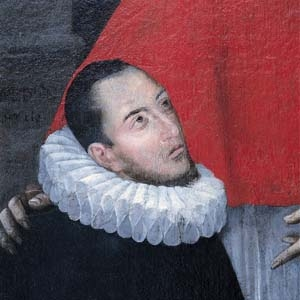
1609 donor portrait of Carlo Gesualdo from Il Perdono di Gesualdo

The Sacrae Cantiones of Carlo Gesualdo da Venosa are two collections of motets published in 1603. The first volume consists of 19 motets for 5 voices, the second volume of 20 motets for 6 or 7 voices. The bassus and sextus (sixth part) of the second volume are lost, but were reconstructed by musicologist James Wood from 2008 to 2011 and recorded by Wood's Vocalconsort Berlin in August 2011.

== Motet list ==
Sacrarum cantionum quinque vocibus Liber primus, Napoli, Costantino Vitale, 1603

1. O vos omnes
2. Domine, ne despicias deprecationem meam
3. Sancti Spiritus, Domine
4. Exaudi, Deus, deprecationem meam
5. Venit lumen tuum
6. Illumina faciem tuam
7. Maria, Mater gratiae
8. Precibus et meritis
9. Ave, dulcissima Maria
10. Dignare me laudare te
11. Ave Regina cœlorum
12. Hei mihi Domine
13. Tribulationem et dolorem
14. Peccantem me quotidie
15. Reminiscere miserationum tuarum
16. Tribularer si nescirem
17. Laboravi in gemitu meo
18. Deus, refugium et virtus
19. O Crux benedicta

Sacrarum cantionum liber primus, 1603 - in fact Liber secundus

1. Ad te levavi
2. Adoramus te Christe
3. Ardens est cor meum
4. Assumpta est Maria
5. Ave sanctissima Maria
6. Da pacem Domine
7. Discedite a me omnes
8. Franciscus humilis et pauper
9. Gaudeamus omnes
10. Illumina nos
11. Ne derelinquas me
12. O anima sanctissima
13. O beata Mater
14. O oriens splendor
15. O sacrum convivium
16. Sana me Domine
17. Veni Creator Spiritus
18. Veni sponsa Christi
19. Verba mea
20. Virgo benedicta

== Editions ==
- Eight songs of the Sacrae Cantiones arranged/completed by Theo Verbey in 2005.

== Recordings ==
- Book 1 Odhecaton, Ensemble Mare Nostrum dir. Paolo Da Col 2013
- Book 2 Vocalconsort Berlin, dir. James Wood 2011
