= Lindsay String Quartet =

British string quartet from 1965 to 2005

The Lindsay String Quartet
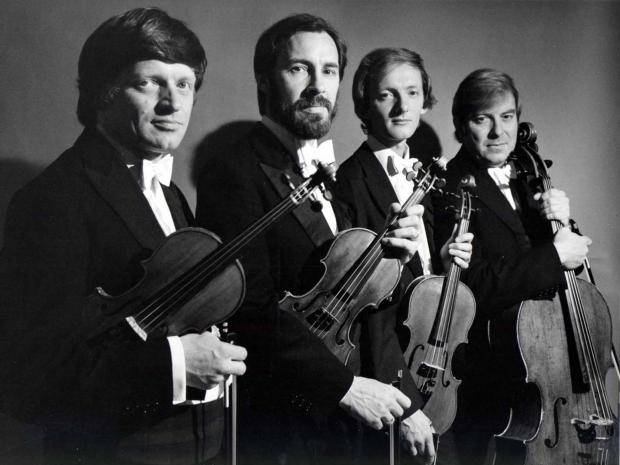
- The Lindsays. From left to right: Peter Cropper, Ronald Birks, Robin Ireland and Bernard Gregor-Smith

Background information
- Also known as: The Lindsays
- Genres: Classical
- Years active: 1965–2005
- Past members: Peter Cropper, 1st violin; Michael Adamson, 2nd violin; Ronald Birks, 2nd violin; Roger Bigley, viola; Robin Ireland, viola; Bernard Gregor-Smith, cello

The Lindsay String Quartet (or The Lindsays) was a British string quartet from 1965 to 2005.

== History ==
The quartet first performed at the Royal Academy of Music in 1965 to compete for a prize and set out to make the string quartets of Bartók and Beethoven the centre of their repertoire. In 1967, the quartet was appointed to be Leverhulme Scholars at Keele University, and in 1970, it changed its name from the Cropper to the Lindsay String Quartet, naming itself after Lord Lindsay, the founder of Keele University. 1971 brought a change in second violin to Ronald Birks. The quartet gained a Gramophone Award for the Late Beethoven Quartets in 1984. Roger Bigley left the quartet in 1985 to be replaced by Robin Ireland. Bigley then became assistant principal viola of the BBC Philharmonic orchestra before becoming assistant head of strings at the RNCM.

In 1974, they became Quartet-in-Residence at Sheffield University and five years later held a similar position at Manchester University, where they performed a regular concert season, directed seminars, and coached chamber ensembles. The quartet presented festivals each year at the Studio Theatre in the Crucible Theatre, Sheffield, which featured many famous local and international musicians, and travelled widely throughout the world.

In 2005, after 39 years, the quartet announced their intended retirement the following year. They then performed a successful series of farewell concerts throughout the world, culminating in four final concerts in their home town of Sheffield in July 2005. Individual members afterwards pursued separate musical ideas.

The quartet produced an extensive list of recordings, including an acclaimed Beethoven cycle, and substantial parts of the Haydn, Mozart, Schubert and Dvořák repertoires.

In 2019, a book titled A Quintessential Quartet: The Story of the Lindsay String Quartet was written by Bernard Gregor-Smith, one of the founding members.

Leader Peter Cropper (19 November 1945 – 29 May 2015) was the founding artistic director of Music in the Round, a charitable organisation he founded in the 1980s, that promotes chamber music concerts in Sheffield and nationally. The Lindsays formed the core of Music in the Round's activity for over twenty years, until their retirement. Cropper died suddenly in 2015 aged 69.

== Members ==
- Peter Cropper (first violin)
- Michael Adamson (second violin, 1965–71)
- Ronald Birks (second violin, 1971–2005)
- Roger Bigley (viola, 1965–85)
- Robin Ireland (viola, 1985–2005)
- Bernard Gregor-Smith (cello)

== Awards ==
Gramophone Award – 1984

Honorary doctorate – Keele University, 1986

Honorary doctorate – Sheffield Hallam University, 1990

Honorary doctorate – University of Leicester, 1998

Honorary doctorate – University of Sheffield, 2001

Honorary doctorate – University of Manchester, 2005

== Books ==
A Quintessential Quartet: The Story of the Lindsay String Quartet written by Bernard Gregor-Smith

== Art ==
A group portrait of the Lindsay String Quartet (Peter Cropper; Ronald Birks; Robin Ireland; Bernard Gregor-Smith) by György Gordon commissioned in 2003 hangs in the National Portrait Gallery, London (NPG 6649).

== ASV Lindsay String Quartet discography ==
BEETHOVEN: String Quartets "Rasumovsky" No. 7, Nos. 8 & 9 CD DCA 553, 554
BEETHOVEN: String Quartets Nos. 12–16 & Grosse Fuge CD DCA 601, 602, 603 & 604
BEETHOVEN: String Quartets (The New Cycle):

Opus 18, Nos. 1, 2 & 3 CD DCA 1111
Opus 18, Nos. 4/5. Opus 14. CD DCA 1112
Opus 18, No. 6. Quintet Op. 29. CD DCA 1113
Opus 59, "Razumovsky" Nos. 1 & 3 CD DCA 1114
Opus 59, No. 2 and Opus 74. CD DCA 1115
Opus 95, Opus 127. CD DCA 1116
Op. 130 & Grosse Fuge Op. 133 CD DCA 1117
Op. 132 & Quintet Op.104 CD DCA 1118
Op. 131 & Op. 135 CD DCA 1119

BARTOK: String Quartets

Nos. 1 & 2 DCA 510
Nos. 3 & 4 DCA 509
Nos. 5 & 6 DCA 504

BORODIN:
String Quartets Nos. 1 & 2, String Sextet (with L. Williams, R. Wallfisch) CD DCA 1143

BRAHMS / SCHUMANN:
Piano Quintets (with P. Frankl) CD DCA 728

MENDELSSOHN : String Quartet No. 6 & BRAHMS : String Quartet No. 2 CD QS 6173
HAYDN: The Seven Last Words CD DCA 853
HAYDN: String Quartets "Sun" Op. 20 – Nos. 1, 3 & 4 CD DCA 1027
HAYDN: String Quartets "Sun" Op. 20 – Nos. 2, 5 & 6 CD DCA 1057
HAYDN: String Quartets Op. 33 – Nos. 1, 2 "The Joke" & 4 CD DCA 937
HAYDN: String Quartets Op. 33 – Nos. 3 "The Bird", 5 & 6 CD DCA 938
HAYDN: The 3 String Quartets Op. 54 "Tost I" CD DCA 582
HAYDN: The 3 String Quartets Op. 55 CD DCA 906
HAYDN: The 3 String Quartets Op. 64 (part 1) CD DCA 1083
HAYDN: The 3 String Quartets Op. 64 (part 2) CD DCA 1084
HAYDN: The 3 String Quartets Op. 76 (part 1) CD DCA 1076
HAYDN: The 3 String Quartets Op. 76 (part 2) CD DCA 1077
Haydn: String Quartets Op. 50 Nos. 1–3 CD GLD 4007
Haydn: String Quartets Op. 50 Nos. 4–6 CD GLD 4008
Haydn: String Quartets Op. 74 Nos. 1–3 CD GLD 40132
Hadyn: String Quartets Op. 77 Nos. 1–2, Op. 42, Op. 103 CD GLD 40102

MOZART: String Quartet K387 / String Quintet K516 CD DCA 923
MOZART: String Quartet K458 "The Hunt" / Horn Quintet / Oboe Quartet CD DCA 968
MOZART: String Quartet K428 / String Quintet K515 CD DCA 992
MOZART: String Quartet K421 / String Quintet K593 CD DCA 1018
MOZART: String Quartet K464 / Clarinet Quintet K581 CD DCA 1042
MOZART: String Quartet K465 / String Quintet K614 CD DCA 1069

RAVEL & DEBUSSY: String Quartets / STRAVINSKY: 3 Pieces CD DCA 930

SCHUBERT: String Quintet (with Douglas Cummings - cello) CD DCA 537
SCHUBERT: String Quartets Nos. 8 & 13 "Rosamunde" CD DCA 593
SCHUBERT: String Quartets Nos. 12 & 14 "Death and the Maiden" CD DCA 560
SCHUBERT: String Quartet No. 15 CD DCA 661

TIPPETT: String Quartet No. 4 / BRITTEN: String Quartet No. 3 CD DCA 608

"THE BOHEMIANS"
JANACEK: The 2 String Quartets "Kreutzer Sonata" & "Intimate Letters" / DVORAK: Cypresses CD DCA 749
SMETANA: The 2 String Quartets / DVORAK: Romance & 2 Waltzes CD DCA 777
DVORAK: String Quartets Nos. 10 & 14 CD DCA 788
DVORAK: String Quartets Nos. 12 "The American" & 13 CD DCA 797
DVORAK: Bagatelles / String Quintet "The American" CD DCA 806
DVORAK & MARTINU: Piano Quintets (with Peter Frankl – piano) CD DCA 889
