= Loew's Theatre (New Rochelle) =

Historic movie theater in Westchester County, New York

Coordinates: 40°54′24.9″N 73°47′5.8″W

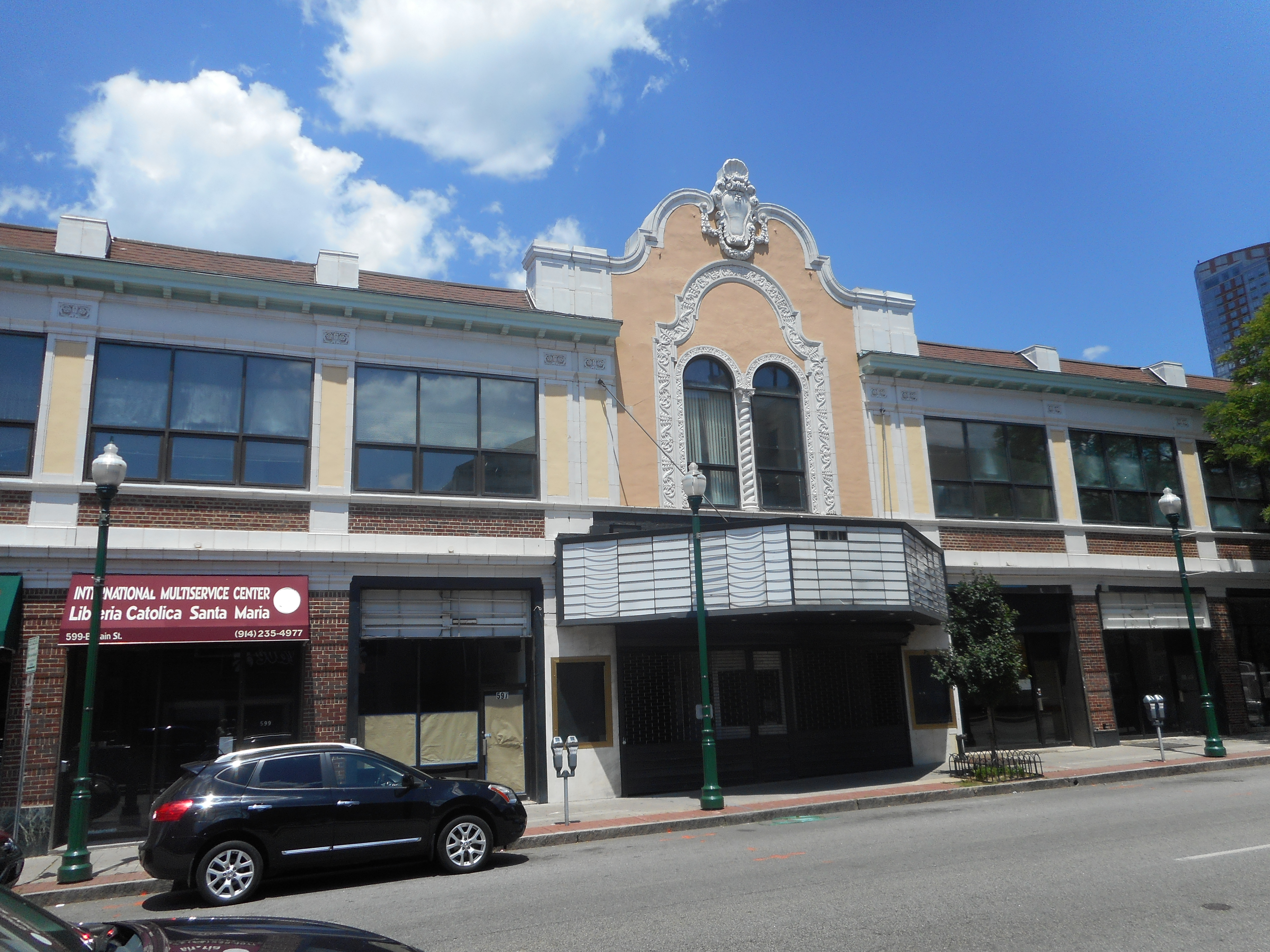
- The former movie theater in June 2016
- Interactive map of Loew's Theatre
- Address: 585 – 599 Main Street; New Rochelle, New York; United States
- Capacity: 2,485
- Type: Movie palace

Construction
- Opened: 1926
- Closed: 1980
- Architects: Thomas W. Lamb; Herbert J. Krapp

Loew's Theatre is a historic movie theater located on Main Street in the Downtown section of the city of New Rochelle in Westchester County, New York.

During the 1920s, the "Golden Age" of the movies, there was a tremendous boom in the construction of motion picture houses and theaters built in New Rochelle during this period were only slightly less elaborate than the grand movie palaces found in big cities. Loew's Theatre at 585–599 Main Street was built in 1926, and the RKO Proctor's Theater across the street was built the following year. Both buildings share the basic design of a long, two-story facade containing shops at the street level, with the entrance to the theater itself emphasized by decorative elements and the marquee.

The design inspiration for the Loew's is Spanish, interpreted through elements such as clay tile roofs and a baroque parapet over the entrance. The 2,500 seat building was designed by leading theater architect Herbert J. Krapp. The theater featured vaudeville and live stage shows with renown performers and celebrities such as Bob Hope, Lucille Ball, Bette Davis, George and Gracie Burns, Sophie Tucker, and George and Gracie Burns, Sophie Tucker, George M. Cohan, Olivia de Havilland and Will Rogers.

The Loews Theatre site mirrors the tale of many early American suburbs. New Rochelle, mostly known as a bedroom community serving New York, saw tremendous growth and success during the first half of the 20th century. At that time the Loews theater was part of a flourishing downtown benefitting from its affluent residents and proximity to the city. The theater has since been made obsolete by inventions such as the television and VCR, and by newer, larger movie facilities with multiple screens and cutting edge technology.

In July 2012 the New Rochelle Business Improvement Program won a $500,000 grant from the New York State Main Street Program to further the restoration of historically significant buildings in the downtown business district. The restoration of the Loew's Theatre facade was the first project to be funded by this grant. Extensive terracotta and other original architectural details which had been hidden for decades were also uncovered and restored to their original state.

In June 2016, developer RXR Realty proposed a $120 million plan for a "28-story building with 280 apartments, a 277-space parking garage and retail storefronts." Leasing began in June 2019. The developer has "restored the historic facade and marquee" and added "a new 10,000-square-foot arts and cultural space" including a black box theater, but has been criticized for the "mixed space" not including municipal-income-generating "things like hotel space," "office and residential," and adequate public parking.
