= Strand Theater (Lakewood, New Jersey) =

- Strand Theatre
- U.S. National Register of Historic Places
- New Jersey Register of Historic Places
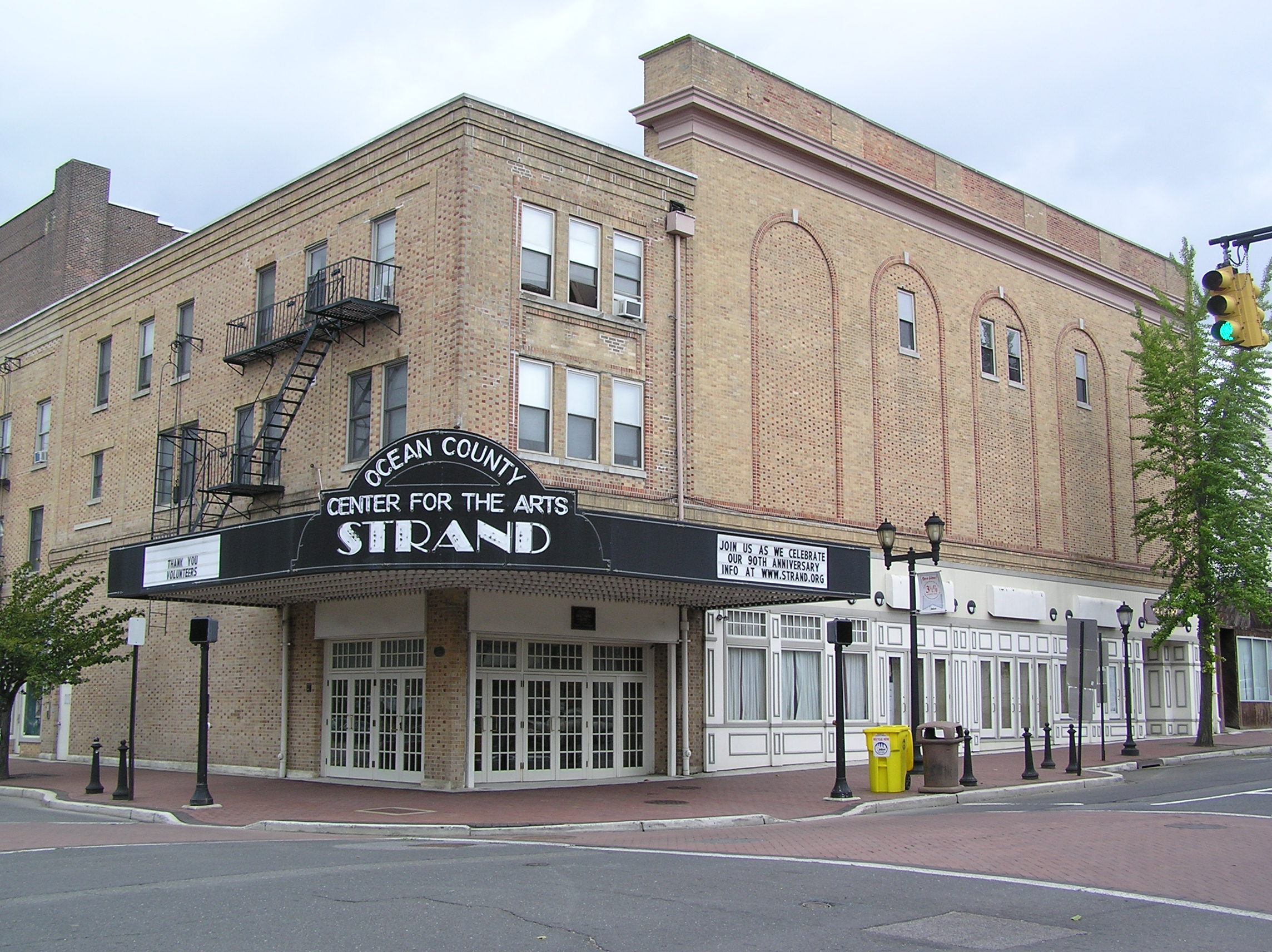

- Location within Ocean County, New Jersey Location within New Jersey Location within the United States
- Location: 400 Clifton Avenue, Lakewood Township, New Jersey
- Coordinates: 40°5′39″N 74°12′57″W
- Built: 1919
- Architect: Thomas W. Lamb
- Architectural style: Art Deco, Adamesque
- NRHP reference No.: 82003292
- NJRHP No.: 2310

Significant dates
- Added to NRHP: April 22, 1982
- Designated NJRHP: March 27, 1981

The Strand Theater is a vaudeville theater located at 400 Clifton Avenue in Lakewood Township, Ocean County, New Jersey. It was added to the National Register of Historic Places on April 22, 1982, for its significance in architecture, art, and theater.

== History ==
The theater was designed by Thomas W. Lamb, and built for the Ferber Amusement Company in 1922 as a place for pre-Broadway runs of shows. The first event at the theater was a showing of a silent film, Peacock Alley starring Mae Murray. The next show was a pre-Broadway run of "The Devine Cook" starring Florence Reed.

Within a few years of its opening, the Strand began to host vaudeville shows and silent films. Among the stars who appeared on the Strand's stage early in their careers included Burns and Allen, Milton Berle, and Ray Bolger.

During World War II, the theater became a cinema house, and omitted the vaudeville acts. As suburban multiplex movie theaters were built, the single screen theater lost its audience. During its economic decline it became an adult movie theater in the 1970s. In 1981 the theater was added to the List of Registered Historic Places in New Jersey. The theater received a $2.4 million grant from the New Jersey Economic Development Authority in 1994 for restoration of its Neo-classical and Art Deco interiors. The theater serves as the Ocean County Center for the Arts.
