= Lincoln Theatre (Miami Beach, Florida) =

Building in Miami Beach, Florida, United States

Coordinates: 25.7907777°N 80.133969°W

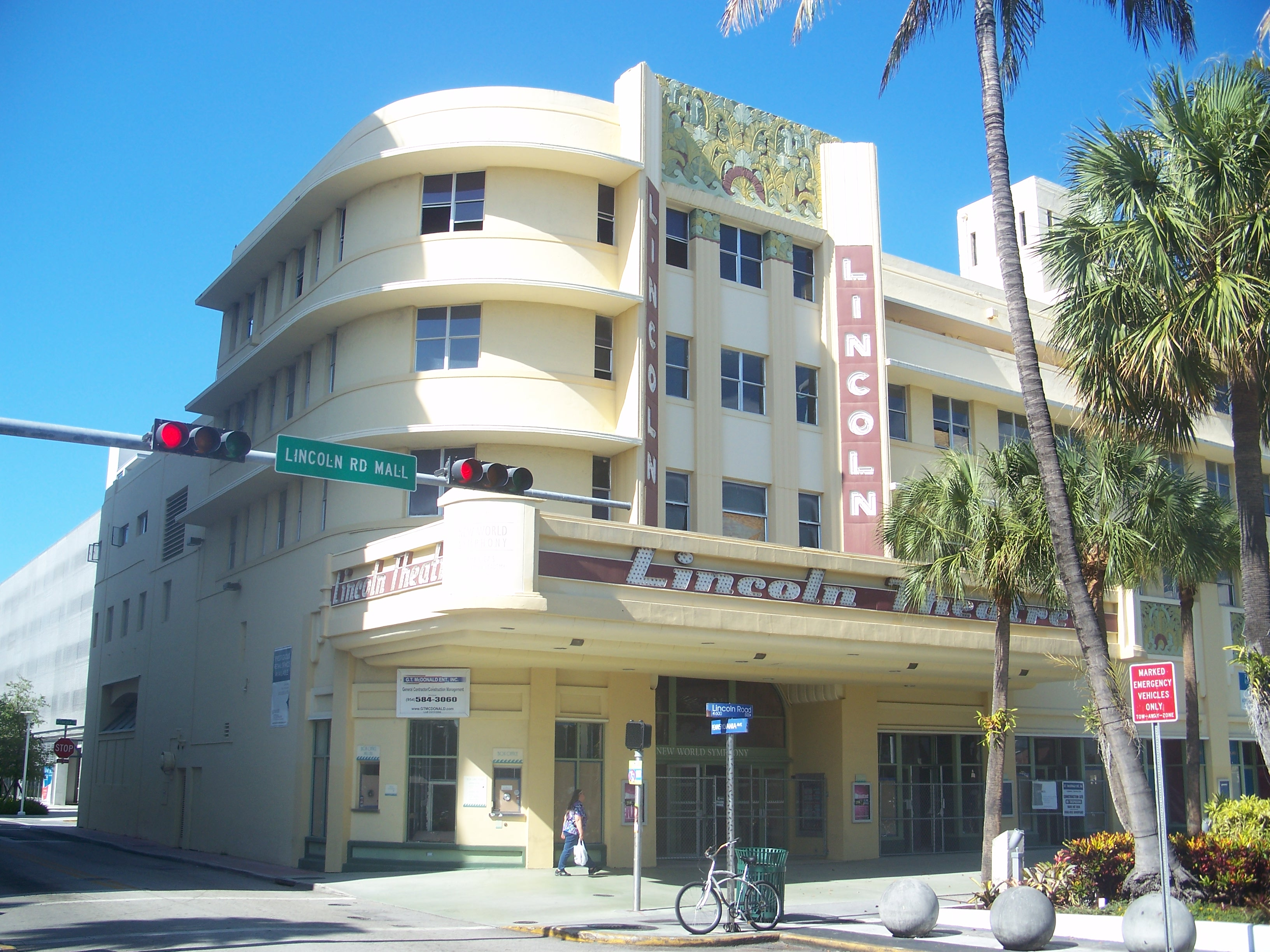
- Lincoln Theatre in 2011
- Interactive map of Lincoln Theatre
- Location: 541 Lincoln Road; Miami Beach, Florida

Construction
- Opened: 1936
- Architect: Thomas W. Lamb

The Lincoln Theatre on Lincoln Road in the South Beach neighborhood of Miami Beach, Florida was a movie theater and later a concert hall. It was designed in art deco style by noted cinema and theater designer Thomas W. Lamb and opened in 1936. It functioned as a cinema until the 1980s, then sat vacant for several years, then was used for performances of the New World Symphony, which bought it in 1990. The symphony carried out a multimillion-dollar renovation.

The symphony moved to the new and much larger Frank Gehry-designed New World Center in 2011, and already before that in February 2010, Clifford Stein purchased the building to turn into retail shops. In January 2012, H&M was signed as the first tenant. As of February 2012 the property was in the process of being converted to retail, with much of the interior gutted. On April 18, 2012, the American Institute of Architects's Florida Chapter placed the building on its list of Florida Architecture: 100 Years. 100 Places as Lincoln Theater.
