= The Sanderson Centre =

Sanderson Centre for the Performing Arts
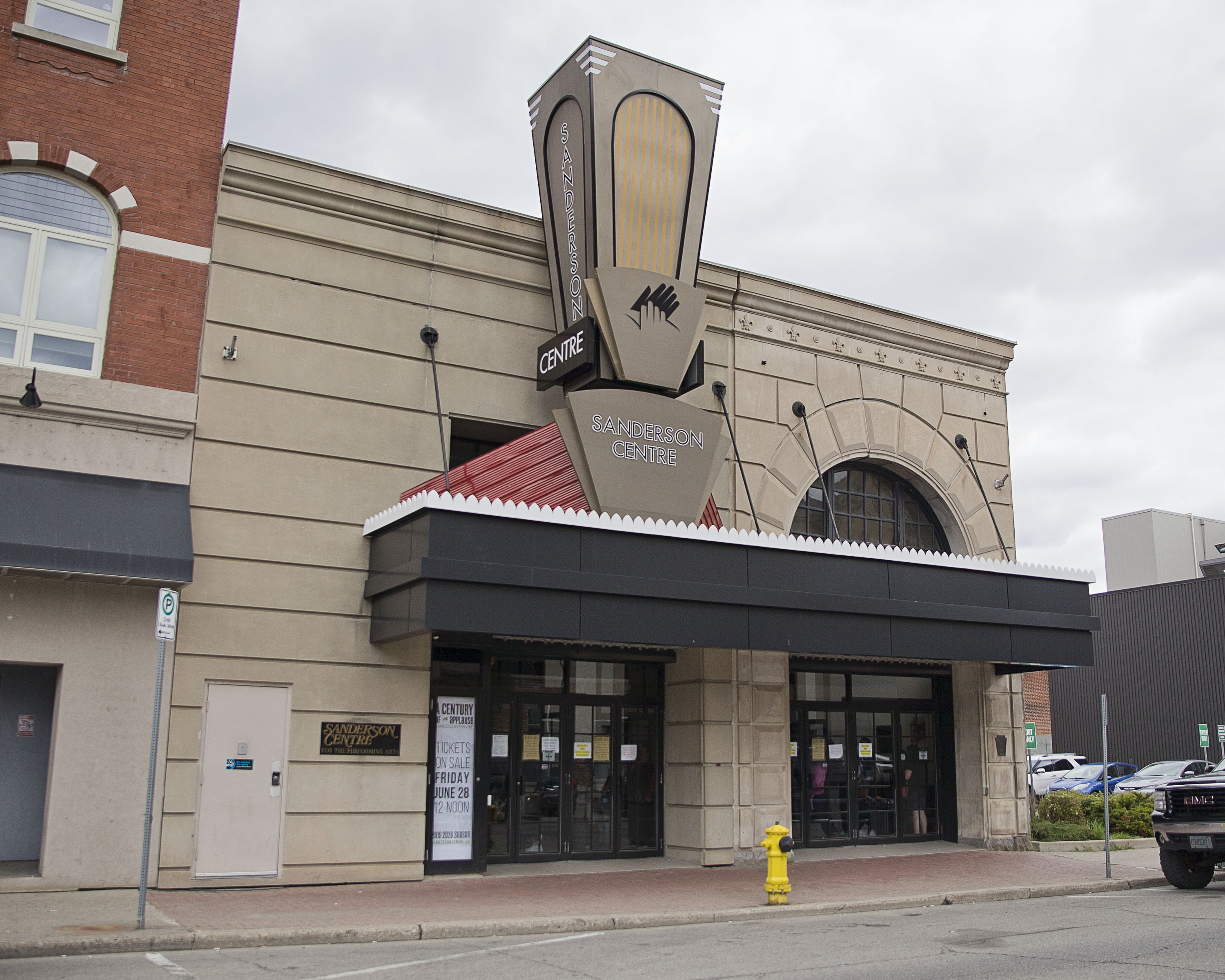
- Sanderson Centre main entrance
- Interactive map of Sanderson Centre for the Performing Arts
- Former names: Temple Theatre, Capitol Theatre
- Address: 88 Dalhousie St
- Location: Brantford, Ontario, Canada
- Coordinates: 43.13994°N 80.26464°W
- Owner: City of Brantford
- Capacity: 1125
- Type: Arts centre

Construction
- Built: 1919
- Opened: December 22, 1919
- Architect: Thomas W. Lamb
- Builders: P.H. Secord and Sons
- General contractors: P.H. Secord and Sons

Website
- www.sandersoncentre.ca

The Sanderson Centre for the Performing Arts is a heritage theatre and concert hall located in the heart of downtown Brantford, Ontario. The Sanderson Centre seats 1,125 people and is a home for local performing arts organizations like the Brantford Symphony Orchestra and provides a venue for school and community events, recitals and amateur dance competitions. The Sanderson Centre also offers a season of professional entertainment and arts programming.

The building was opened on December 22, 1919, as the Temple Theatre, a vaudeville and silent movie house. The theatre was designed and built by Scottish architect Thomas W. Lamb at a cost of $350,000. By the late 1920s, feature film presentations had eclipsed vaudeville as the entertainment rage and live entertainment at the Temple Theatre was swept away with the popular tide. In 1929, Famous Players purchased the Temple Theatre to operate as a cinema, eventually renaming it The Capitol in 1930.

In 1986, the City of Brantford purchased the theatre for $425,000, with the assistance of dedicated community volunteers who raised funds to revitalize the building. Over the next several years, the theatre was reborn with an authentically restored auditorium and improved services for guests and performers. The theatre was renamed the Sanderson Centre for the Performing Arts to recognize the Sanderson family's generous support for the project and ongoing philanthropic support in the community.

The Sanderson Centre is a recipient of the Prestigious “Theatre Preservation Award” presented by the League of Historic American Theatres.

== See also ==
- List of concert halls
