= State Theatre Center for the Arts (Uniontown, Pennsylvania) =

Coordinates: 39.90134°N 79.72445°W

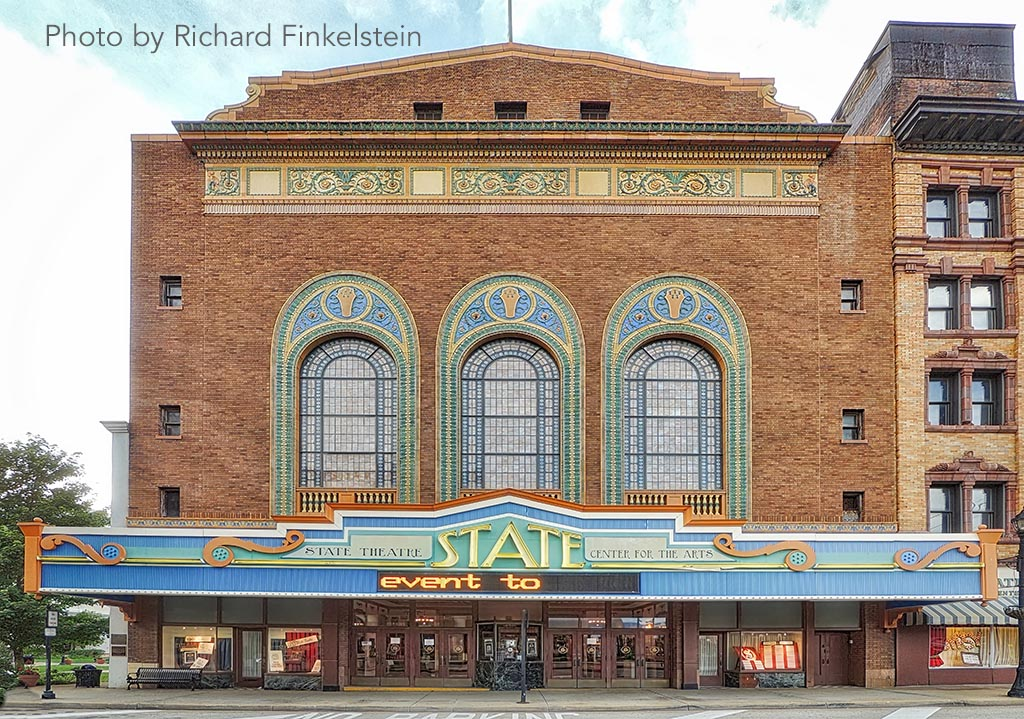
State Theater in Uniontown

The State Theatre Center for the Arts (formerly State Theatre) in Uniontown, Pennsylvania was designed by Thomas W. Lamb and constructed in 1922.

== History ==
In 1921, the Penn Amusement Company commissioned prominent architect Thomas Lamb to design a "picture palace" to be constructed in Uniontown, PA. Upon opening on October 30, 1922, the theatre was hailed as "the largest, finest, and most beautiful playhouse in Western Pennsylvania." The theatre began showing silent movies and hosting Vaudeville acts from the B.F. Keith Circuit. Additionally, the orchestra pit housed a Pleubet Master Organ to accompany silent films.

During the rise of swing music and the big band, the theatre began to see more live music performances. Among the most noted performers were Paul Whiteman, Glen Gray, and the Dorsey Brothers. These live music shows remained a cornerstone of the theatre's productions until the rise of “talkies”, driving performances away from Vaudeville and big-band shows as the movie industry developed.

Despite the popularity of movie palaces, the rise of television ultimately took its toll on the theatre. This shift in how people watched movies led to the development of theatres with multiple screens to show different movies at the same time. This growth in specialization led to the State Theatre's closure in June 1973.

The community did not take well to having the theatre closed. A number of years later, the theatre was reopened and used once again as a concert hall where many country musicians perform. However, the theatre saw even less success as a concert hall and subsequently closed once again, much to the dismay of Uniontown residents.

In 1988 the Greater Uniontown Heritage Consortium purchased the theatre. It began presenting a series of nationally touring professional productions ranging from Broadway musicals to Big Bands, symphonies, dance and dramatic performances. In 2007, The Theatre began offering a Classic Film Series, showing the greatest movies ever made on the big screen and returning the theatre to a "picture palace." The Education Series offers field trip opportunities for schoolchildren and is often the first theatre experience local children enjoy. The theatre also hosts professionally promoted concerts, local dance recitals, high school musicals, and civic events.

== Architecture ==
The State Theatre Center for the Arts was constructed in the Beaux-Arts style, which originated in the École des Beaux-Arts in Paris. The construction involved art designers from the Ingstrip-Burke Company of Chicago, led by Michael Tomlin, who decorated the interior in Adam Style. This theme was intended to create a "refinement of line and chasteness of ornamentation." This style was commonly used in the United States in the 19th century to pay homage to ancient Greek and Roman architecture styles, making use of features such as columns, pilasters, triangular pieces, large stairways, elaborate ornamentation, and balconies. The designs were always symmetrical, and the buildings were constructed with stone.

== Notable Performers ==
The State Theatre Center for the Arts has hosted very popular entertainers and productions over the past 90 years. The most notable names are jazz musicians Paul Whiteman and Glen Gray, The Dorsey Brothers, popular musicians Johnny Cash, Slim Whitman, Waylon Jennings, Glen Campbell, Anne Murray, Chubby Checker and the Statler Brothers.
