= Boulevard Theatre (Queens) =

Coordinates: 40.75552°N 73.88458°W

Boulevard Theatre was an 1,839-seat theater opened in 1926 in the Jackson Heights section of Queens, New York. It now lives on as the Boulevard Latin Cuisine restaurant. Herbert J. Krapp was the building's architect and it was part of the Grob & Knobel circuit. Designed as a playhouse it showed pre-openings headed for Broadway and shows closed out on Broadway. These attractions were shown Monday through Saturday, while vaudeville and a feature movie were shown on Sundays.

It eventually became a double-feature movie house, competing with the Jackson Theatre, and was later modified into a triplex as it struggled to survive into the 1980s. It closed and was empty for a decade as neighborhood progression took hold. The owner wanted it demolished, but with community support it was eventually converted into a dinner theater venue serving the area's Hispanic community. The entrance and lobby of the theater is now a restaurant and bar, and three auditoriums in the back are used for plays, concerts, and import films.
