= Thomas W. Lamb =

American architect (1871–1942)

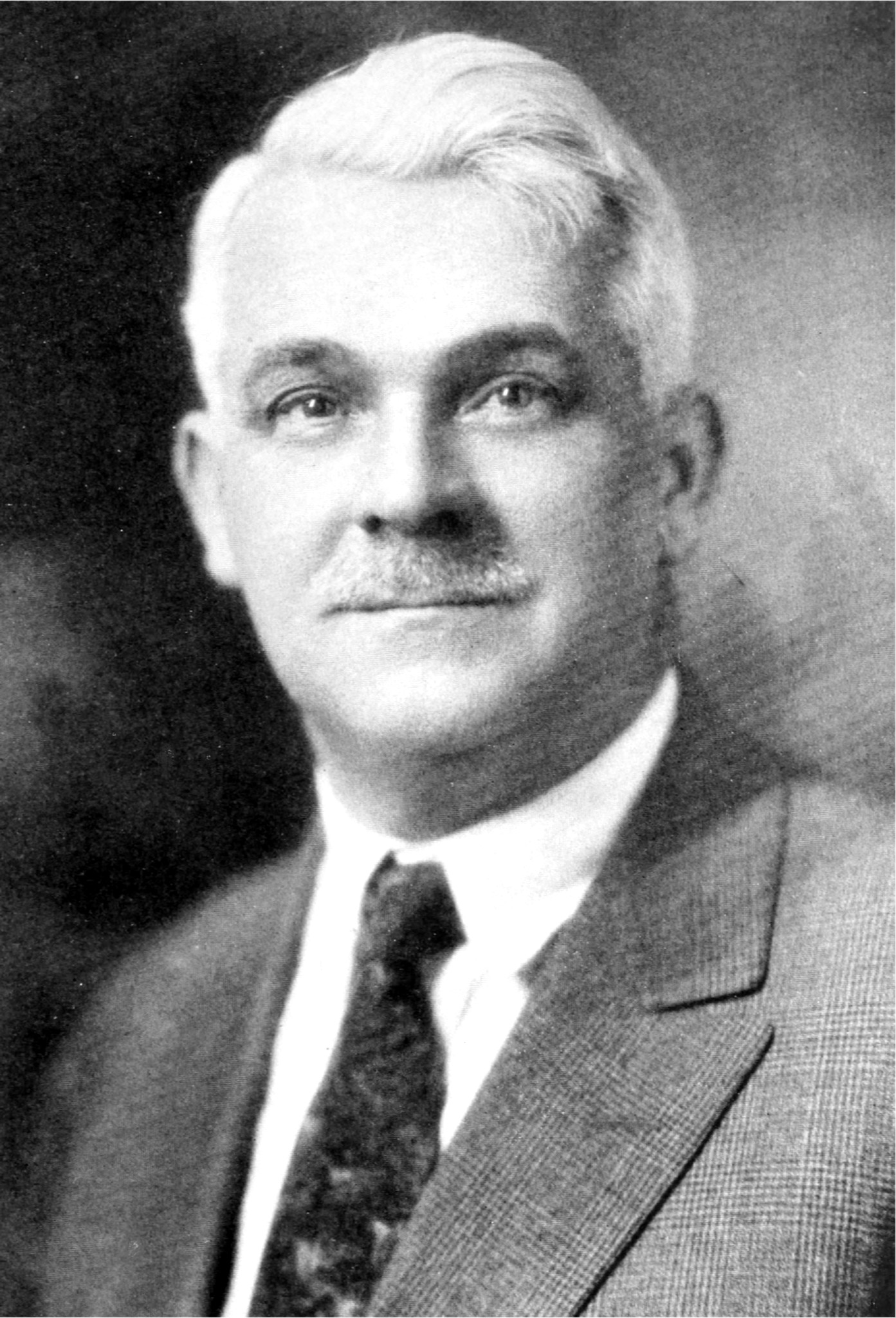
- Lamb in 1926
- Born: May 5, 1870; Dundee, Scotland
- Died: February 26, 1942 (aged 71); New York City, U.S.
- Education: Cooper Union
- Occupation: Architect
- Practice: Thomas W. Lamb, Incorporated
- Buildings: Fox Theatre, San Francisco, 1929; Madison Square Garden, 1925

Thomas White Lamb (May 5, 1870 – February 26, 1942) was an American architect. He was one of the foremost designers of theaters and cinemas of the 20th century.

== Career ==
Born in Dundee, Scotland, United Kingdom, Thomas W. Lamb came to the United States at the age of 12. He studied architecture at Cooper Union in New York and initially worked for the City of New York as an inspector. His architecture firm, Thomas W. Lamb, Inc., was located at 36 West 40th Street in Manhattan, New York.

Lamb achieved recognition as one of the leading architects of the boom in movie theater construction of the 1910s and 1920s. Particularly associated with the Fox Theatres, Loew's Theatres and Keith-Albee chains of vaudeville and film theaters, Lamb was instrumental in establishing and developing the design and construction of the large, lavishly decorated theaters, known as "movie palaces", as showcases for the films of the emerging Hollywood studios.

As early as 1904, Lamb was credited with renovations for two existing theaters in the city: the Weber and Fields' Broadway Music Hall at 1215 Broadway, and the Dewey Theater on East 14th Street, the latter owned by Tammany Hall figure "Big Tim" Sullivan. His first complete theater design was the City Theatre, built on 14th Street in 1909 for film mogul William Fox. His designs for the 1914 Mark Strand Theatre, the 1916 Rialto Theatre and the 1917 Rivoli Theatre, all in Times Square, set the template for what would become the American movie palace.

Among his most notable theaters are the 1929 Fox Theatre in San Francisco and the 1919 Capitol Theatre in New York, both now demolished. Among his most noted designs that have been preserved and restored are the B.F. Keith Memorial Theatre in Boston (1928) (now the Boston Opera House), Warner's Hollywood Theatre (1930) in New York (now the Times Square Church), the Hippodrome Theatre (1914) in Baltimore, and the Loew's Ohio Theatre (1928) in Columbus, Ohio. Among Lamb's existing Canadian theaters are the Pantages Theatre in Toronto (1920) (now the Ed Mirvish Theatre). and Elgin and Winter Garden Theatres. The Cinema Treasures website, which documents the history of film theaters, lists 174 theaters designed by Lamb's company.

Aside from movie theaters, Lamb is noted for designing (with Joseph Urban) New York's Ziegfeld Theatre, a legitimate theater, as well as the third Madison Square Garden and the Paramount Hotel in midtown Manhattan.

Lamb died in 1942 in New York City at the age of 71. His architectural archive is held by the Drawings and Archives Department of Avery Architectural and Fine Arts Library at Columbia University.

=== John J. McNamara ===
During the last ten years of his practice, Lamb's associate was the architect John J. McNamara. After Lamb's death, McNamara continued as an architect of theaters under his own name. McNamara was responsible for renovating some of Lamb's older New York theaters, and among his original designs was one for the 1969 Ziegfeld Theatre in Manhattan, which replaced Lamb's original building.

== Selected theater designs ==
=== United States ===
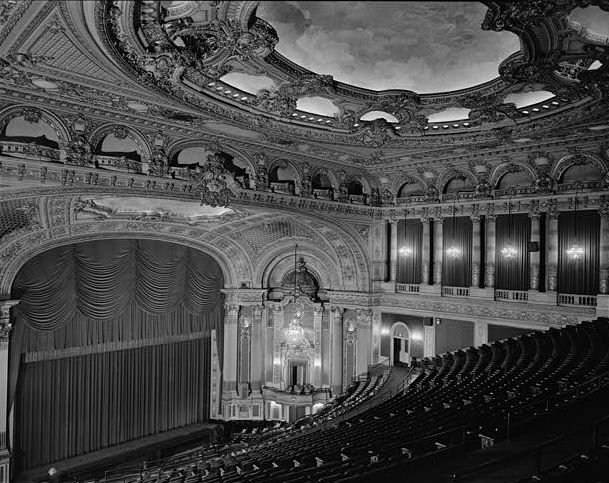
Interior of B.F. Keith Memorial Theatre, Boston, 1928 (1970)

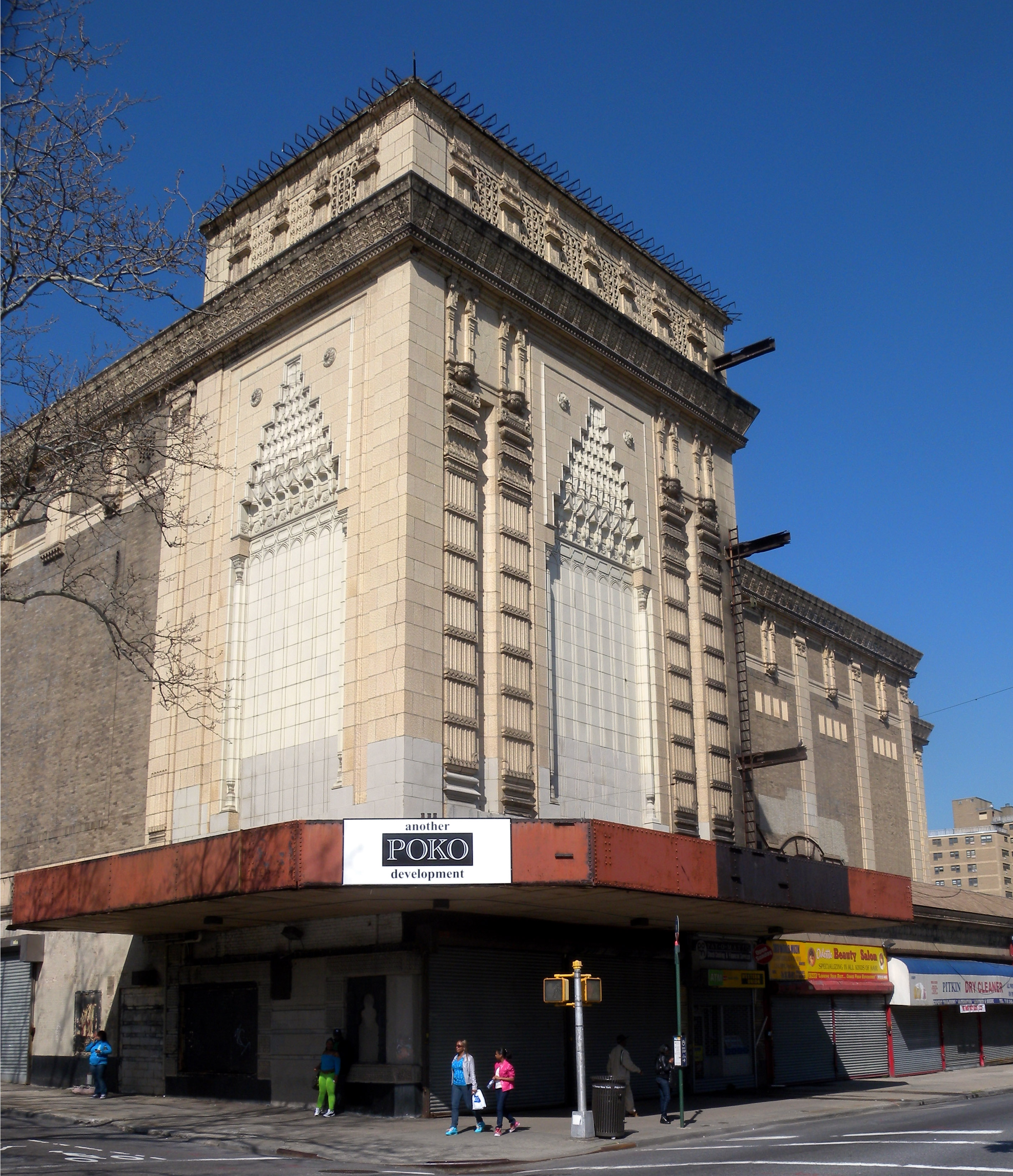
Pitkin, Brooklyn, 1928 (2010)

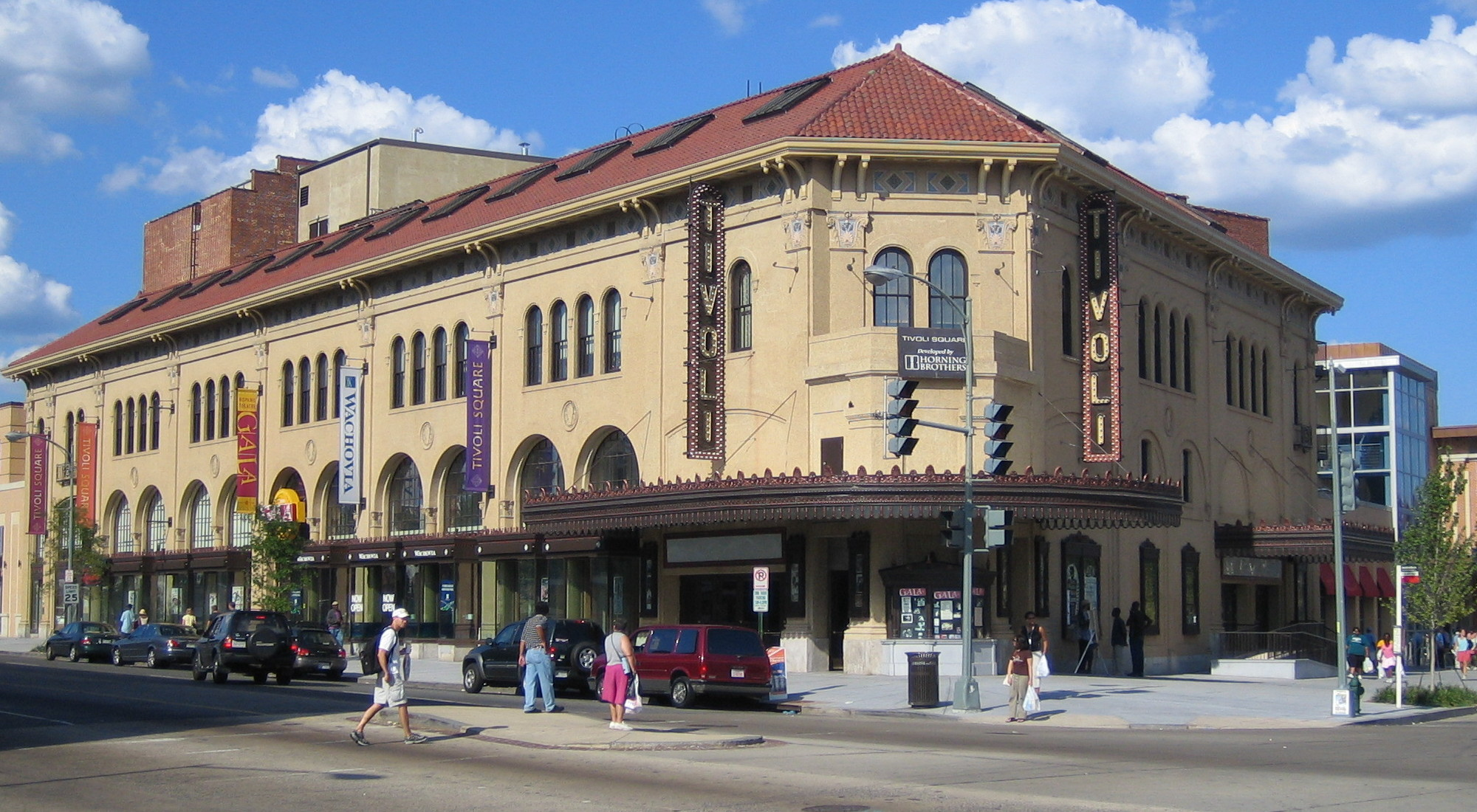
Tivoli, Washington, DC, 1924 (2005)

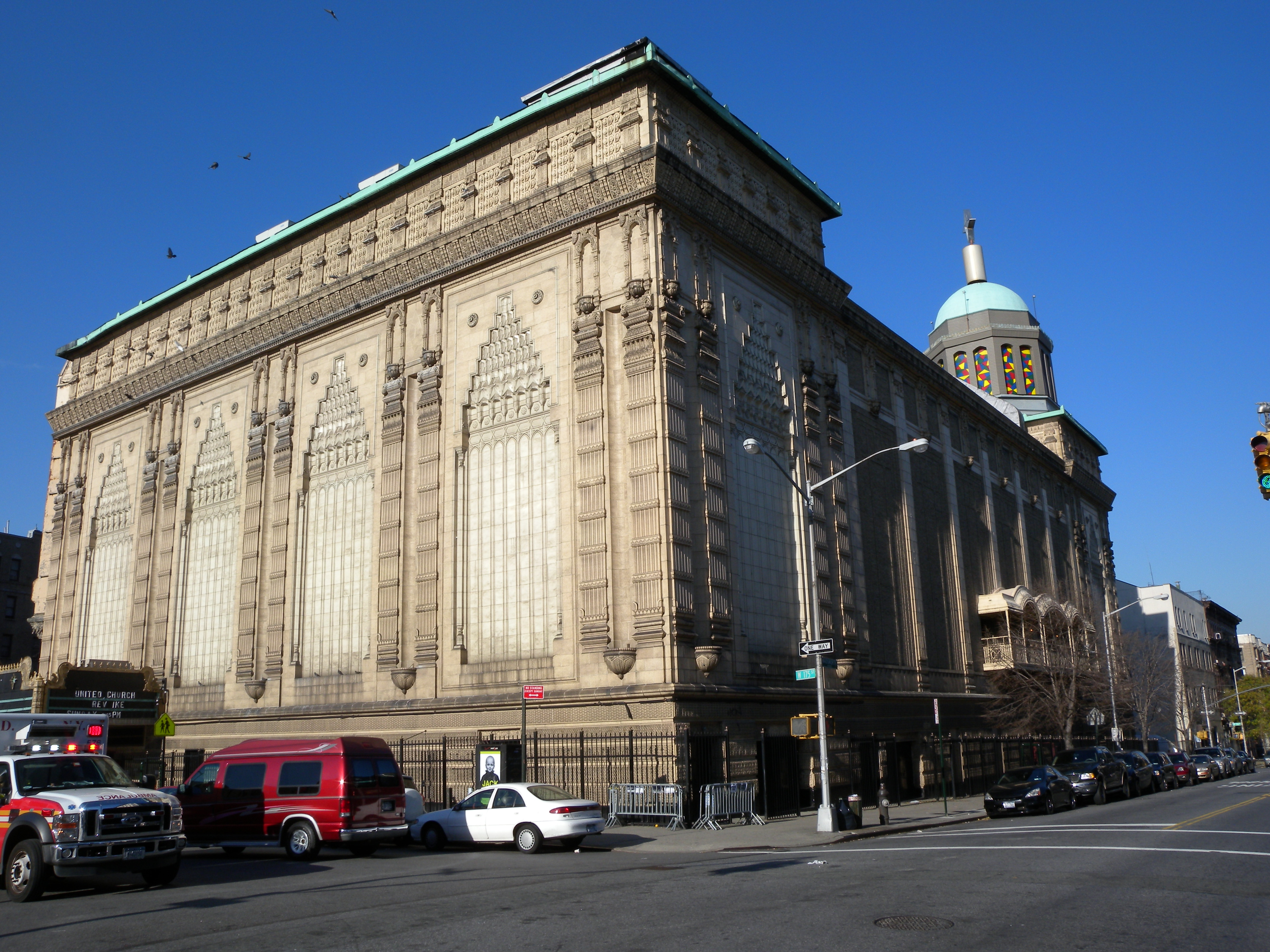
The United Palace Theater, formerly Loew's 175th Street Theatre, New York, 1930 (2009)

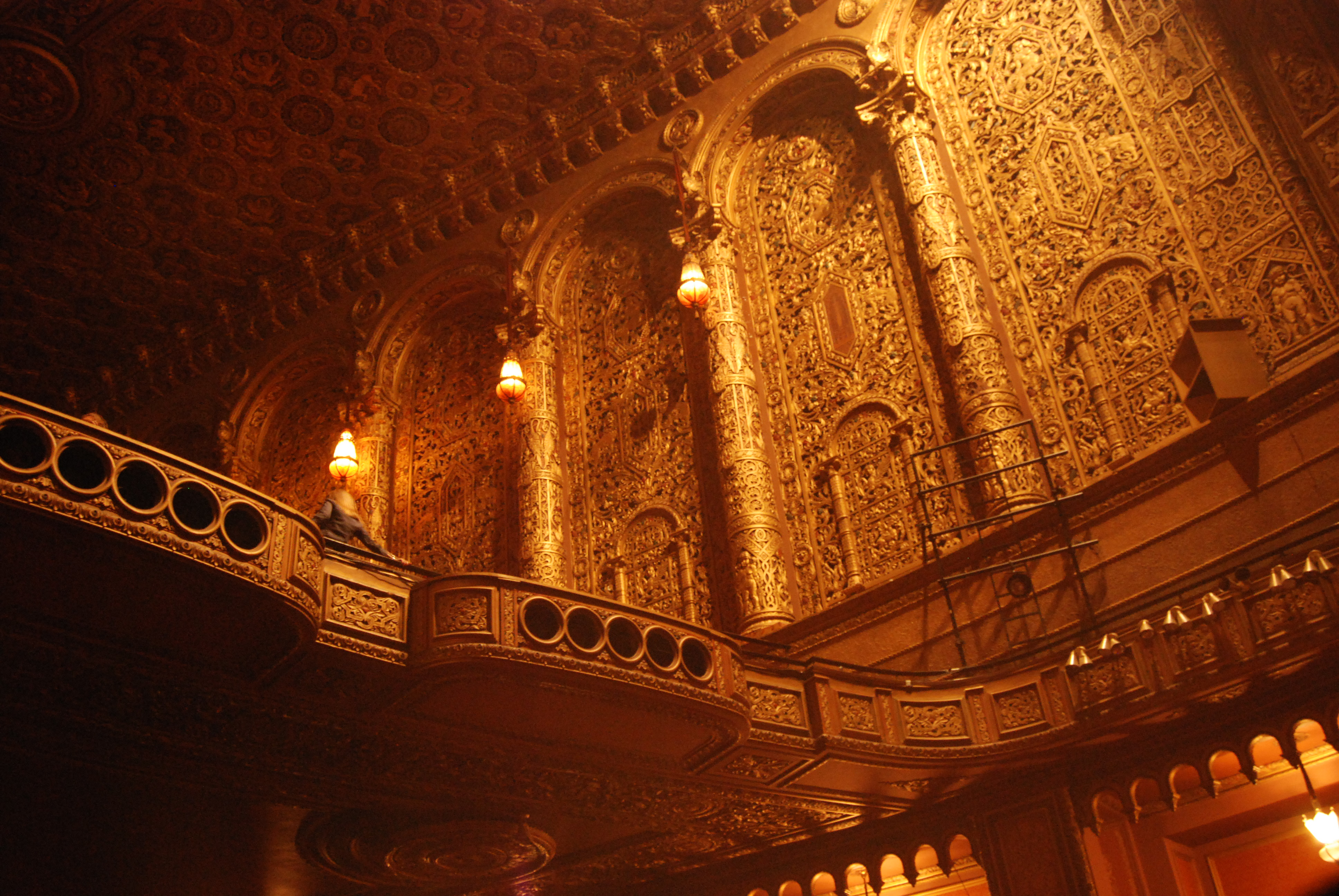
Interior of the United Palace Theater (2007)

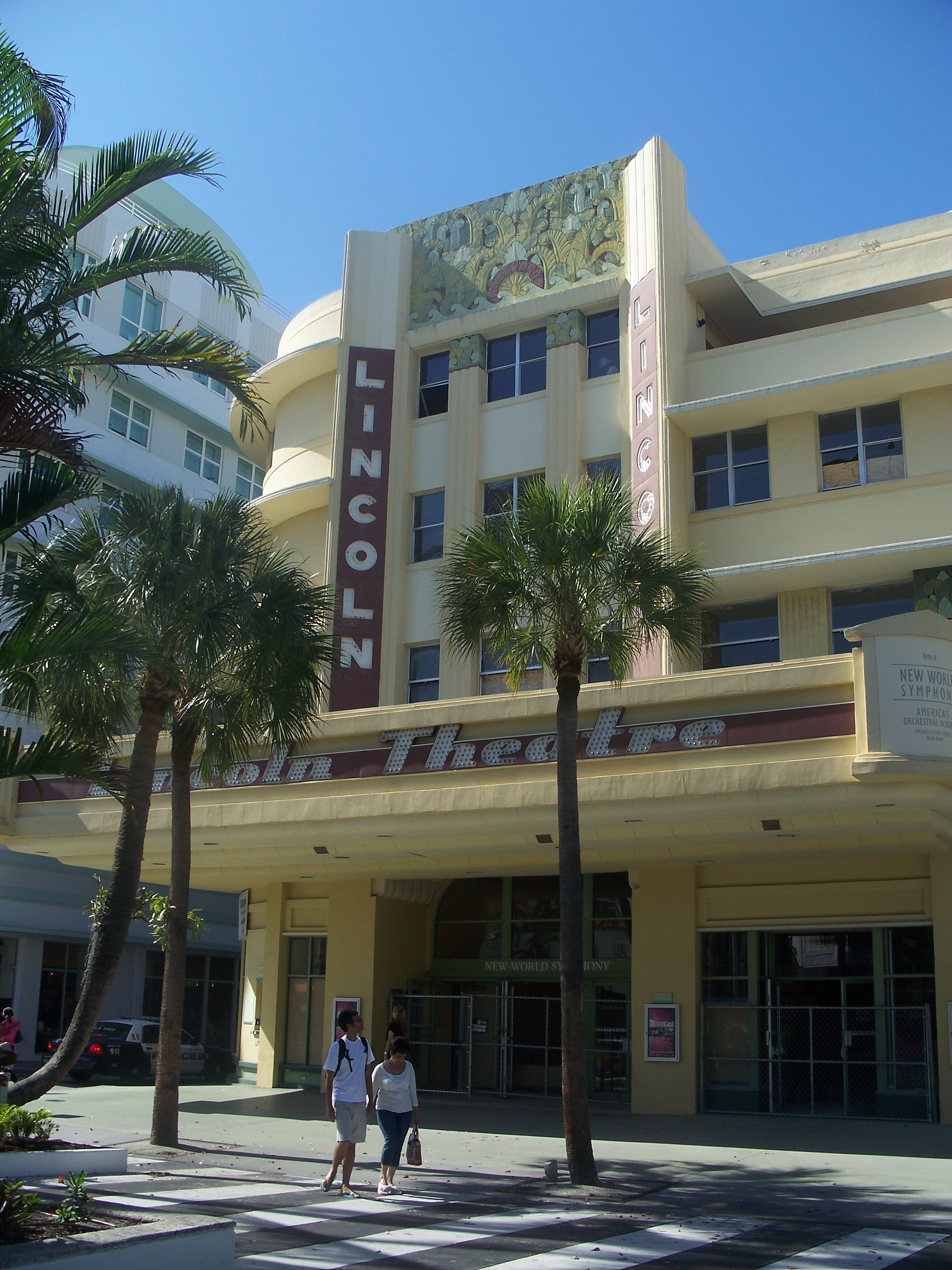
Lincoln Theatre, Lincoln Road, South Beach, Miami Beach, Florida, 1936

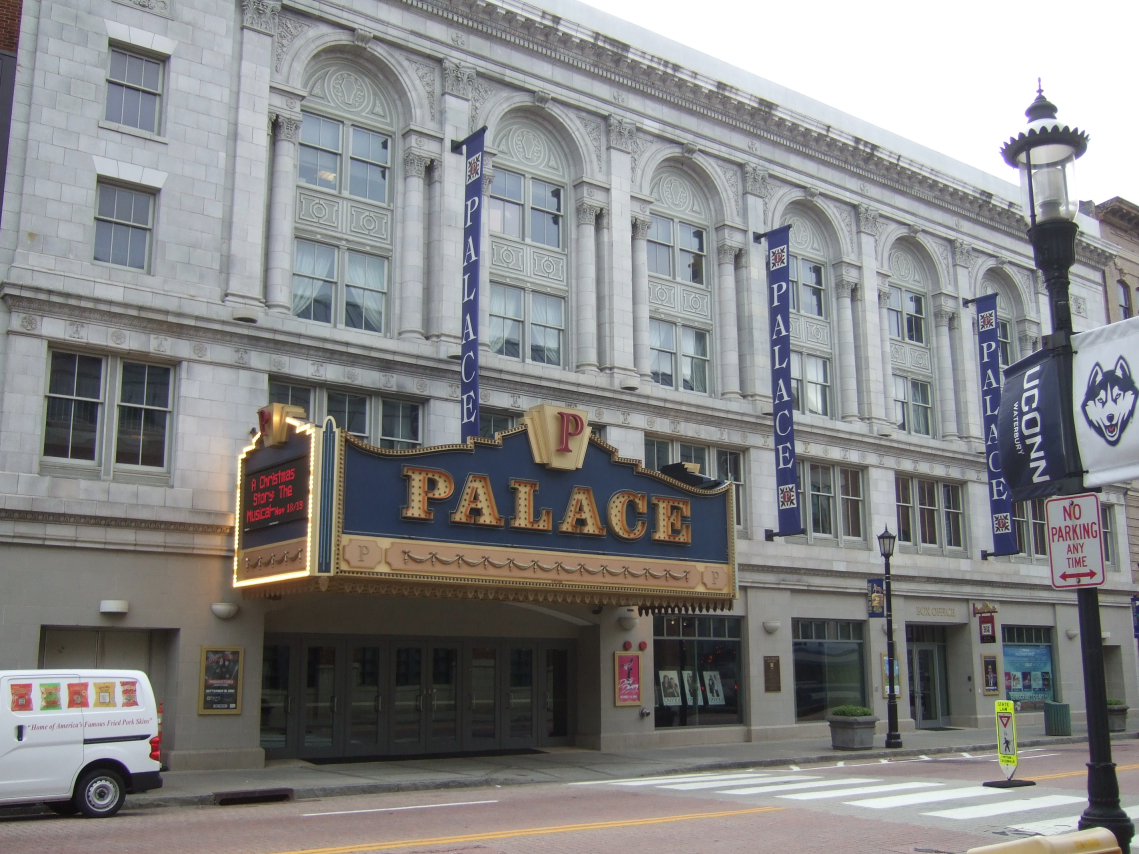
Palace Theater, Waterbury, Connecticut, 1922 (2016)
- Academy of Music, New York City, 1927
- B.F. Keith Memorial Theatre, Boston, Massachusetts, 1928
- Capitol Theatre, New York City, 1919
- Capitol Theatre, Port Chester, New York, 1926
- Cort (now James Earl Jones) Theatre, New York City, 1912
- Embassy Theatre, New York City, 1925
- Eltinge 42nd Street Theatre, New York City, 1912
- Fenway Theatre, Boston, 1915
- Fox Theatre, San Francisco, California, 1929
- Grand Opera House, Philadelphia, Pennsylvania, 1913, remodel
- Franklin Square Theatre, Worcester, Massachusetts, 1927
- Hippodrome Theatre, Baltimore, Maryland, 1914
- Hippodrome, New York City, 1923 redesign
- Keith-Albee Theatre, Flushing, Queens, New York, 1928
- Keith-Albee Theatre, Huntington, West Virginia, 1928
- Keith-Albee Palace Theatre, Columbus, Ohio, 1926
- Keith-Albee Palace Theatre, Stamford, Connecticut, 1927
- Lincoln Theatre, Miami Beach, Florida, 1936
- Loew's 72nd Street Theatre, New York City, 1930
- Loew’s Canal Theatre, 1926
- Loew's 175th Street Theater, New York City, 1930
- Loew's and United Artists' Ohio Theatre, Columbus, Ohio, 1928
- Loew's Grand Theatre, Atlanta, Georgia, 1932 redesign
- Loew's Midland Theatre, Kansas City, Missouri, 1927
- Midway Theatre, Forest Hills, New York, 1942
- Loew's Pitkin Theatre, Brooklyn, New York, 1928
- Loew's State Theatre, Playhouse Square, Cleveland, Ohio, 1920
- State Theatre New Jersey 15 Livingston Ave., New Brunswick, New Jersey. 1921
- Loew's State Theatre (Now the TCC Roper Performing Arts Center), Norfolk, Virginia, 1926
- Loew's State Theatre, Back Bay, Boston, 1922
- Loew's State Theatre, Times Square, New York City, 1924
- Newark Paramount Theatre, Downtown Newark, Newark, New Jersey, 1920s.
- Loew's State Theatre, New Orleans, Louisiana, 1926
- Loew's Theatre, New Rochelle, New York, 1925
- Loew's State Theatre (Now the Landmark Theatre), Syracuse, New York, 1928
- Madison Square Garden, New York City, 1925
- Madison Theater, Albany, New York, 1929
- Mark Hellinger Theatre (now Times Square Church), New York City, 1930
- Mark Strand Theater, New York City, 1914
- Maryland Theatre, Hagerstown, Maryland, 1915
- Municipal Auditorium, Birmingham, Alabama, 1924
- Ohio Theatre, Playhouse Square, Cleveland, Ohio, 1921
- Orpheum Theatre, Boston, Massachusetts, 1915 redesign
- Palace Theater, Waterbury, Connecticut, 1922
- Poli's Majestic Theatre, Bridgeport, Connecticut, 1922
- Poli's Palace Theatre, Bridgeport, Connecticut, 1922
- Pythian Temple, Manhattan, 1927, the spacious theater the building once housed is gone; the facade remains.
- Proctor's 58th Street Theatre, New York City, 1928
- Proctor's 86th Street Theatre, New York City, 1927
- Proctor's Theatre, Schenectady, New York, 1926
- Reade's State Theatre, New Brunswick, New Jersey, 1921
- Regent Theatre, New York City, 1913
- Rialto Theatre, New York City, 1916
- Ridgewood Theatre, Ridgewood, New York, 1916
- Rivoli Theatre, New York City, 1917
- Stanley Theatre, Utica, New York, 1928
- State Theatre, Uniontown, Pennsylvania, 1922
- Strand Theatre, Lakewood, New Jersey, 1922
- Tivoli Theatre, Washington, DC, 1924
- Victoria Theater, New York City, 1917
- Warner Theatre, Torrington, Connecticut, 1931
- Warner's Hollywood Theatre, New York City, 1930
- Ziegfeld Theatre, New York City (with Joseph Urban), 1927

=== Canada ===
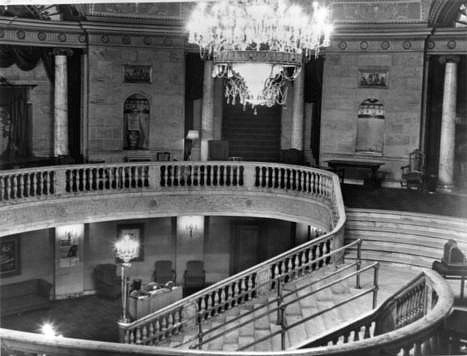
Lobby of Capitol Cinema, in Ottawa, Ontario, Canada 1920; demolished 1970

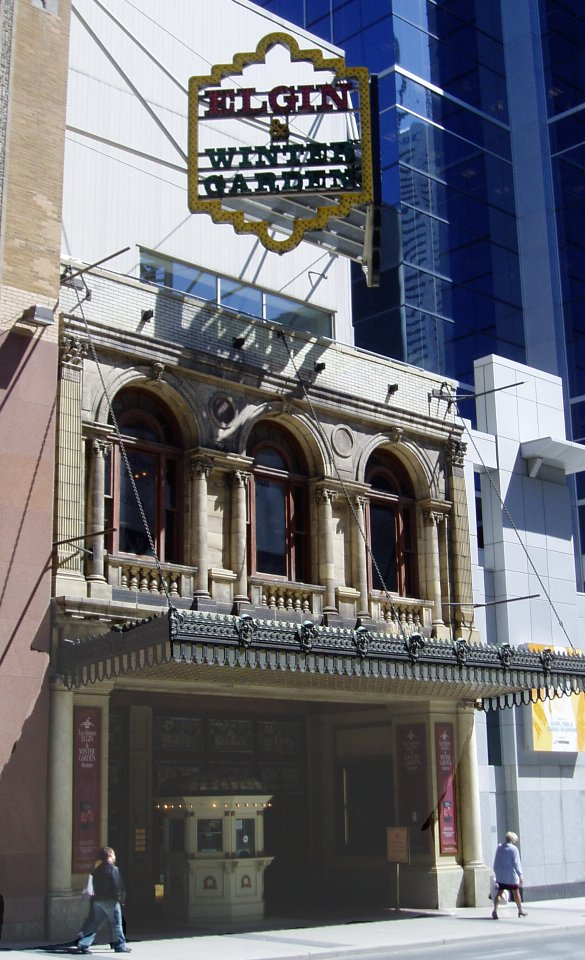
Elgin and Winter Garden Theatres double-decker vaudeville theatres Toronto, Ontario 1913-1914

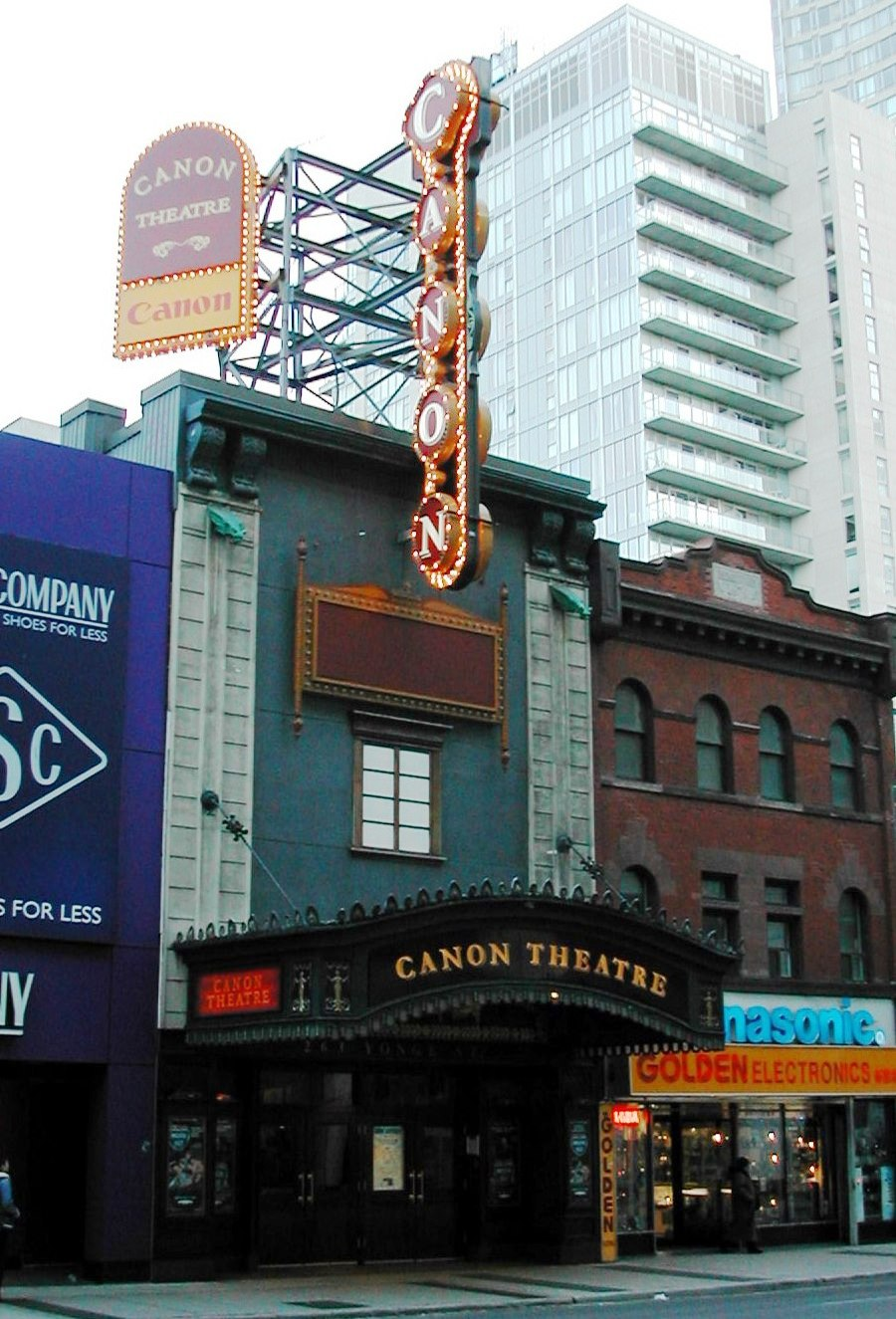
The Canon Theatre (now Ed Mirvish Theatre), Toronto, Ontario, 1920
- Elgin and Winter Garden Theatres, Toronto, 1913
- The Sanderson Centre, Brantford, Ontario, 1919; auditorium restored in 1990, currently a performing arts centre
- Capitol Theatre, Hamilton, Ontario, 1920; 103 King Street East, Hamilton all but lobby demolished in 1973; remaining portion of theatre now operating as Escape Manor Inc.
- Capitol Theatre (Windsor, Ontario), 1920; currently a performing arts centre.
- Pantages Theatre, Toronto, Ontario, 1920
- Uptown Theatre, Toronto, Ontario, 1920; demolished in 2003

=== India ===
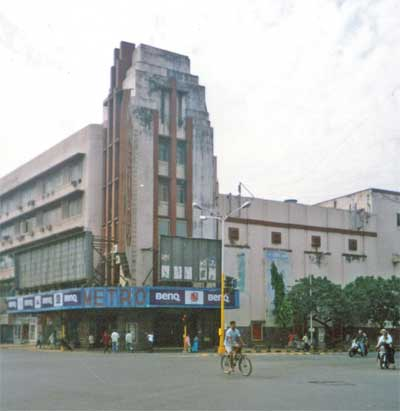
Metro Cinema, Mumbai, India

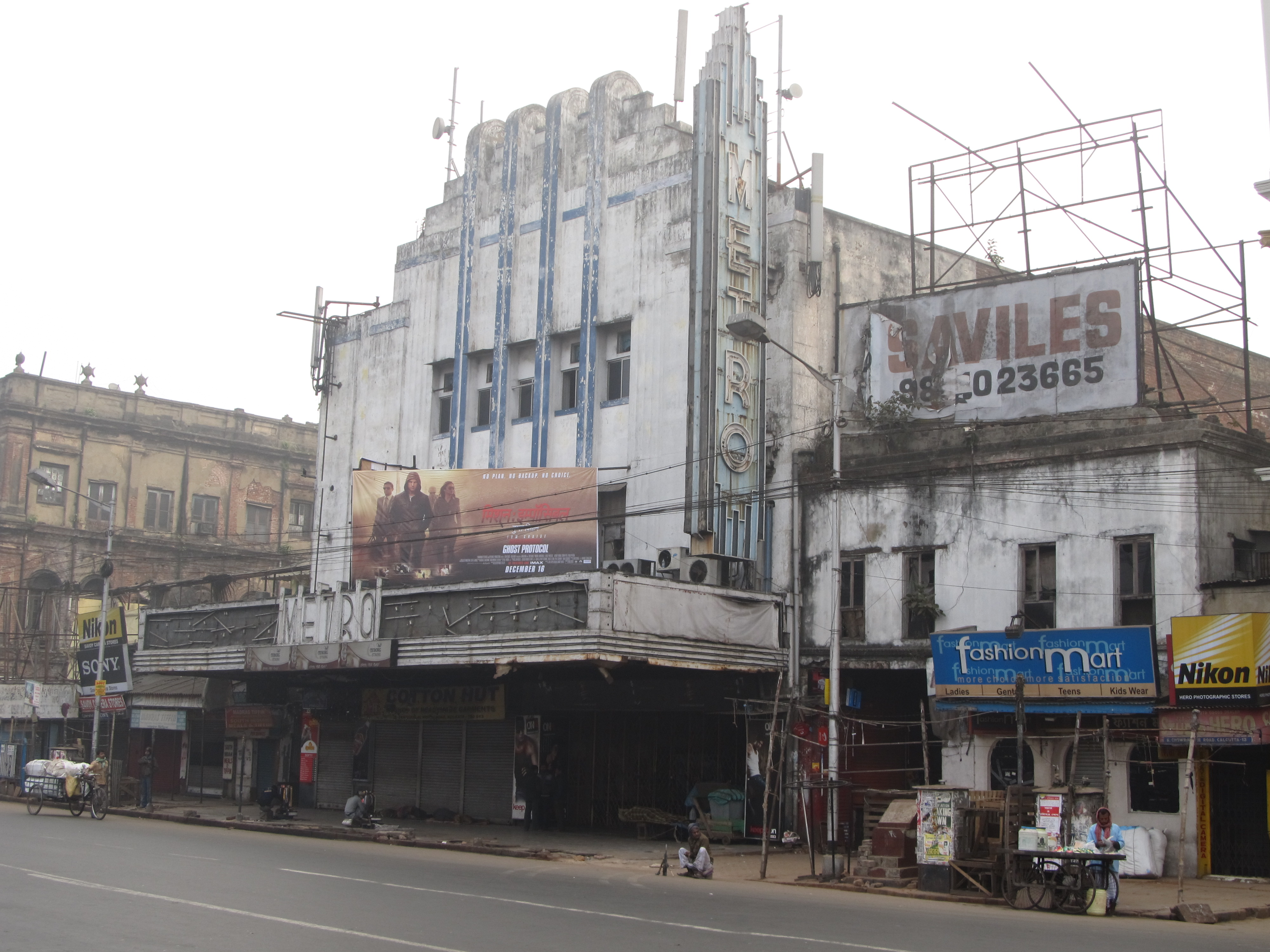
Metro Cinema, Kolkata (Calcutta), 2010
- Metro Cinema, Mumbai, Maharashtra, 1938
- Metro Cinema, Kolkata (Calcutta), West Bengal, 1935; Currently being renovated.

== Residential architecture ==
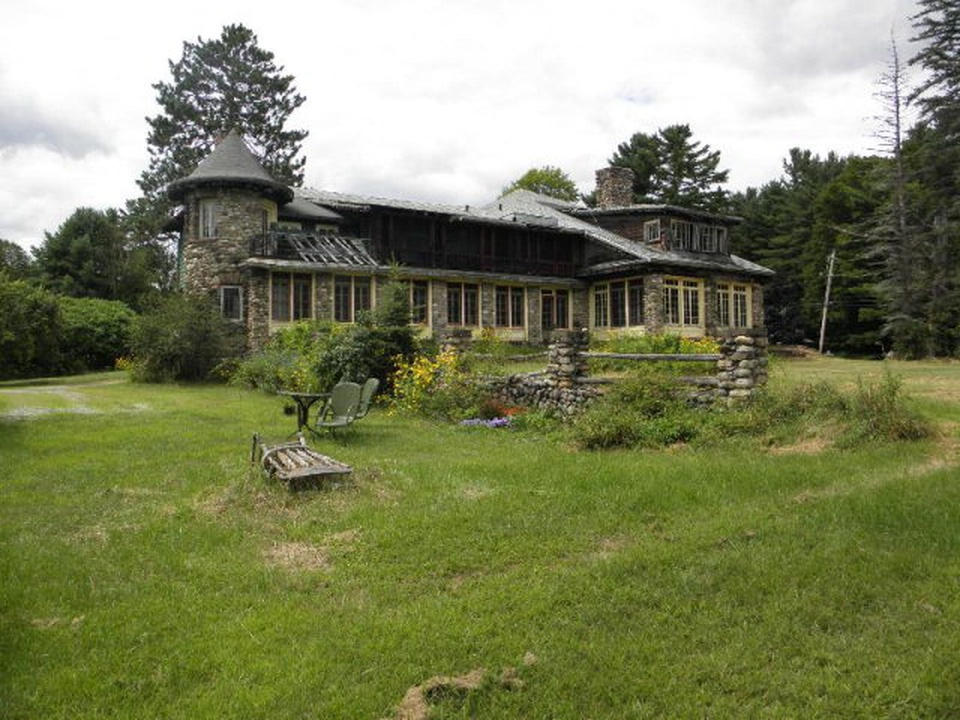
Thomas W. Lamb Residence

In 1920, Lamb designed for himself a private summer home in the Adirondacks in the village of Elizabethtown, New York. The house, which is still extant as a residence, is situated on the Boquet River. The eight-bedroom manor, referred to today as Cobble Mountain Lodge, is a shingle and cobble stone design marked by the inclusion of a stone turret.
