= RKO Proctor's Theater (New Rochelle) =

Movie theater in Westchester County, New York

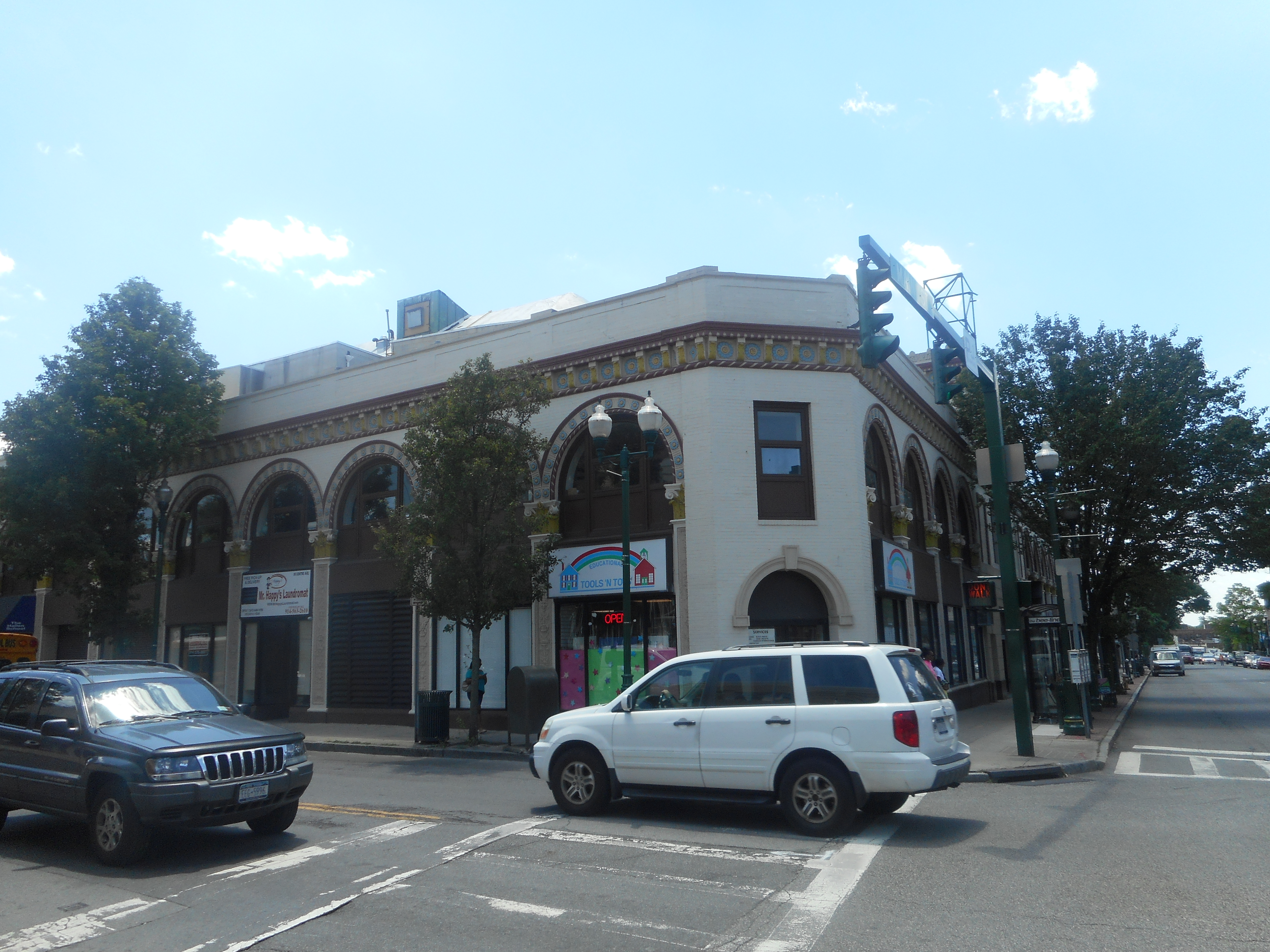
- Theater as seen from the southwest corner of Main Street and Center Avenue
- Interactive map of RKO Proctor's Theater
- Address: 572 - 80 Main Street; New Rochelle, New York; United States
- Coordinates: 40.906811°N 73.784167°W
- Capacity: 2,800
- Type: Movie palace
- Current use: offices/ retail

Construction
- Opened: 1927
- Closed: 1990
- Architect: Herbert J. Krapp

RKO Proctor's Theater is a historic movie theater located on Main Street in New Rochelle in Westchester County, New York. Herbert J. Krapp designed the brick structure using a Renaissance motif with retail stores housed under two-story "blind arches", a feature borrowed from Stanford White’s Madison Square Garden. Completed in 1927, this movie palace and vaudeville house featured a luxurious 2,800 seat interior with 4 screens. A Wurlitzer organ was installed in the theater in 1927 and was used to accompany silent movies and for intermissions and shows. After the invention of talking movies the organ was abandoned and later sold.

The theater hosted numerous performances by performers and celebrities such as George Burns and Gracie Allen, as well as Sophie Tucker, Eddie Cantor, and Georgie Jessel. In 1950 Bela Lugosi appeared at the theater and performed his Horror and Magic Show. Jerry Lewis appeared onstage on July 12, 1961, for the opening of his second feature film as a director, The Ladies Man. In 1962 the Three Stooges appeared at the theater to promote their film The Three Stooges Meet Hercules.

The building is included on the Historic Theater Inventory of the League of Historic American Theatres and is also recognized as part of the New York State Movie Theater Corridor, a statewide listing of 122 historically significant theaters.
