= Herbert J. Krapp =

American architect (1887–1973)

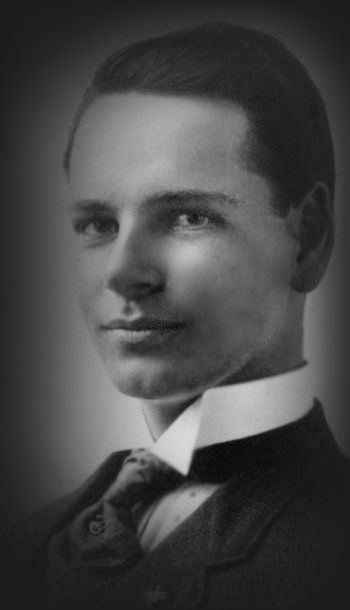
- Born: February 21, 1886; New York City, U.S.
- Died: February 16, 1973 (aged 86); Florida, U.S.
- Known for: Theatre architecture, especially on Broadway
- Spouse: Elaine Tuska

Herbert J. Krapp (1887–1973) was a 20th-century theatre architect and designer, notable for his contributions to Broadway theater district architecture. Known for his innovative approach to design, his built work favors width, rather than depth, to create better sightlines for an "intimate theatre" experience.

Of the 41 Broadway theatres now standing, Krapp designed 13 and redesigned two. All of his extant Broadway theatres' interiors, and nearly all of their exteriors, have since been designated historic landmarks by the New York City Landmarks Preservation Commission.

== Career ==
A graduate of Cooper Union, and an apprentice with the Herts & Tallant firm until 1915, Krapp began working in theatre architecture at the time when architects were just beginning to design "a playhouse's exterior and interior as a single, integrated design." His functional innovations include orchestra-level stadium seating, and single, rather than double, balconies above it.

He favored neoclassical façades, incorporating elements, such as ornamental iron balconies, patterned brickwork and grilles, as well as decorative pilasters, cornices, arches and frieze. A frequent user of the Adam style, sometimes complemented with Elizabethan, Mediterranean, Mission or other revival elements, Krapp's interiors made regular use of recessed ceilings, wall columns and ornamental wall panels, decorated with floral or geometric motifs.

Sometime between 1912 and 1916, in addition to designing theatres for the Chanin brothers, Krapp began working directly with the Shubert brothers. His first independent commissions for them were the Broadhurst and the neighboring Plymouth Theatre (now known as the Schoenfeld), which opened within two weeks of each other, and were designed as mirror images of each other. Krapp would eventually become their primary architect, designing the Lyceum, Shubert, Booth, New Amsterdam and Longacre Theatres, among many others.

Krapp was well known for his ability to use his building space to its fullest potential. For the Majestic Theatre, Krapp incorporated stadium seating into the plans for the orchestra level, creating better sightlines and allowing for the creation of larger lounge and lobby areas. He designed the Ambassador Theatre on a diagonal plan to fit it into a small site. Krapp renovated the Winter Garden Theatre and the Helen Hayes Theatre in the 1920s. He also designed the Hotel Edison, the Lincoln Hotel (now the Row NYC Hotel), and numerous other buildings.

Although the stock market crash of 1929 brought an end to the theatre building boom, Krapp remained with the Shuberts until 1963, supervising the maintenance and renovations of the existing venues. He also experimented with inventing; one of the tools he created was patented and used by the U.S. Air Force. He died in Florida in 1973.

== Broadway façades ==
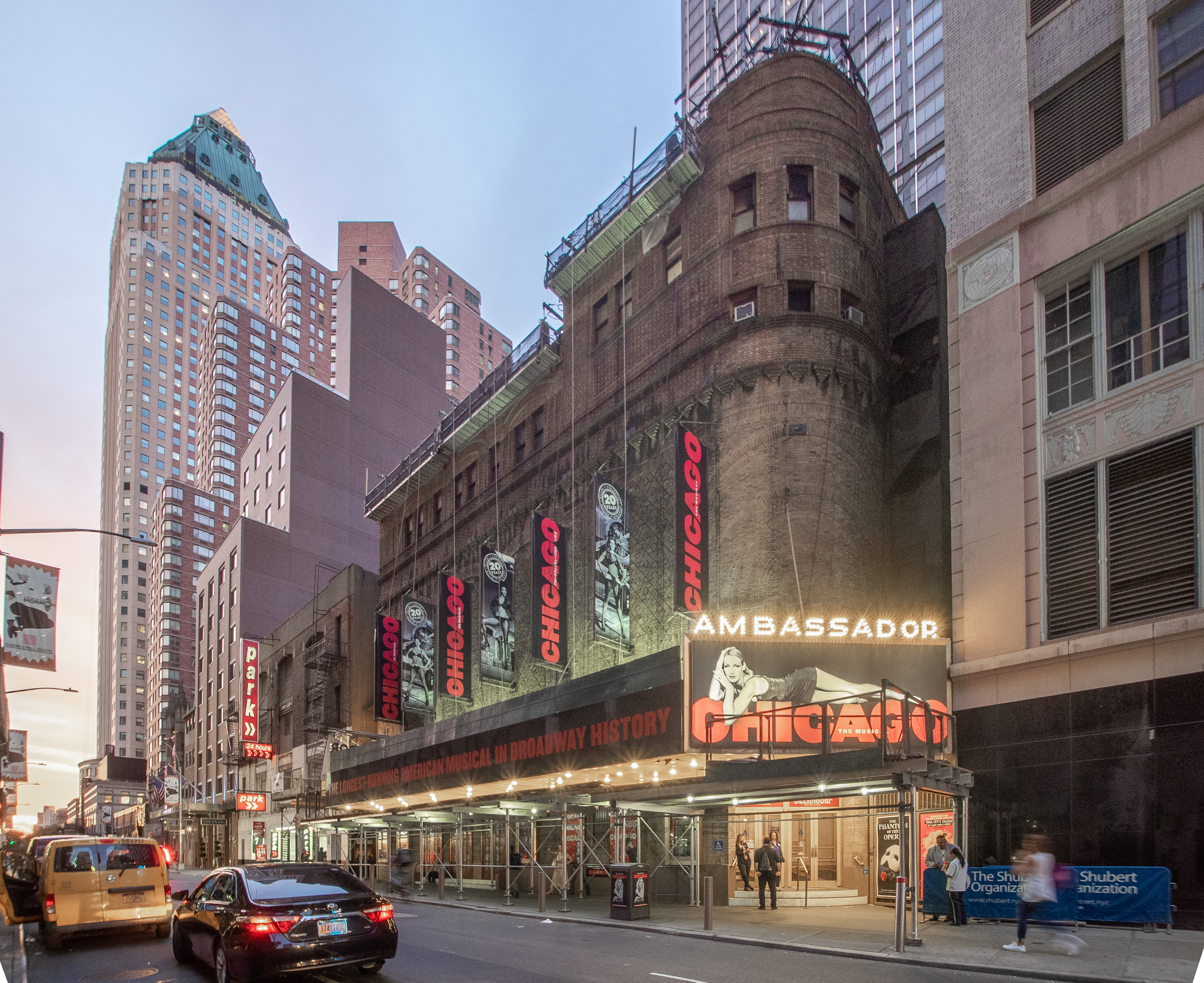
Ambassador Theatre

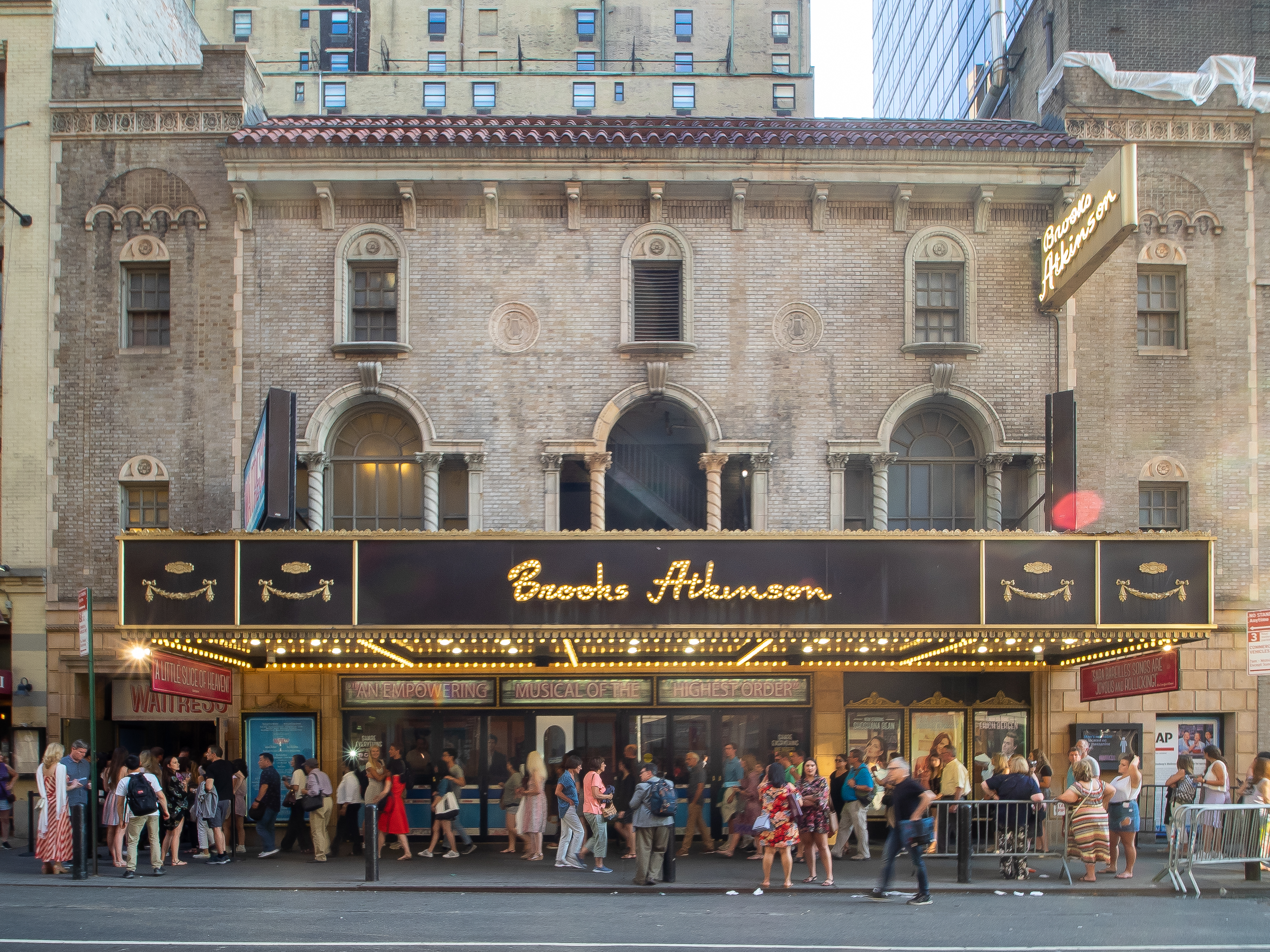
Lena Horne Theatre

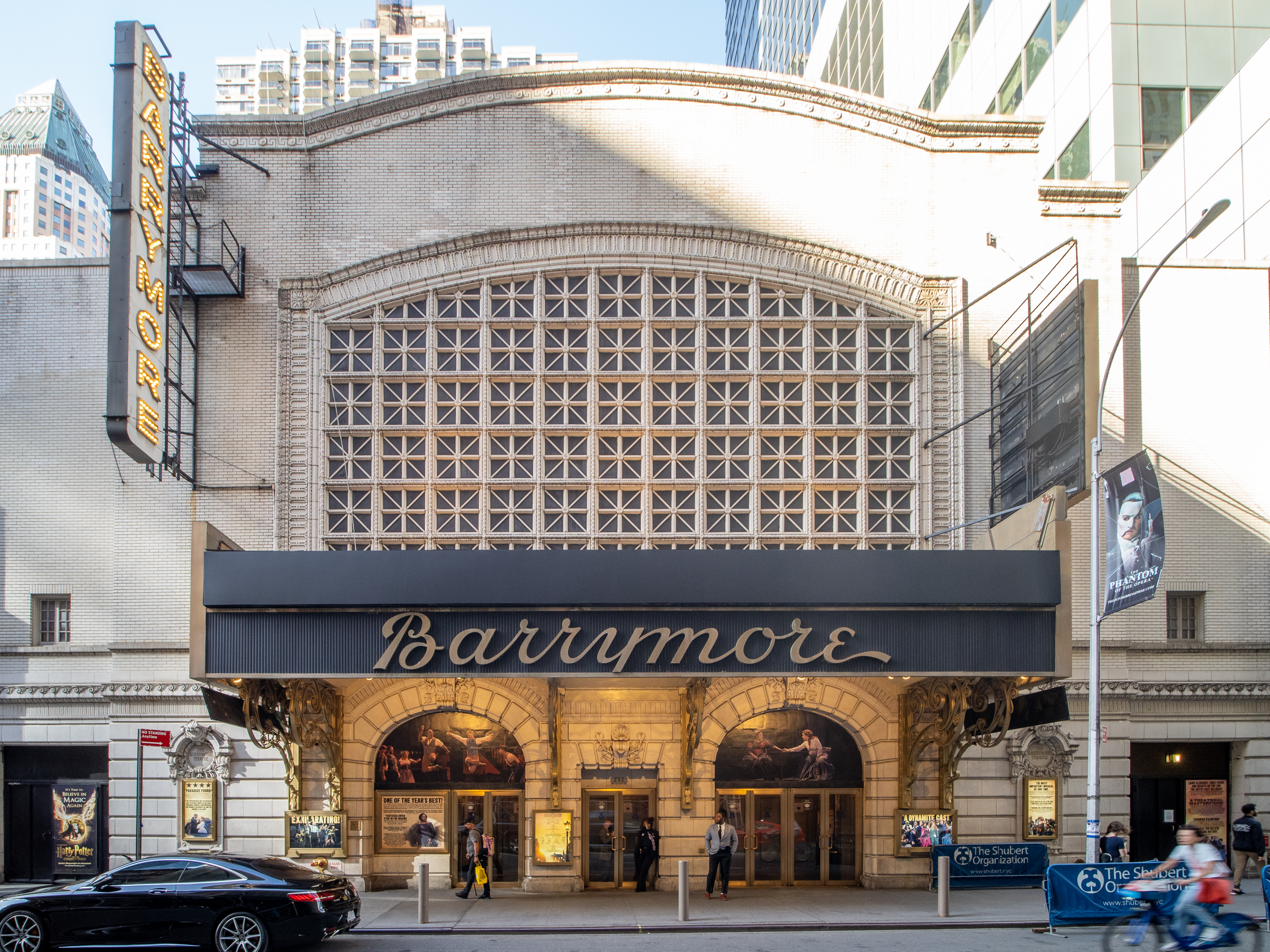
Barrymore Theatre

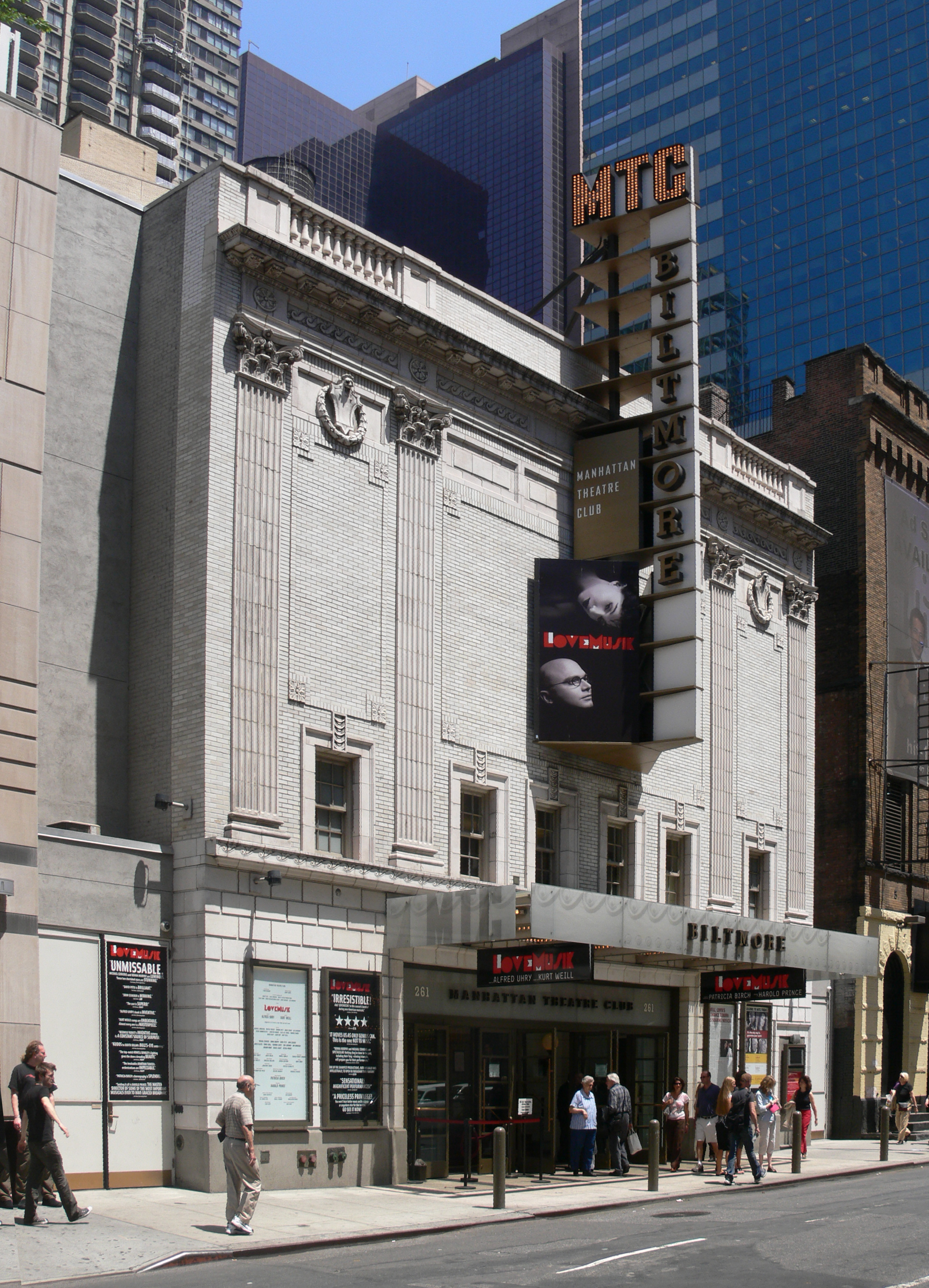
Biltmore Theatre

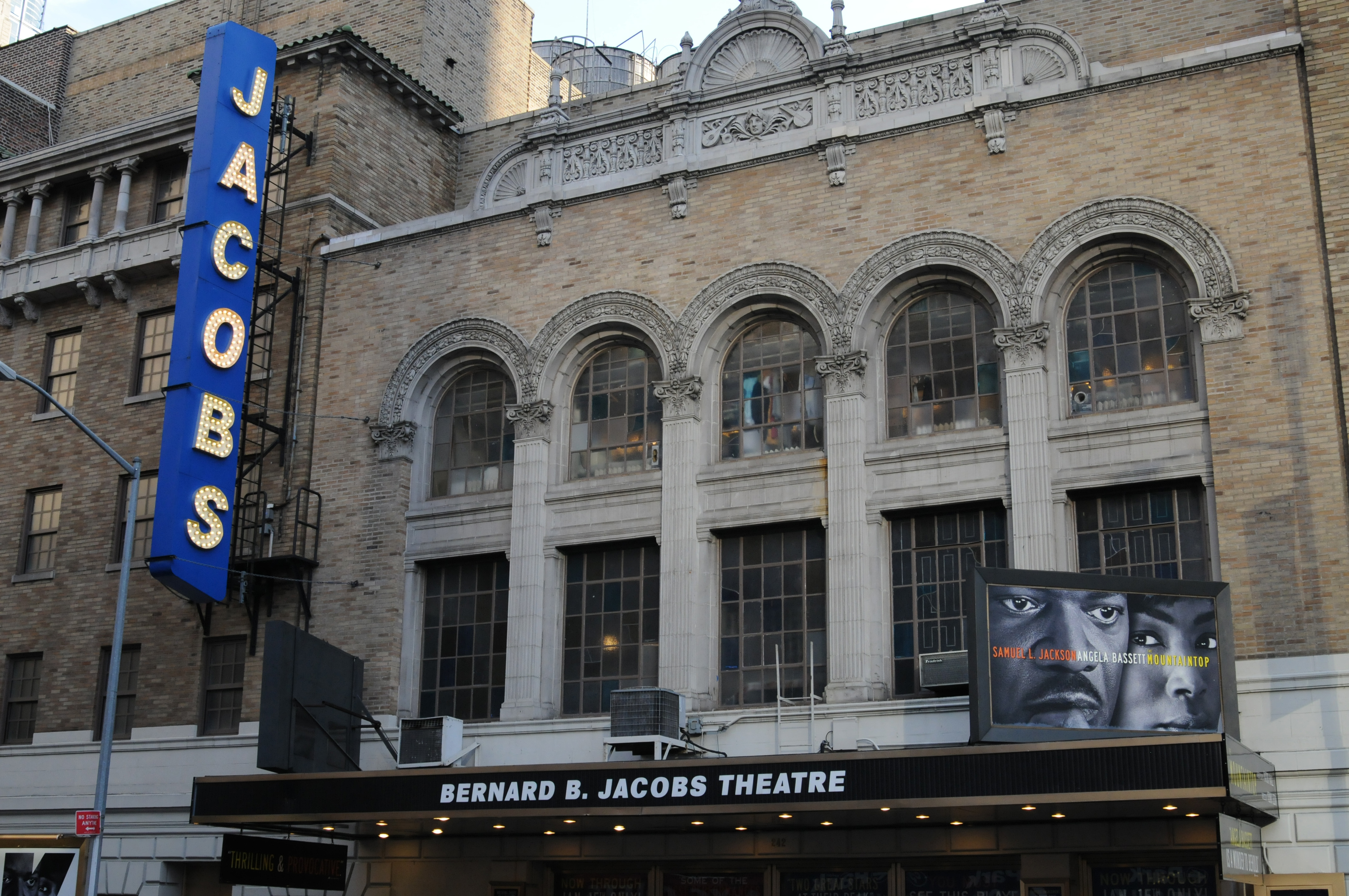
Jacobs Theatre

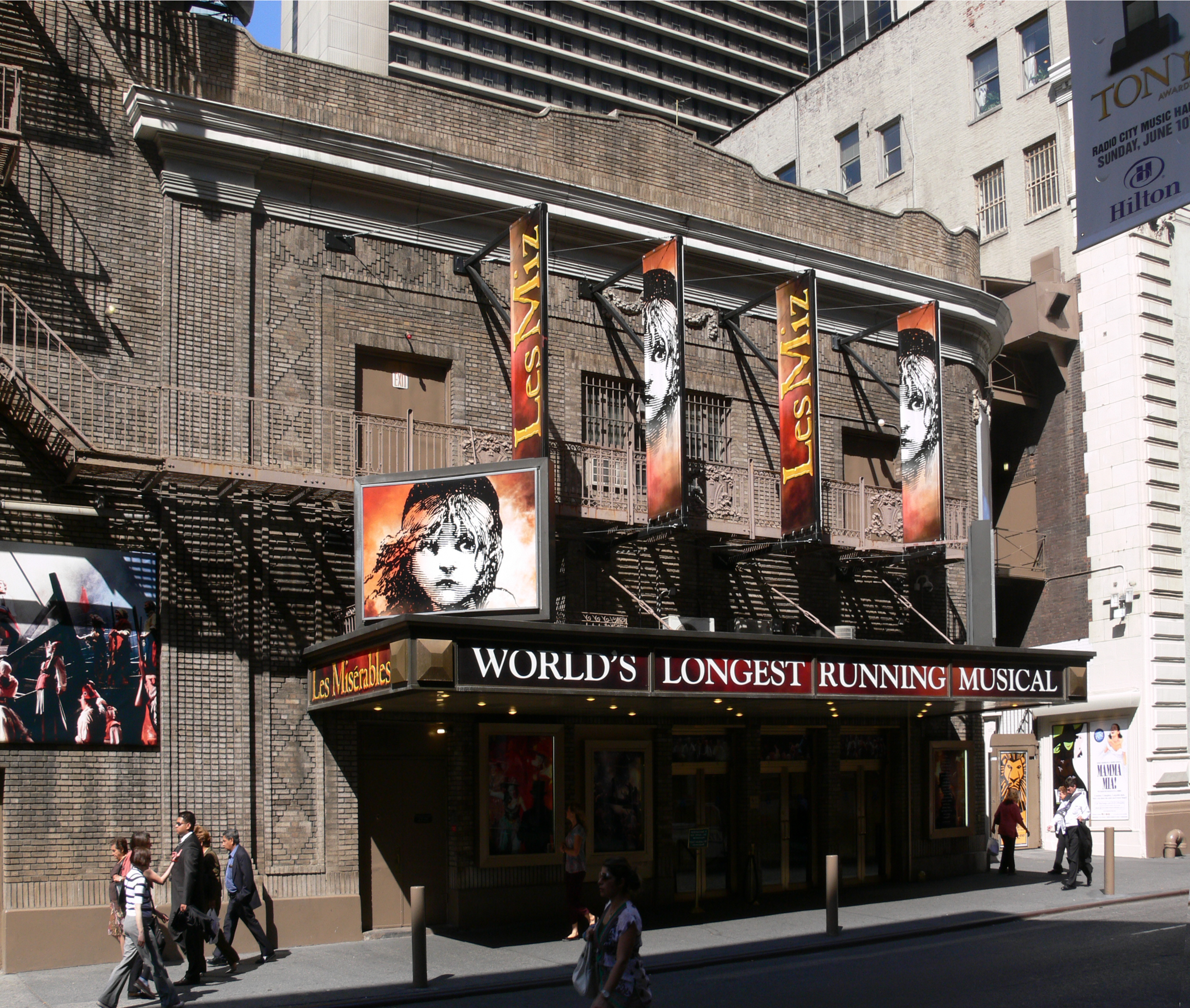
Broadhurst Theatre

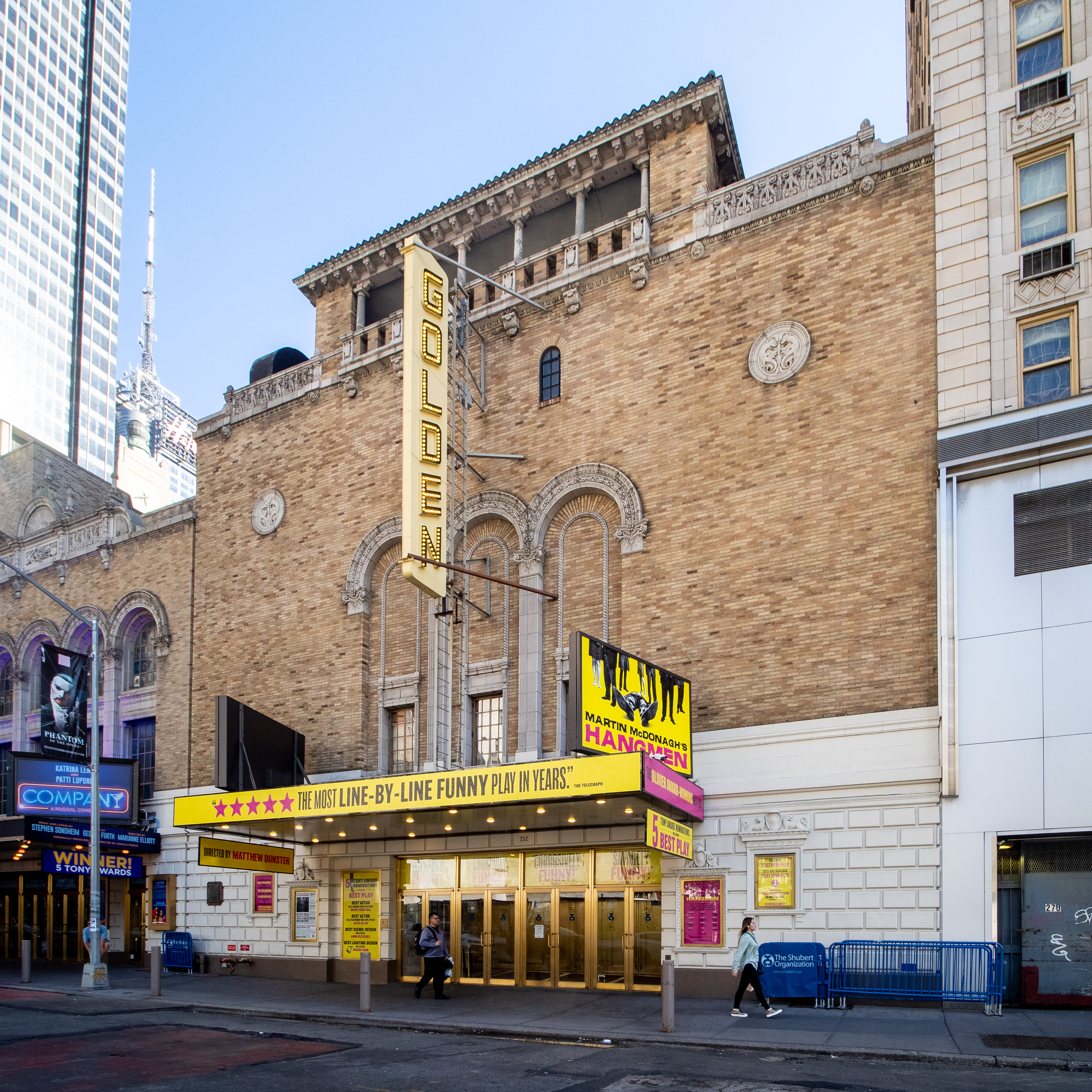
Golden Theatre

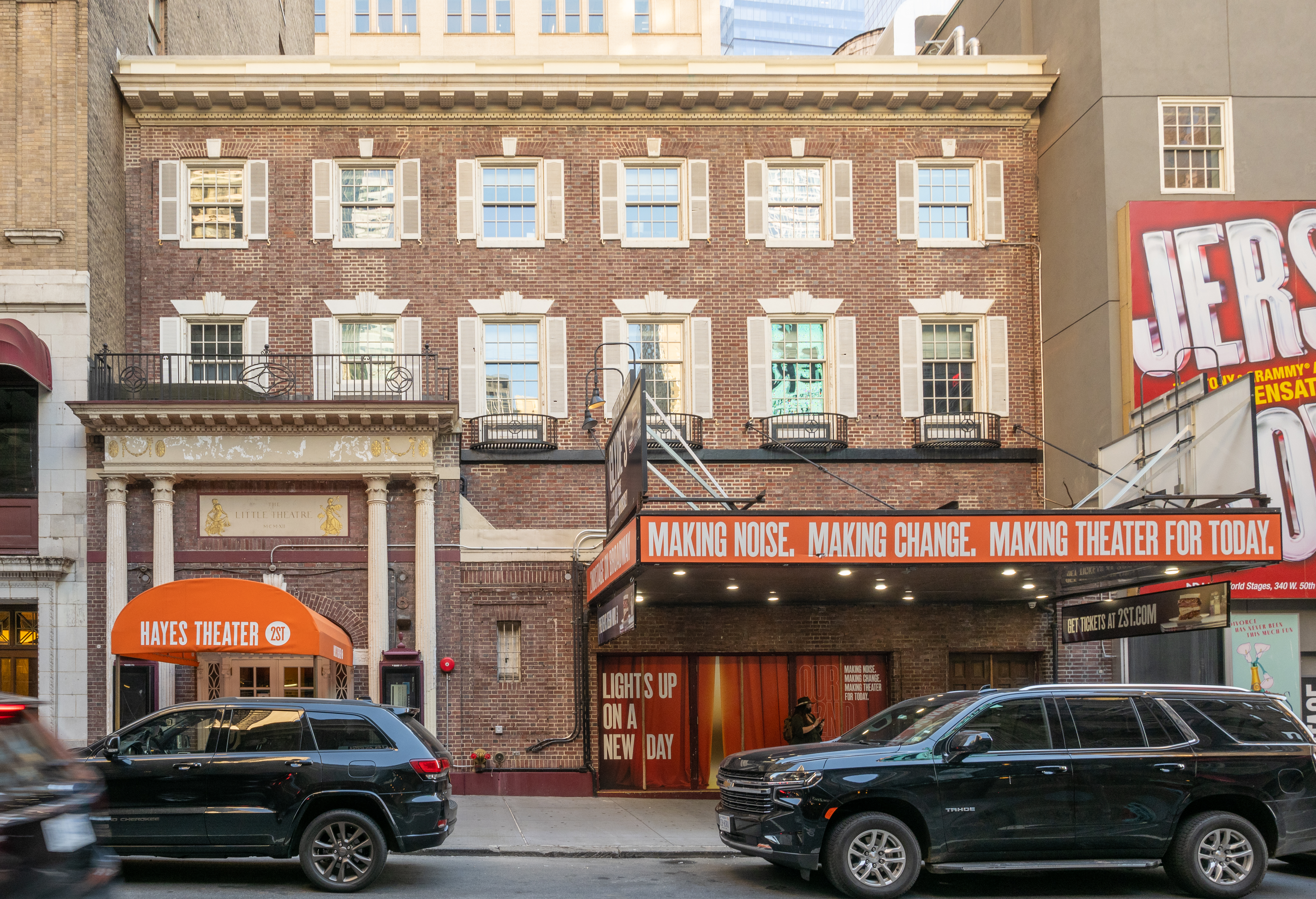
Hayes Theatre

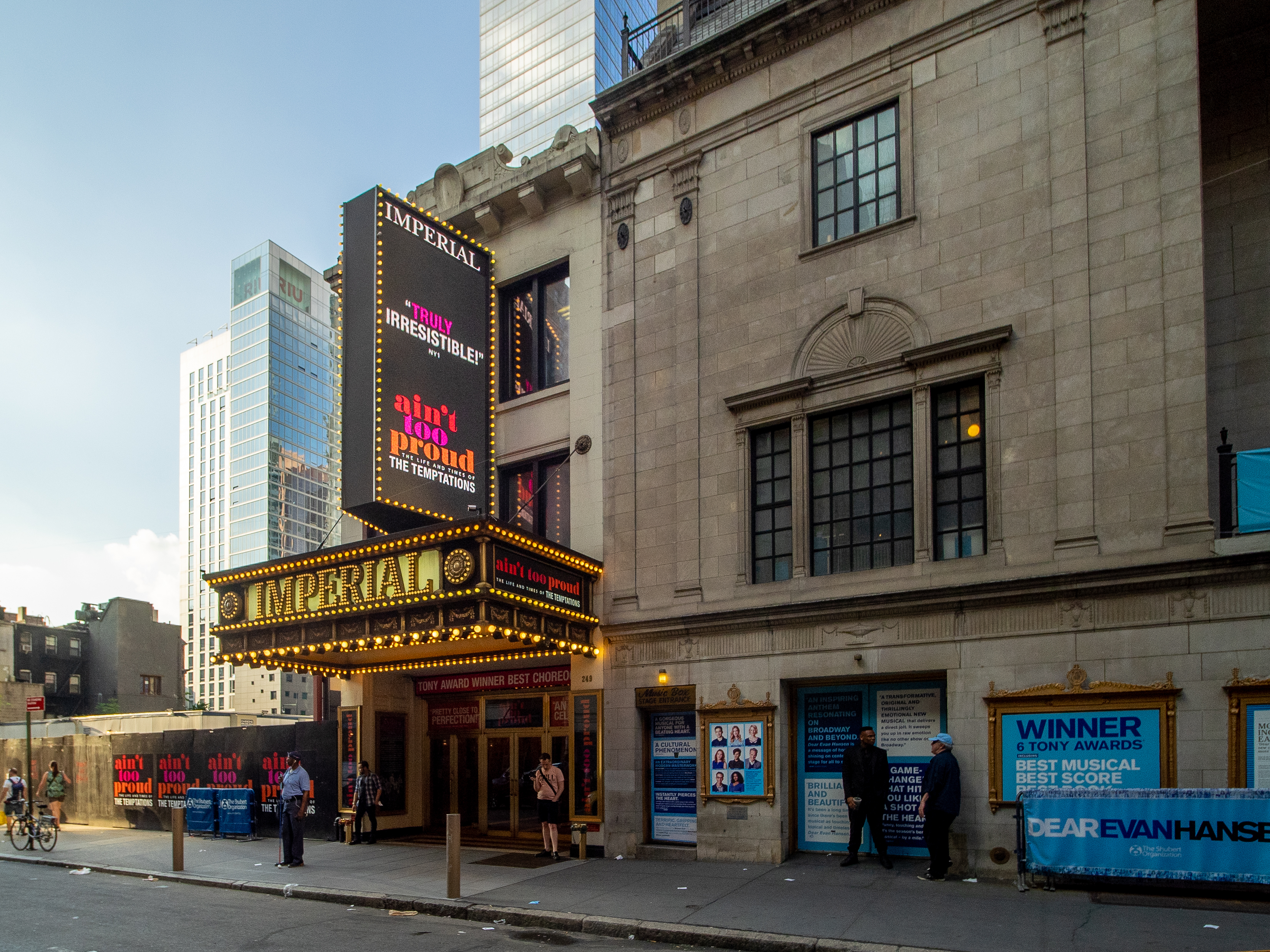
Imperial Theatre

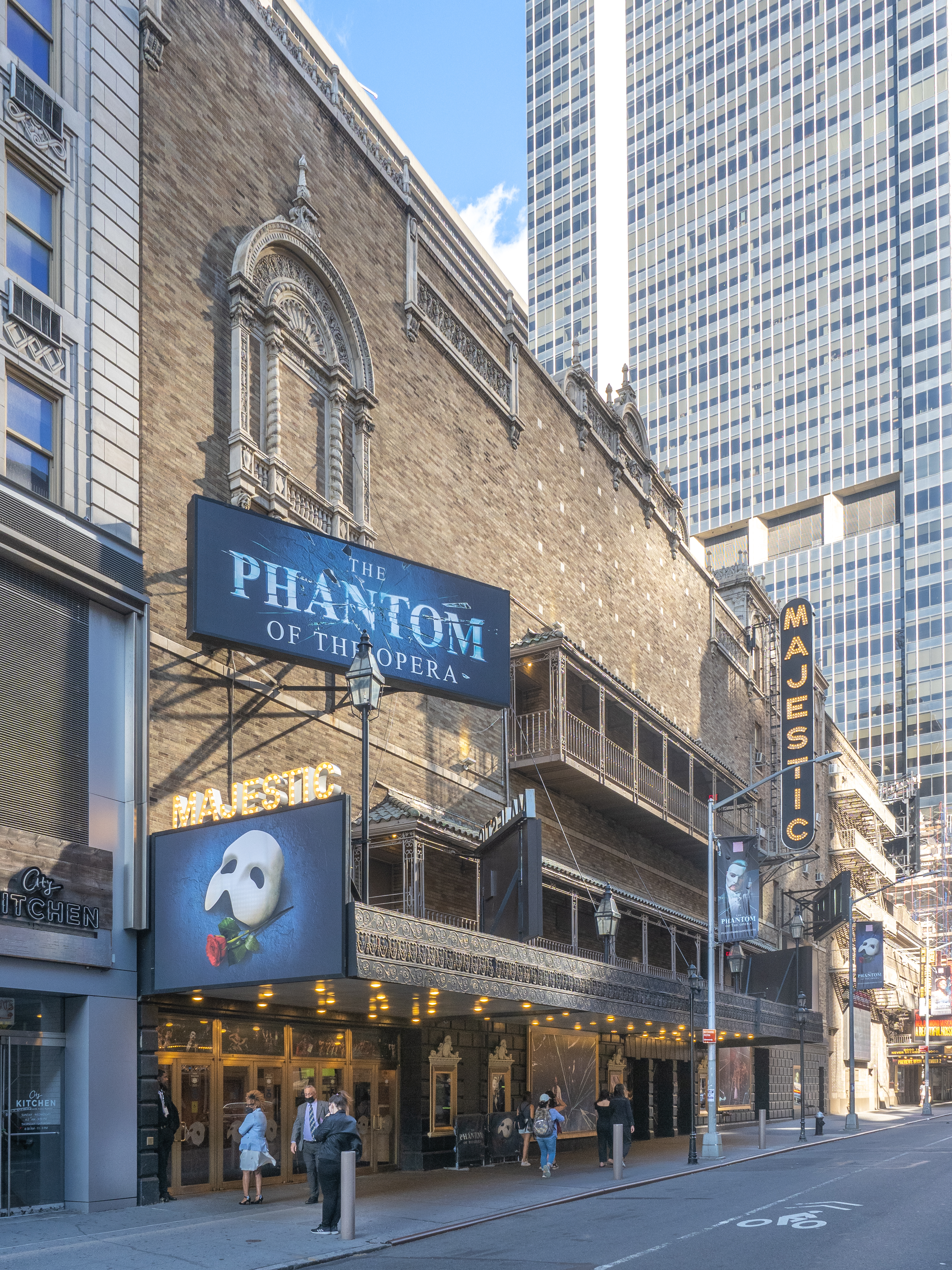
Majestic Theatre

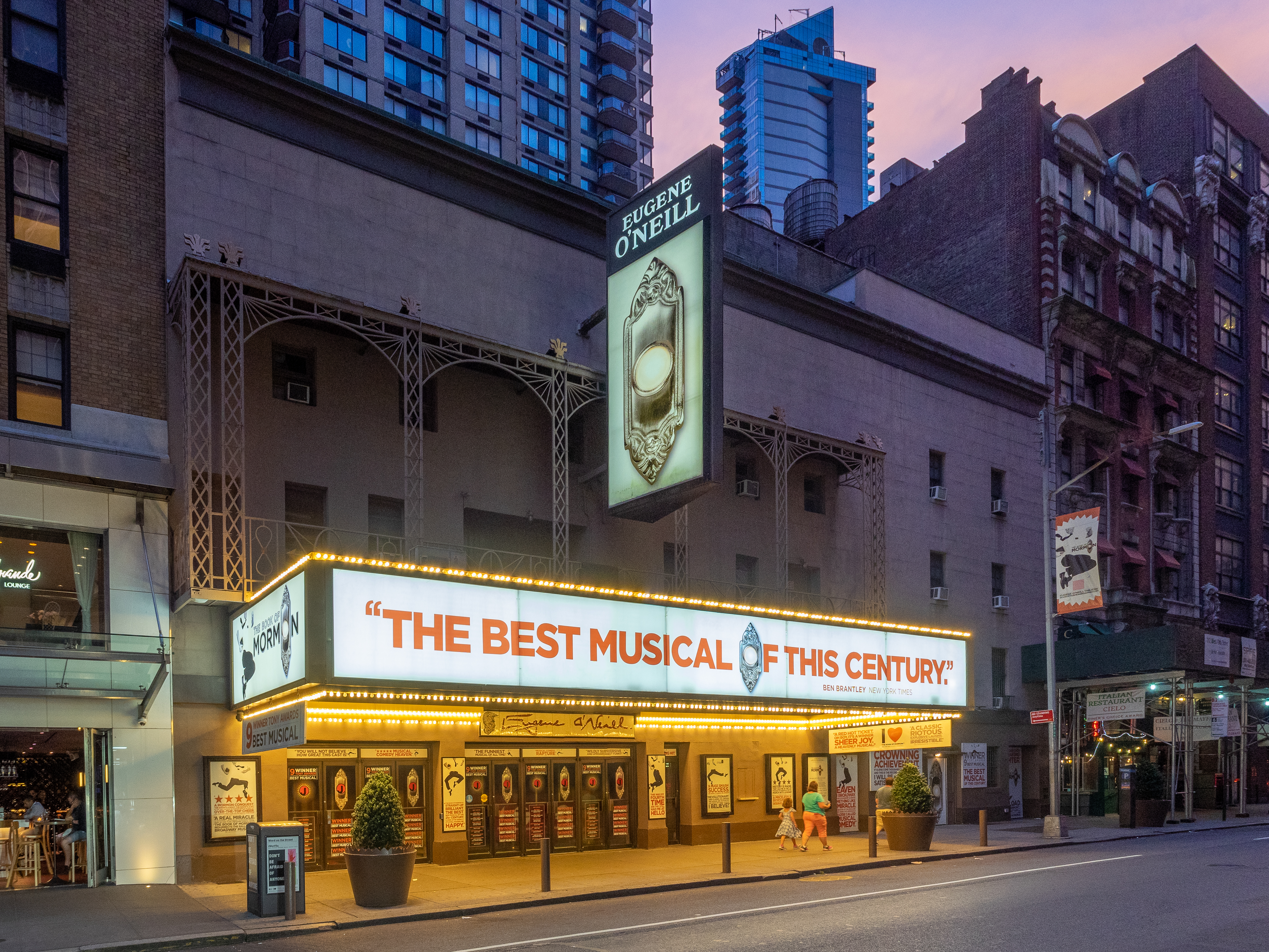
Eugene O'Neill Theatre

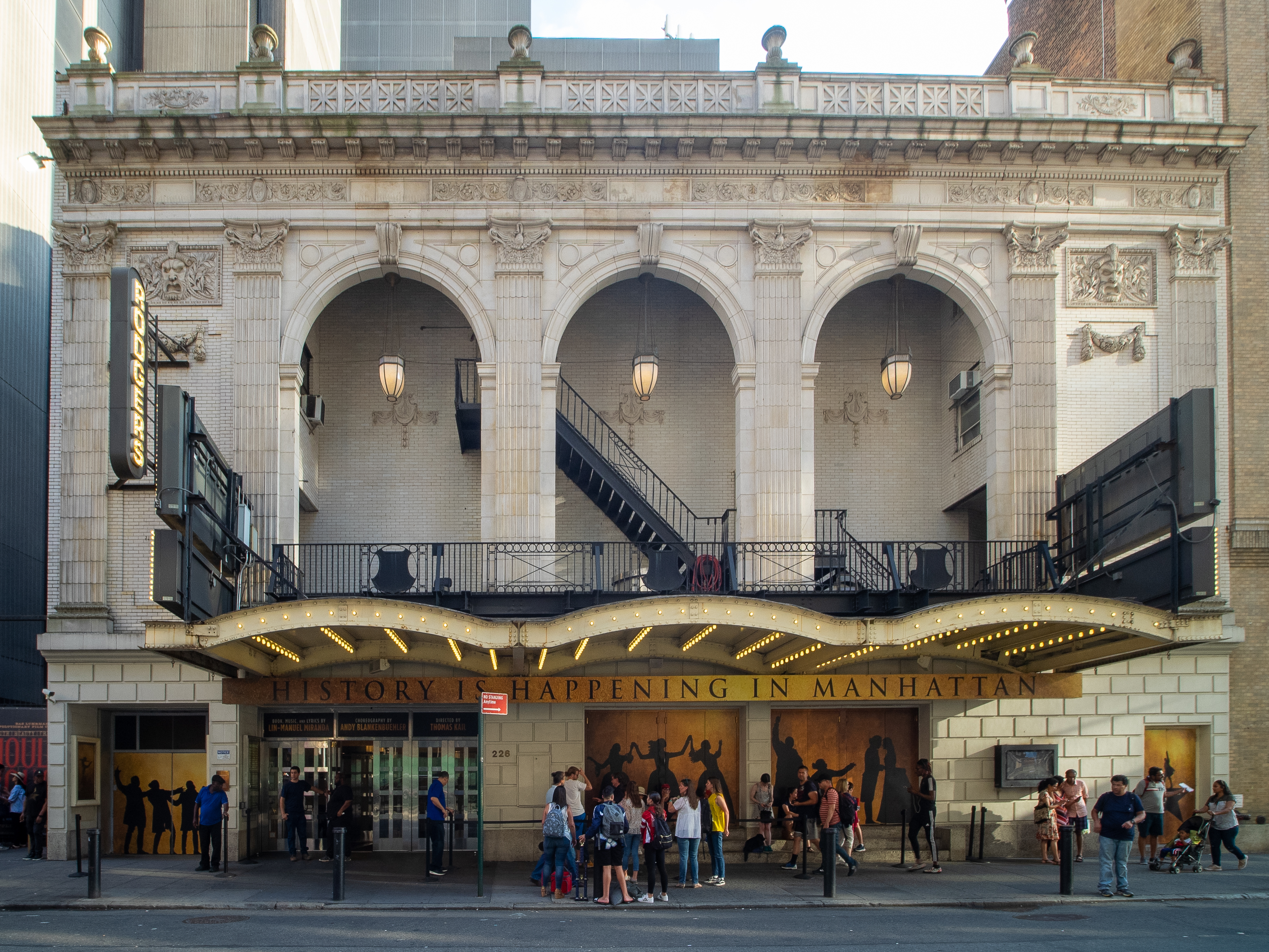
Richard Rodgers Theatre

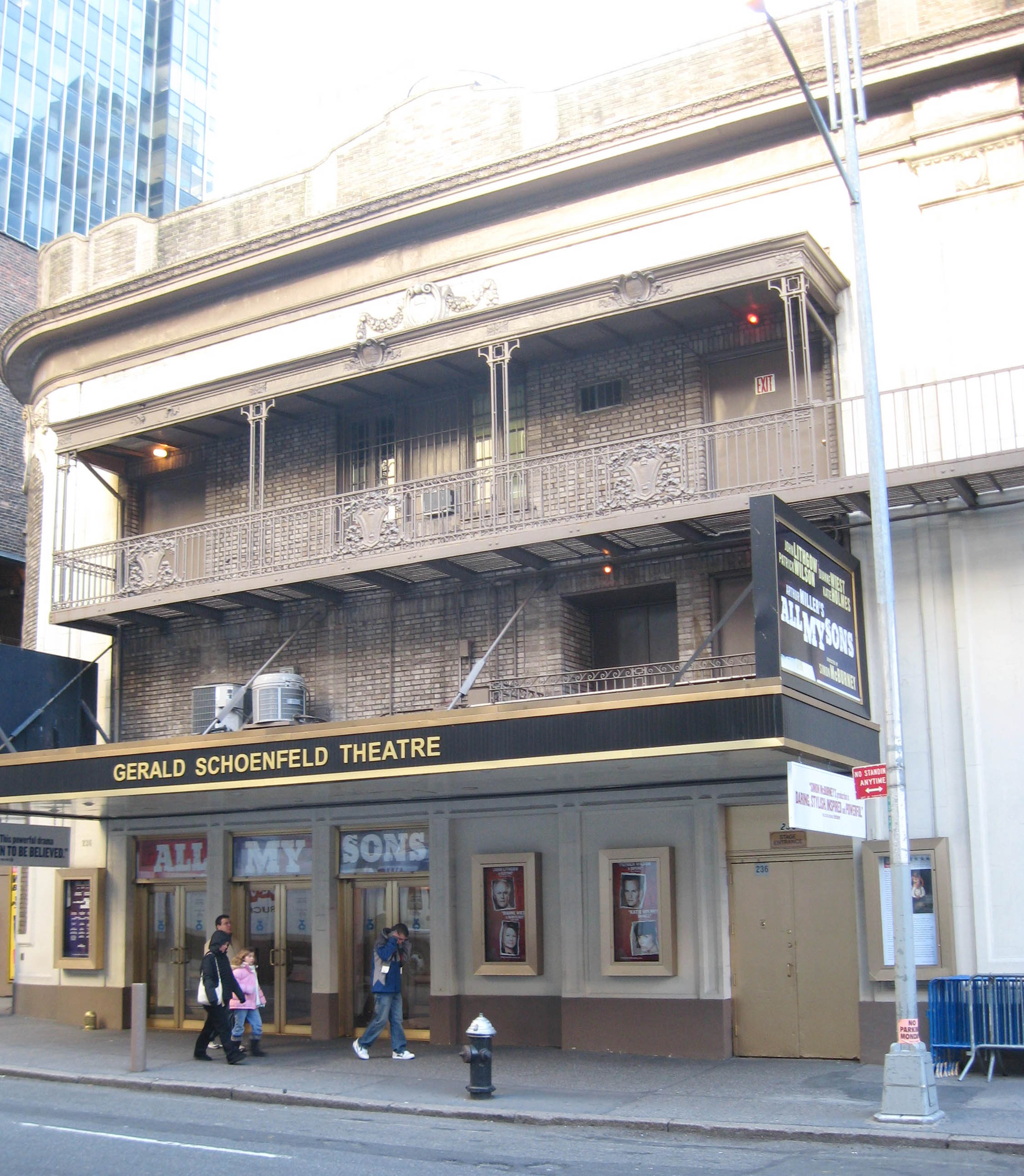
Gerald Schoenfeld Theatre

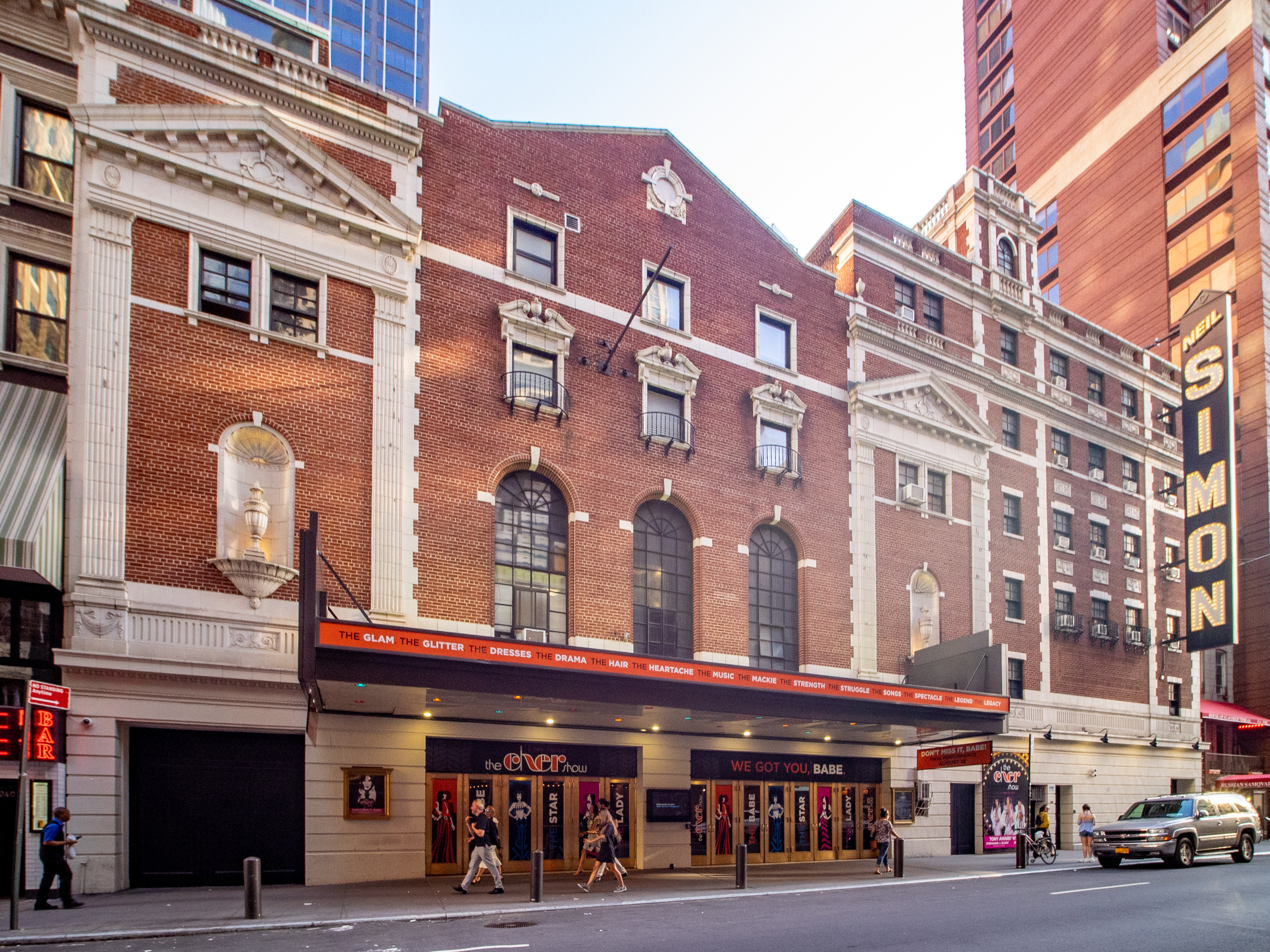
Neil Simon Theatre

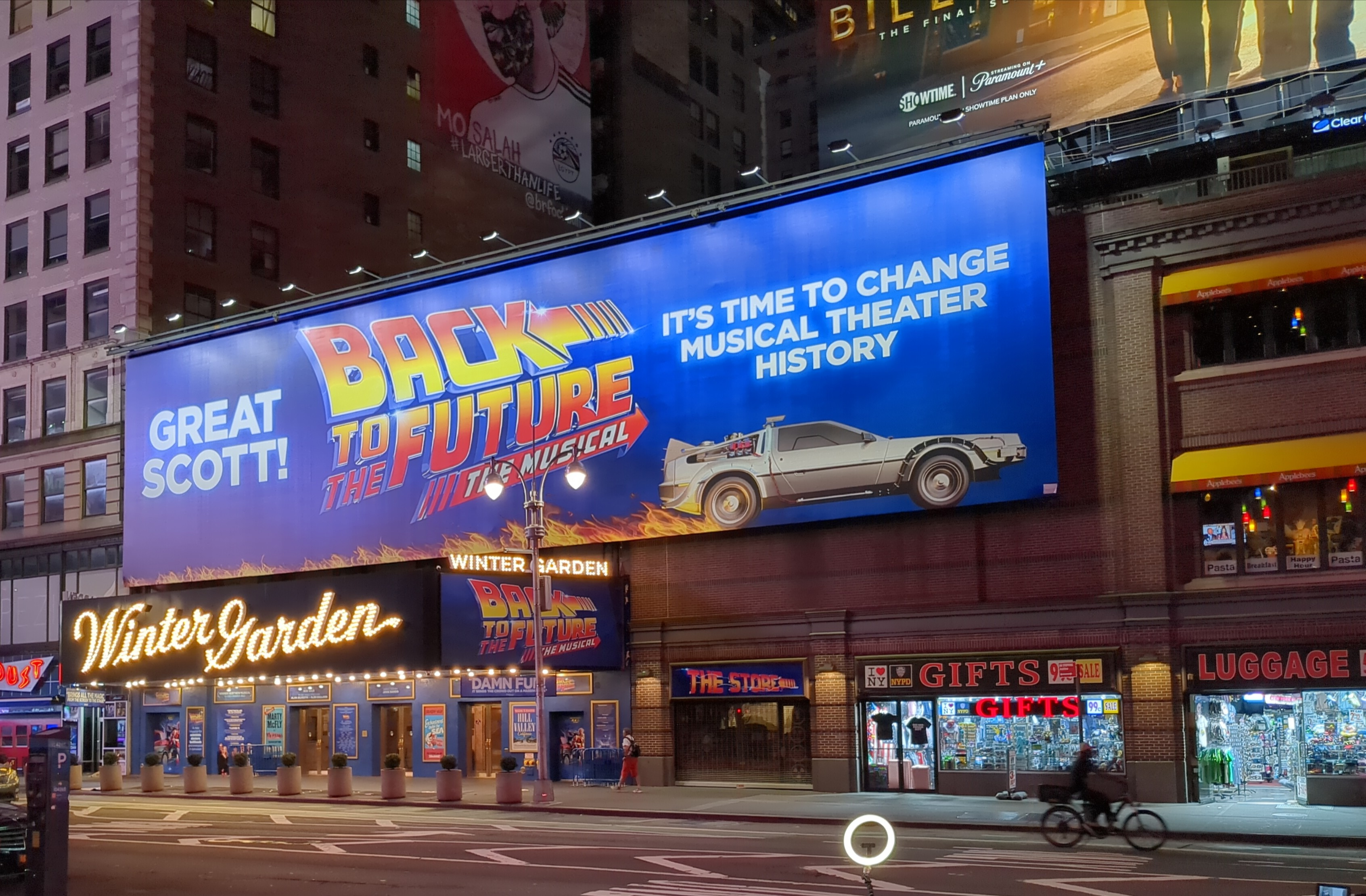
Winter Garden Theatre

== Theatres and hotels ==
Current Broadway theatres

- Ambassador Theatre
- Lena Horne Theatre
- Ethel Barrymore Theatre
- Biltmore Theatre
- Bernard B. Jacobs Theatre
- Broadhurst Theatre
- John Golden Theatre
- Helen Hayes Theatre (redesign)
- Imperial Theatre
- Majestic Theatre
- Eugene O'Neill Theatre
- Richard Rodgers Theatre
- Gerald Schoenfeld Theatre
- Neil Simon Theatre
- Winter Garden Theatre (redesign)

Other notable buildings

- Ed Sullivan Theater (originally Hammerstein's Theater; New York)
- Forrest Theatre (Philadelphia)
- Hotel Edison (New York)
- Lincoln Hotel (New York)
- Morosco Theatre (New York; demolished 1982)
- The Sardi's Building (New York)
- RKO Proctor's Theater (New Rochelle, New York)
- Folly Theater, Kansas City, Missouri (renovation)
- Loew's Woodside Theatre (1926), partially adaptively reused as St. Sebastian Roman Catholic Church (Queens, New York).
- Boulevard Theater (Jackson Heights, New York)
- Central Theatre (New York City)

== External links and resources ==
- Short history
- Partial listing of theatre credits at Cinema Treasures
- Broadway Theatres: History and Architecture, William Morrison, 1999, Dover Publications, ISBN 0-486-40244-4
- Lost Broadway Theatres, Nicholas Van Hoogstraten, Princeton Architectural Press, 1997, ISBN 1-56898-116-3
- The Shuberts Present: 100 Years of American Theater, Maryann Chach, Reagan Fletcher, Mark Evan Swartz, Sylvia Wang, Harry N. Abrams, 2001, ISBN 0-8109-0614-7
- Shubert Organization Theatres
