= Andrew Bridgmont =

English actor, playwright and stage director

- Education: Central Saint Martins & Waldorf education
- Occupation: Actor
- Years active: 1994–present
- Height: 1.73 m (5 ft 8 in)
- Father: Peter Bridgmont
- Website: IMDB Page

Andrew Bridgmont is an English actor, playwright and stage director, son of thespian and author Peter Bridgmont (January 1929 - 24 June 2019). He is primarily known for his theatre work like at the Globe Theatre and appearing in such films as Matthew Vaughn's Kingsman: The Secret Service (2014), James Marsh's The Theory of Everything (2014) or TV series like Penny Dreadful (2014–2016) or Grandchester. Bridgmont was the winner of the International Playwriting Festival award for Red on Black.

== Education ==
Bridgmont did an arts foundation course, and later graduated from the Royal Academy of Arts in London. He took part in workshops at Ovalhouse in Lambeth. Bridgmont is also a classically trained violinist.

== Theatre ==
=== Director ===
Title	Year	Role	Director or Venue	Notes	Ref.
Summer of Love	2018	Director	St James Theatre	actor Thomas Brodie-Sangster playing Kenneth and Claire Porter as Kenneth's mum Rebecca; Damont Prods.	
Summer of Love	2012	Director	King's Head Theatre	actor Thomas Brodie-Sangster playing Kenneth and Claire Porter as Kenneth's mum Rebecca; Damont Prods.	
Richard III	2011	Director	Central school of speech and drama	Damont Productions	
The Golden Hour	2014	Director	St James Theatre	Damont Productions	
Tales from the Coast	2011	Director	King's Head Theatre	Damont Productions	
Someone Who'll Watch Over Me	2008	Director	Globe Theatre and Stara Prochownia in Warsaw	Damont Productions	

=== Actor ===
Title	Year	Role	Venue	Director - Notes	Ref.
The Wider Earth	2018	The Reverend Henslow; Sir John Herschel & the sailor.	The 'Darwin Centre' at The Natural History Museum	2 hours10 min.	
The Caucasian Chalk Circle	2018	Mother / Lawyer andothers	Royal Lyceum Theatre	Mark Thomson (director), Simon Wilkinson (lighting design), Claire McKenzie (composer) Karen Tennant (designer).	
Comus	2016	Earl of Bridgewater	The Globe Theatre	Lucy Bailey	
Solos and chorus without harmony	2013	Tony Blair	Royal Court Theatre	Richard Bradberry; also starring Sasha Behar, Aidan Casey, Ralf Togneri and Martin Turner.	
Doctor Faustus	2007	Vega / Cornelius / Pope	Headlong Theatre	Steve Marmion	
The Mozart Question	2007 - 2009	Paolo Levi	Bristol Old Vic Theatre & New End Theatre, London	Julia MacShane	
The Maid's Tragedy	1997	Lysippus	Shakespeare's Globe Theatre	Lucy Bayley	
Democracy	2012 - 2013	Reinhard Wilke	Old Vic Theatre and Sheffield Crucible	Paul Miller	
War Horse	2010 & 2011	Greig; Schmidtt and Songman.	Royal National Theatre / New London Theatre	Marianne Elliott / Tom Morris / Alex Sims.	
Dangerous Corner	2015	Stanton	Watermill Theatre	Guy Retallack	
The Caucasian Chalk Circle	2015	Stage, Horseman / Jussap's Mother / Bandit.	Lyceum Theatre Edinburgh	Mark Thomson	
Hard Times	2000	Harthouse	Watermill Theatre	Guy Retallack	
An Inspector Calls	1998	Gerald	The Garrick Theatre - P.W. Productions	Stephen Daldry	
Twelfth Night	1996	Malvolio	Imaginary Forces	Michael Thomas	
Life of Galileo	2005 & 2007	The Bursar & Bellarmine	Birmingham Repertory Theatre	Jonathan Church	
The Winter's Tale	1997	Antigonus / 3rd Gentleman	Shakespeare's Globe Theatre	Mark Rylance	
Much Ado About Nothing	1993	Balthazar / Friar / Sextan	Thelma Holt Productions	Matthew Warchus	
Sherlock Holmes	1996	Dr. Watson	Sir Arthur Sullivans, Stage One Theatre Company	Tim Heath	
Cue Deadly: A Film, Live On Stage	2003	Jay / Melville	Hungry Bob Prods at Riverside Studios	Dan Hine and Kirsty Housley	
I Do	2014	David	Dante or Die	for Almeida Festival, Daphna Attias; also starring Anna Carteret.	
Love and Other Fairy Tales	2006	Chaucer	Scarlet Theatre Company	Grainne Byrne	
Love and Other Fairy Tales	2001	Chaucer	Scarlet Theatre Company	Katashina Dest	
Others	2000	Vershinin	Scarlet Theatre Company	Katashina Dest	
The Tempest	1991	Sebastian	The Globe Theatre, London and Phoebus Carte.	Mark Rylance	
Hamlet	1992	Rosencrantz	RSC Stratford / Barbican	Ron Daniels	
A Clockwork Orange	1991	Teacher Jack	RSC Stratford / Barbican	Ron Daniels	
Casement	1996	Robert Monteith	Moving Theatre / Riverside Studios	Corin Redgrave	
The Winter's Tale	1998	Antigonus	Shakespeare's Globe Theatre	David Freeman	
Julius Caesar	1997	Brutus	Maison Bertaux	Metin Marlow	
Measure for Measure	1998	Angelo	Maison Bertaux	Metin Marlow	

== Film ==
Key
†	Denotes films that have not yet been released

Title	Year	Role	Director	Notes	Ref.
The Theory of Everything	2014	Cockcroft Guest 5	James Marsh		
Kingsman: The Secret Service	2014	Kingsman Tailor	Matthew Vaughn		
Diagnosis	2017	Gary	Eva Riley		
The King's Man	2020	Kingsman Tailor	Matthew Vaughn		

== Television ==
Title	Year	Role	Notes	Ref.
The Windsors	2020	Francis Willis	Season 3, Episode 4 directed by Amanda Blue.	
Grandchester	2020	Douglas Munroe	Season 5, Episode 4 directed by Christiana Ebohon.	
Howards End	2017	Swanage Doctor	Season 1, Episode 4 directed by Hettie Macdonald.	
The Halcyon	2017	Doctor	Season 1, Episode 4 directed by Rob Evans.	
Penny Dreadful	2016	Ship Doctor	Season 3, Episode 1 titled: "The Day Tennyson Died" directed by Damon Thomas.	
Houdini & Doyle	2016	Dr. Perlow	Season 1, Episode 3 titled: "In Manus Dei" directed by Daniel O'Hara.	
The Frankenstein Chronicles	2015	Librarian	Season 1, Episode 2 directed by Benjamin Ross.	
Party Animals	2007	Marcus Walter	Season 1, Episode 2 directed by Brian Grant.	
Waking the Dead	2007	Optometrist	Season 6, Episode 9 directed by Andy Hay.	
The Family Man	2006	Journalist	directed by John Strickland.	
Holby City	2005	Mr. Blackburn	Season 7, Episode 42 directed by Alice Troughton.	
Hustle	2005	Oliver Price	Season 2, Episode 3 directed by Alrick Riley.	
Murphy's Law	2004	Dr. Phibes	Season 2, Episode 4 directed by Ed Fraiman.	
EastEnders	2004	George Wakefield	directed by John Greening.	
M.I.T.: Murder Investigation Team	2003	DCI Bill Parkes	Season 1, Episode 6 directed by Susan Tully.	
Casualty	2002	Mr. Carter	Season 17, Episode 23 directed by Gwennan Sage.	
The Bill	2002	Stan Cross	Season 18, Episode 48 directed by Jamie Payne.	
Soldier Soldier	1994	SIB Officer	Season 4, Episode 11 directed by Michael Brayshaw.	
Between the Lines	1994	Publican (as Andrew Bridgemont)	Season 3, Episode 3 directed by Richard Standeven.	

== Documentary ==
Title	Year	Role	Notes	Ref.
The Chrysalis Theatre Acting School	2009	Himself	Director by Álvaro Ramos.	
1001 Inventions and the Library of Secrets	2010	Abbas Ibn Firnas	Directed by Alan Deakins & produced by the British foundation 1001 Inventions aiming to promote the achievements of the Golden Age of Islam.	

== Video games ==
Title	Year	Role	Notes	Ref.
Star Wars: The Old Republic	2011	Additional Voices		

== Books ==
Bridgmont is directly cited or mentioned in the following works (non-exhautive list):

- Reading Shakespeare on Stage (1995) by Herbert R. Coursen. University of Delaware Press.
- Shakespeare Comes to Broadmoor: The Actors Are Come Hither: The Performance of Tragedy in a Secure Psychiatric Hospital (1992) by Murray Cox. Jessica Kingsley Publishers.
- The Europa Directory of Literary Awards and Prizes (2015) by Susan Leckey. Routledge.
- Staging Shakespeare at the New Globe (Early Modern Literature in History; 1999) by P. Kiernan. Palgrave Macmillan.
- Theatre at Stratford-upon-Avon: Volume 1 (1994) by Michael Mullin. Greenwood Press.
- American Theatre, Volume 18 (2001) by the Theatre Communications Group.
- Cahiers Élisabéthains (1989). Paul Valéry University Press.
- Plays and Players (1993). Hansom Books.
- London Theatre Record (1990) and the Theatre Record, Volume 21 (2001) by Ian Herbert. Theatre Record Limited.
