= Elise Lamb =

Australian actress, writer, dancer and director

- Born: Rebecca Elise Lamb; Brisbane, Queensland, Australia
- Education: Royal Central School of Speech and Drama (MA); London Academy of Music and Dramatic Art
- Occupations: Actress, dancer, stunt performer, writer, director, producer
- Years active: 2001 – present
- Awards: Brisbane International Film Festival – Best Brisbane Short Film; Ian Potter Cultural Trust

Rebecca Elise Lamb, known professionally as Elise Lamb, is an Australian actress, dancer, stunt performer, writer, director, and producer of theatre and film. Lamb is a graduate of the prestigious Royal Central School of Speech and Drama and is known for her extensive stage work including her portrayal of Zelda Fitzgerald in the Australian premiere of William Luce's play The Last Flapper. As a writer, she has been Long-Listed twice for the Australian Writers' Guild Monte Miller Award with her screenplays The Australian Girl and Rocking Out. As a writer/director her short film The Wilted Rose had its world premiere screening in competition at the Brisbane International Film Festival where it won Best Brisbane Short Film and was a 2024 contender for the Australian Academy of Cinema and Television Arts Award (AACTA) for Best Short Film.

== Early life and education ==
Lamb was born and raised in Brisbane, Australia. She studied classical ballet through the Royal Academy of Dance from the age of three and studied musical theatre at the Australian Dance Performance Institute. When Lamb was 15 years old she was chosen to dance for Australian vocal artist Vanessa Amorosi and girl group Bardot at the Opening Gala of the 2001 Goodwill Games. She graduated from Canterbury College in 2003 where she studied drama and music and performed in the school's production of Guys and Dolls.

Lamb studied acting in Los Angeles at the Lee Strasberg Theatre and Film Institute and at the Stella Adler Studio of Acting. She then trained as an actor at the National Institute of Dramatic Art (NIDA) in Sydney before going on to study Classical Acting at the London Academy of Music and Dramatic Art (LAMDA). In 2016, Lamb graduated from the Royal Central School of Speech and Drama with a Master's Degree in Advanced Theatre Practice.

== Career ==
=== Acting ===
Lamb began her professional career in 2003 at the age of 17 when she was employed as a cast member at Warner Bros. Movie World on the Gold Coast, Australia. There she spent her first 5 years out of high school portraying numerous roles including DC Comics hero Batgirl and supervillain Catwoman, The Justice League 's Hawkgirl, Shrek 's Princess Fiona, Scooby-Doo 's Daphne Blake and was a dancer in the Looney Tunes Musical Review. She was the youngest performer to present the Movie Magic Special Effects Show and was a member of its closing cast in 2005. She also performed in the Police Academy Stunt Show and was an original cast member of the Scooby-Doo Disco Detectives.

In 2006, she made her theatre debut playing Vibrata in Stephen Sondheim's A Funny Thing Happened on the Way to the Forum directed by Tony Alcock.

In 2007, Lamb danced with The Australian Ballet for their Brisbane season of Don Quixote at QPAC and performed in Rodgers and Hammerstein's Carousel at the Twelfth Night Theatre.

In 2008, Lamb relocated to Osaka, Japan for 2 years to work for Universal Studios Japan as an actor, dancer and stunt performer. There she reprised her role as Princess Fiona, impersonated Marilyn Monroe, originated the role of Cinderella in the Magical Starlight Parade (IAAPA Big E Award "Best Overall Production"), danced as a Rockette in the annual Christmas Parade and performed the roles of Wendy and Jane in the Thea (Themed Entertainment Association) Award-winning Peter Pan's Neverland. She was also a Show Captain and assisted with the choreography and character creation of Cinderella and Fairy Godmother in the Magical Starlight Parade.

After completing her training at NIDA in 2012, Lamb appeared in numerous independent Australian films including The Pale Moonlight opposite Matt Boesenberg and Blown for Tropfest which she also wrote, directed and produced. She also appeared as Juliet in the Romeo and Juliet live marketing campaign performances for the Queensland Theatre Company.

In 2014, she starred as Zelda Fitzgerald and produced the Australian premiere of William Luce's one-woman play The Last Flapper at Brisbane Arts Theatre. AussieTheatre praised her performance "The Last Flapper offers Lamb an opportunity to showcase her talents as actor, singer and dancer. She fitted the role of Zelda Fitzgerald well, as she sang and twirled about using every inch of the stage, her delivery superb".

In 2015, Lamb played Katherina in The Taming of the Shrew for Phoenix Ensemble and reprised her role as Zelda Fitzgerald in The Last Flapper for Brisbane Fringe Festival. In December 2015, she was awarded the Ian Potter Cultural Trust Award, a professional development grant for emerging Australian artists which allowed her to study at the Royal Central School of Speech and Drama.

After graduating from Central in 2016, Lamb secured small roles in The Crown and feature films Stan and Ollie and All the Money in the World. She was also featured in a Commercial for Cadbury with fellow Australian Jesinta Franklin. Lamb performed in new writing at Off West End theatres Arcola Theatre, Theatre N16, Pleasance Theatre, The Vaults, Leicester Square Theatre and Battersea Arts Centre. She played WWI Correspondent Louise Mack in her debut play The Australian Girl and Australian Suffragette Muriel Matters in her short play "Deeds, Not Words".

In 2022, she played Lee in Marvin's Room by Scott McPherson at Ad Astra Theatre Company. Reviewers described Lamb's performance as "a standout" and "a perfect casting choice".

=== Directing ===
Lamb directed her debut short film Blown for Tropfest in 2012.

Lamb was a trainee director at the Brisbane Arts Theatre from 2014 to 2015. She had her theatre directorial debut with their 2015 season opener The Complete Works of William Shakespeare (Abridged) and was the assistant director/co-director for their 1000th production Noises Off. In 2015, she also directed Elvis Is Dead by Canadian playwright James Hutchison for the Short & Sweet Theatre Festival at The Arts Centre Gold Coast. Lamb was a member of the Young Vic Directors Program (2016-2018) where she participated in Research & Development for Maria Aberg’s The Winter's Tale and Jeff James’ The Master Builder.

Lamb's 2019 Griffith Film School Thesis Film Method In Madness which she wrote, directed and produced, stars Ted Lasso's Cristo Fernández as Hamlet and was a Finalist in Kenneth Branagh's Shakespeare Shorts and Won "Best Director" and "Best Cinematography" at the Paris International Film Awards.

Her short film Skin & Blister was nominated for Best Queensland Film at the WIFT (Women in Film & Television) V-Fest and screened at the Melbourne Women in Film Festival. Lamb has also shot two short films a director/cinematographer, Op Shop which was nominated for Best Short Film at the Bendigo Queer Film Festival and screened at ShanghaiPRIDE Film Festival and A Message which opened for Event Horizon at Monster Fest.

In 2023, Lamb directed and was dramaturge for a new original stage play Bloom Girl which premiered at the Thomas Dixon Centre. The play was described as "Fleabag meets the digital world" with Lamb's direction being praised as masterful and iconic.

Lamb was made a Full Member of the Australian Directors Guild in 2023. She was endorsed by Queensland Chapter Head Mairi Cameron and the approval board included Daina Reid.

Lamb wrote, directed and produced The Wilted Rose, a social impact short film made in partnership with not-for-profit organisation The Centre For Women & Co. to raise awareness for domestic violence. The film had its world premiere screening in competition at the Brisbane International Film Festival where it won Best Brisbane Short Film and was a 2024 contender for the Australian Academy of Cinema and Television Arts Award (AACTA) for Best Short Film. The film was acquired by SBS Australia and premiered on SBS On Demand on November 1st, 2024.

In 2026, Lamb directed and produced The Art of Aging, a three part branded collaboration with Korean Skincare company Beauty of Joseon. She also featured in the short films as the Artist and painted watercolours of the skincare products.

=== Writing ===
In 2012, Lamb wrote her debut short film Blown for Tropfest and See You Soon.

Whilst a student at the Royal Central School of Speech and Drama, Lamb began writing her debut play The Australian Girl, inspired by the life of Louise Mack, the first female war correspondent during World War I. Central funded research and development in Belgium for the play and the first draft was presented in a semi-staged reading at LOST Theatre in London during the summer of 2016. In 2017, The Australian Girl received further support from the Old Vic New Voices and a full length version of the play premiered Off West End at Theatre N16 as part of their Military Season Aftershock. Her short play A Dance Of Two Sisters about two sisters during World War II was presented at the Pleasance Theatre. In 2018, her second short play Deeds, Not Words about Australian Suffragette Muriel Matters was also presented at the Pleasance Theatre to mark the 100th Anniversary of the Vote for Women. Lamb was a member of the National Theatre's Writers Group (2018) and was an Associate Artist of Theatre 1880 (2016-2018).

In 2020, Lamb began adapting her stage play The Australian Girl for screen. The short Proof of Concept script was nominated for the Australian Writers' Guild Monte Miller Award, won "Best Short Screenplay" and the "Grand Jury Prize" at the Female Voices Rock Film Festival in New York, was runner-up "Best Unproduced Short Screenplay" at the Oscar-qualifying Raindance Film Festival and was also a semi-finalist at the Austin Film Festival. In 2022, she was awarded the inaugural Raindance Screenwriting Fellowship to develop the script into a long-form project.

Lamb received her second Australian Writers' Guild Monte Miller Award nomination in 2023 with her pilot script for her semi-biographical TV Series Rocking Out. The script was also long-listed for the Stan. and Screen Queensland Premium Drama Development Fund.

== Personal life ==
There was already a Rebecca Lamb registered with Spotlight and Equity, as a result Lamb changed her name professionally to "Elise Lamb". She was previously credited as "Rebecca Elise Lamb".

Although born in Australia, Lamb has Scottish, Irish, English and French ancestry.

Lamb holds the UK Global Talent Visa, endorsed by Nicholas Hytner and resides in London.

== Filmography ==
=== Director, writer and producer credits ===
==== Film ====
Year	Title	Director	Writer	Producer	Notes
2012	Blown	Yes	Yes	Yes	Tropfest Short Film
2012	See You Soon	No	Yes	Yes	Short Film
2019	Caged	Yes	Yes	Yes	Short Film; Also editor
2019	Method in Madness	Yes	Yes	Yes	Short Film; Also editor
2019	Skin & Blister	Yes	Yes	Yes	Short Film
2019	Op Shop	Yes	Yes	Yes	Short Film; Also cinematographer and editor
2020	A Message	Yes	No	Yes	Short Film; Also cinematographer Premiered at Monster Fest
2023	The Wilted Rose	Yes	Yes	Yes	Short Film; World Premiere in competition at Brisbane International Film Festival; Won – Best Brisbane Short Film
	The Australian Girl	Yes	Yes	Yes	Nominated – Australian Writers' Guild Monte Miller Award; In Development

==== Television ====
Year	Title	Director	Writer	Producer	Notes
2025	Slow Horses	Shadow Director	No	No	Season 6 Mentored by Adam Randall and Eben Bolter
	Rocking Out	Yes	Yes	Yes	Nominated – Australian Writers' Guild Monte Miller Award; In Development

==== Commercial ====
Year	Title	Director	Writer	Producer	Notes
2026	Beauty of Joseon X Elise Lamb: The Art of Aging	Yes	Yes	Yes	Short Film; Branded Content; Also cinematographer and editor
2026	Beauty of Joseon X Elise Lamb: The Art of Aging Part II	Yes	Yes	Yes	Short Film; Branded Content; Also cinematographer and editor
2026	Beauty of Joseon X Elise Lamb: The Art of Aging Part III	Yes	Yes	Yes	Short Film; Branded Content; Also cinematographer and editor

=== Assistant director credits ===
==== Film ====
Year	Title	1st Assistant Director	3rd Assistant Director	Assistant Director / PA	Notes
2017	National Theatre Live: Rosencrantz and Guildenstern Are Dead	No	No	Yes	Broadcast from The Old Vic
2017	National Theatre Live: Young Marx	No	No	Yes	Broadcast from Bridge Theatre
2018	National Theatre Live: Julius Caesar	No	No	Yes	Broadcast from Bridge Theatre
2018	National Theatre Live: Allelujah!	No	No	Yes	Broadcast from Bridge Theatre
2021	I Can Be French	Yes	No	No	Short Film
2021	Falling in Slow Motion	Yes	No	No	Short Film
2021	Christmas on the Farm	No	Yes	No	
2022	Elvis	No	No	Yes	
2023	The Portable Door	No	No	Yes	
2024	Bookworm	No	Yes	No	
2024	Eden	No	Yes	No	
2025	The Fantastic Four: First Steps	No	No	Yes	
2025	The Family Plan 2	No	No	Yes	
2026	Jack Ryan: Ghost War	No	No	Yes	
2026	Digger	No	No	Yes	
2026	Wife & Dog	No	No	Yes	
2026	Dune: Part Three	No	No	Yes	
2027	Jason Statham Stole My Bike	No	Yes	No	

==== Television ====
Year	Title	2nd Assistant Director	3rd Assistant Director	Assistant Director / PA	Notes
2022	Joe vs. Carole	No	No	Yes	
2022	The Wilds	No	No	Yes	Also Stand In for Rachel Griffiths
2022	Young Rock	No	No	Yes	
2022	Black Snow	No	Yes	No	
2024	Nautilus	Yes	No	Yes	
2026	House of the Dragon	No	No	Yes	
2026	The Lord of the Rings: The Rings of Power	No	No	Yes	
2026	Harry Potter	No	No	Yes	
2026	Kennedy	No	No	Yes	

==== Commercial ====
Year	Title	1st Assistant Director	3rd Assistant Director	Assistant Director / PA	Notes
2019	Griffith University: School of Dentistry	Yes	No	No	
2022	MeOhMy: A Real Showstopper	Yes	No	No	
2022	ABC 90th Anniversary	No	Yes	No	

=== Acting credits ===
==== Film ====
Year	Title	Role	Notes
2010	While He Was Waiting	Betty	
2011	Game Over	Gang Boss	Also Stunt Performer
2012	Blown	The Girlfriend	Tropfest Short Film; Also director, writer and producer
2012	See You Soon	The Girl	Short Film; Also writer and producer
2013	One June Afternoon	Chloe	
2013	House of Cards	Talia	Also Stunt Performer
2014	The Pale Moonlight	Howard's Wife	Short Film; Premiered at Fantasia International Film Festival
2017	All the Money in the World	Hotel Maid	Directed by Ridley Scott
2018	Stan and Ollie	Plymouth Girl	Directed by Jon S. Baird
2019	Method in Madness	The Stage Manager	Short Film; Also director, writer and producer
2019	Skin & Blister	Victoria	Short Film; Also director, writer and producer
2021	Seriously Red	Tamworth Festival Girl	Directed by Gracie Otto
2026	Spider-Man: Brand New Day	The Inhabited	Stunts: Special Action Performer / Dancer; Directed by Destin Daniel Cretton

==== Television ====
Year	Title	Role	Notes
2001	Opening Ceremony of the 2001 Goodwill Games	Dancer	Live performance at Brisbane Entertainment Centre
2006	Lord Mayor's Christmas Carols	Dancer	Live performance at Brisbane's Riverstage
2017	The Crown	White House Guest	Series 2, Episode 8 Directed by Stephen Daldry
2021	Young Rock	Market Goer	Series 1, Episode 2 Directed by Daina Reid

==== Commercial ====
Year	Title	Role	Notes
2007	Experience Brisbane	Dancer	
2007	Warner Bros. Movie World: The Justice League	Hawkgirl	
2008	Universal Studios Japan: The Gift of Angels	Angel / Dancer	
2017	Cadbury – Dark Milk: The Joyful Debate	Cinema Woman	Premiered during Masterchef Australia
2026	Beauty of Joseon X Elise Lamb: The Art of Aging	Artist	Branded Content Collaboration; Also director and producer
2026	Beauty of Joseon X Elise Lamb: The Art of Aging Part II	Artist	Branded Content Collaboration; Also director and producer
2026	Beauty of Joseon X Elise Lamb: The Art of Aging Part III	Artist	Branded Content Collaboration; Also director and producer

==== Music video ====
Year	Title	Artist	Role	Notes
2011	Anything Worth Anything	StoneMason	Madeleine	Triple J Unearthed

== Theatre ==
=== Acting credits ===
==== Stage ====
Year	Production	Role	Venue	Notes
2006	A Funny Thing Happened on the Way to the Forum	Vibrata	Spotlight Theatre	Directed by Tony Alcock
2006	Gypsy	Hollywood Blonde	Spotlight Theatre	
2007	Don Quixote	Grand Lady	Lyric Theatre QPAC	Presented by The Australian Ballet; Directed by David McAllister
2007	Carousel	Ballet Soloist / Ensemble	Twelfth Night Theatre	Directed by Tony Alcock
2011	Chicago	Velma Kelly	Brisbane Convention and Exhibition Centre	Directed by Anthony Lee
2012	Romeo and Juliet	Juliet	New Farm Park	Presented by Queensland Theatre Company; Directed by Todd MacDonald
2013	The Winter's Tale	Emilia	LAMDA	Directed by Jonathan Humphreys
2014	Mixed Doubles	Various	Brisbane Arts Theatre	
2014	The Last Flapper	Zelda Fitzgerald	Brisbane Arts Theatre	Also producer One-woman show Australian premiere
2014	Merry Fecking Christmas	Fiona	The Arts Centre Gold Coast	Presented by Underground Productions; Short & Sweet Theatre Festival
2015	The Taming of the Shrew	Katherina	Pavilion Theatre	Presented by Phoenix Ensemble
2015	The Last Flapper	Zelda Fitzgerald	Reload Espresso Bar	Also producer Brisbane Fringe Festival
2016	Edward II	Gaveston	Royal Central School of Speech and Drama	Directed by Joe Hill-Gibbins
2016	Handle With Care	Zoe	Royal Central School of Speech and Drama	Work in Progress performance in collaboration with Dante or Die Theatre
2016	Strictly Come Barking	Tracey	Hen and Chickens Theatre	
2016	The Australian Girl	Louise Mack	LOST Theatre	Also writer and director Semi-staged reading
2017	Keep Them Close	The Sexy Cat	Battersea Arts Centre	Also producer Presented by Theatre 1880
2017	Fathers and Daughters	Lara	Leicester Square Theatre	
2017	Fixed Action Pattern	Kayla	The Vaults Theatre	Presented by Theatre 1880; Written by Francis Grin
2017	A Dance Of Two Sisters	Evelyn	Pleasance Theatre	Also writer and director Off West End premiere
2017	The Australian Girl	Louise Mack	Theatre N16	Also writer and producer Off West End premiere
2018	Listen	The Woman	Arcola Theatre	
2018	Deeds, Not Words	Muriel Matters	Pleasance Theatre	Also writer Off West End premiere
2018	Lost in Bank	Meghan	Greenwich Theatre	Also writer Off West End premiere
2019	Deeds, Not Words	Muriel Matters	Brisbane Powerhouse	Also writer Short & Sweet Theatre Festival; Australian premiere
2021	Deeds, Not Words	Muriel Matters	Brisbane Arts Theatre	Also writer and director
2022	Marvin's Room	Lee	Ad Astra Theatre Company	

==== Theme Park ====
Year	Production	Role	Venue	Notes
2003–2005	Movie Magic Special Effects Show	Presenter / Performer	Warner Bros. Movie World	Member of closing cast
2003–2008	DC Superheroes & Villains	Batgirl / Catwoman	Warner Bros. Movie World	
2003–2008	The Justice League	Hawkgirl	Warner Bros. Movie World	
2003–2008	Scooby Doo Disco Detectives	Daphne Blake	Warner Bros. Movie World	Also Scooby Doo dance/stunt double for pre-filmed show footage Member of opening cast
2003–2008	The Looney Tunes Musical Review	Dancer	Warner Bros. Movie World	
2003–2008	The Matrix	Trinity	Warner Bros. Movie World	
2003–2008	Police Academy Stunt Show	Wife / Placed Guest	Warner Bros. Movie World	
2003–2008	Main Street Atmosphere Character	Princess Fiona	Warner Bros. Movie World	
2008	Summer Splash Parade	Dancer	Universal Studios Japan	
2008	Happy Harmony Celebration	Princess Fiona	Universal Studios Japan	
2008–2010	Peter Pan's Neverland	Wendy / Jane / Show Captain	Universal Studios Japan	Won – Thea Award "Event Spectacular"
2008–2010	Main Street Atmosphere Character	Marilyn Monroe / Show Captain	Universal Studios Japan	
2009–2010	Magical Starlight Parade	Cinderella / Show Captain	Universal Studios Japan	Won – IAAPA Big E Award "Best Overall Production"; Member of opening cast
2009–2010	Happy Snow Party	Rockette / Show Captain	Universal Studios Japan	

=== Director credits ===
Year	Title	Venue / Company	Notes
2015	The Complete Works of William Shakespeare (Abridged)	Brisbane Arts Theatre	Written by Reduced Shakespeare Company
2015	Elvis Is Dead	The Arts Centre Gold Coast	Written by James Hutchison; Short+Sweet Theatre Festival
2015	Noises Off	Brisbane Arts Theatre	Written by Michael Frayn; Brisbane Arts Theatre's 1000th Production; Assistant Director/Co-director
2016	The Australian Girl	LOST Theatre	Semi-staged reading
2017	A Dance of Two Sisters	Pleasance Theatre	
2017	The Winters Tale	Young Vic	Directors Program Placement; Directed by Maria Aberg
2017	The Master Builder	Young Vic	Directors Program Placement; Directed by Jeff James
2021	Deeds, Not Words	Brisbane Arts Theatre	
2023	Bloom Girl	Thomas Dixon Centre	Also Dramaturge; Written by Charli Burrowes

=== Writer credits ===
Year	Title	Notes
2017	A Dance of Two Sisters	Short Play
2017	The Australian Girl	Full Length Play
2018	Deeds, Not Words	Short Play
2018	Lost in Bank	Short Play
	All The Light Is Gone	Full Length Play; In Development

=== Producer credits ===
Year	Title	Venue / Production Company	Notes
2014	The Last Flapper	Brisbane Arts Theatre	Australian Premiere; Written by William Luce
2015	The Last Flapper	Reload Espresso Bar	Brisbane Fringe Festival
2017	Keep Them Close	Battersea Arts Centre / Theatre 1880	Written by Mathias Swann
2017	A Dance of Two Sisters	Pleasance Theatre	Off West End premiere
2017	The Australian Girl	Theatre N16	Off West End premiere
2018	Deeds, Not Words	Pleasance Theatre	Off West End premiere
2018	Lost in Bank	Greenwich Theatre	Off West End premiere
2019	Deeds, Not Words	Brisbane Powerhouse	Australian premiere
2021	Deeds, Not Words	Brisbane Arts Theatre	

== Awards and nominations ==
Year	Award	Category	Nominated work	Result
2024	Australian Academy of Cinema and Television Arts Award (AACTA)	Best Short Film	The Wilted Rose	Contender
2023	Brisbane International Film Festival	Best Brisbane Short Film	The Wilted Rose	Won
2023	Australian Writers' Guild	Monte Miller Award (Long-Listed)	Rocking Out	Nominated
2022	Austin Film Festival	Script Competition - Short Screenplay (Semi-Finalist)	The Australian Girl	Nominated
2022	Australian Writers' Guild	Monte Miller Award (Long-Listed)	The Australian Girl	Nominated
2021	Female Voices Rock Film Festival (NYC)	Grand Jury Prize	The Australian Girl	Won
2021	Female Voices Rock Film Festival (NYC)	Best Short Screenplay	The Australian Girl	Won
2021	Raindance Film Festival Script Competition	Best Unproduced Short Screenplay	The Australian Girl	Runner-up
2021	Paris International Film Awards	Best Director	Method In Madness	Won
2021	Nashville Film Festival Screenwriting Competition	Best Short Screenplay (Quarter-Finalist)	The Australian Girl	Nominated
2021	Los Angeles International Screenplay Awards	Best Short Screenplay (Semi-Finalist)	The Wilted Rose	Nominated
2021	Los Angeles International Screenplay Awards	Best Short Screenplay (Quarter-Finalist)	The Australian Girl	Nominated
2021	WIFT (Women in Film & Television) V-Fest	Best Queensland Film (Final 3)	Skin & Blister	Nominated
2020	Shakespeare Shorts	Best Film Inspired by Shakespeare (Final 13)	Method In Madness	Nominated
2020	Hollyshorts Screenwriting Competition	Best Female Short Screenplay (Semi-Finalist)	Don't Make Her Angry	Nominated
2020	Bendigo Queer Film Festival	International Short Film Competition (Final 12)	Op Shop	Nominated
2016	Ian Potter Cultural Trust Award	Performing Arts	Acting / Writing / Directing	Won
