= Peter Bridgmont =

English actor (1929–2019)

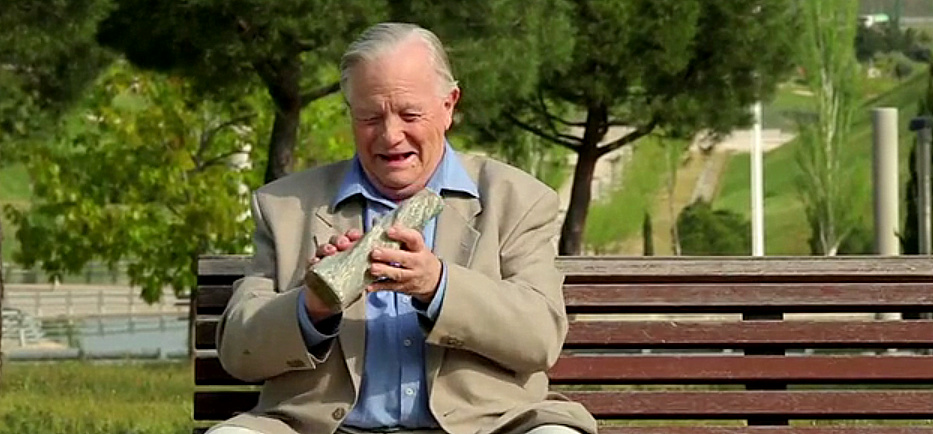
- Bridgmont on the set of Álvaro Ramos' "The Magic Box" (2011)
- Born: 23 January 1929
- Died: 24 June 2019 (aged 90)
- Education: Wynstones School; Guildhall School of Music & Drama
- Occupation: Actor
- Years active: 1950–2019
- Spouse: Barbara Brown (Bridgmont)
- Children: Richard, Andrew, Nicolas

Peter Bridgmont (23 January 1929 – 24 June 2019) was an English actor, acting teacher and author who had an extensive career on stage, film, and television spanning over 60 years. Bridgmont, who is a Guildhall School of Music and Drama graduate, was mostly known as one of the former members of the Theatre Workshop and one of the original cast members of the very first West End production of Agatha Christie's The Mousetrap opening in 1952 at the Ambassadors Theatre which went on to become the world's longest running stage production. Peter notably spoke a number of parts in The Great War (1964) narrated by Michael Redgrave and appeared in the British television drama series Z-Cars (1962–1978) directed by Christopher Morahan (CBE, 1929–2017). He founded the Chrysalis Theatre Acting School in London in 1975 and taught 'speech in drama' and 'gesture' at the Shakespeare's Globe.

== Early life ==
Bridgmont grew up among actors, singers, dancers and clowns. His father Leslie Bridgmont was a pianist for the silent movies, his mother was a cellist. Peter's Father worked for the BBC where he produced 'Much Binding in the Marsh' four episodes of The Goon Show and many other programmes. Bridgmont used to attend his parents' pantomimes as a child including one during which English musical theatre and operettas actress Jean Colin (28 years old at the time; 24 March 1905 – 7 March 1989) ironically promised him that she would marry him. He was educated at the Wynstones School, a Steiner Waldorf school in Gloucestershire, in the Cotswolds. Peter attended the Guildhall School of Music & Drama in London.

== Career ==
Bridgmont was a member of the cast, alongside Baron Richard Attenborough (CBE, 1923– 2014) in the first West End production of Agatha Christie's The Mousetrap opening in 1952 at the Ambassadors Theatre, which went on to become the world's longest running stage production. Bridgmont met his wife Barbara Brown (Bridgmont) while they were both company members at the Theatre Workshop whose long-serving director was Royal Academy of Dramatic Arts graduate Joan Littlewood (1914–2002) and fellow members included Richard Harris (1930–2002), Nigel Hawthorne (CBE; 1929–2001), George Sewell (1924–2007), David Scase (1919–2003), Victor Spinetti (1929–2012), John Thaw (CBE, 1942–2002), Barbara Windsor (DBE, 1937–2020), Yootha Joyce (1927–1980), Sheila Hancock (CBE,1933–), Dudley Foster (1924–1973), Marjie Lawrence (1932–2010), Stephen Lewis (1926–2015), Ewan MacColl (1915–1989), Murray Melvin (1932–), Frank Norman (1930–1980), John Junkin (1930–2006), Roy Kinnear (1934–1988), Diana Coupland (1928–2006), Shelagh Delaney (1938–2011), Glynn Edwards (1931–2018) and Howard Goorney (1921–2007). Many Theatre Workshop productions were transferred to theatres in the West End and some such as Oh, What a Lovely War! and A Taste of Honey, were made into films. Peter was introduced to and worked with one of the pioneers of modern dance in Europe, Rudolf von Laban (Hungarian: Rezső Lábán de Váraljas; 1879–1958) through his Laban Movement Analysis, Labanotation (Kinetography) and Laban Movement Study. Peter and Barbara formed their own Mime Company and were in contact with modernist theatre practitioner, director and scenic designer Edward Gordon Craig (CH OBE 1872–1966), the son of actress Dame Ellen Terry (GBE, 1847–1928).

== The Boundary Theatre Group ==
Peter and Barbara initially modelled their new company on the Theatre Workshop of Joan Littlewood in October 1961 The eight actors in the group were Peter Bridgmont, Barbara Rowen (Bridgmont), Margaret Freeman, Paul Piercy, Carol Robby, Gillian Cater, David Scobie and Beryl Swinscoe. For their first production they chose three one act plays: The Flageolet by Maurice Sands, Ruzzante Returns by Angelo Beolco and The Interior by Maurice Maeterlink. The performances took place in a converted Spiritualist building which the group converted with 50 salvaged seats from the old Haymarket cinema. The Group performed many live improvised shows as well as plays in their own theatre in South London and around England at Festivals and colleges. Their repertoire included Antigone by Sophocles. Now called The Boundary Theatre Company, Antigone was performed at the London Academy of Music and Dramatic Art LAMDA Theatre in 1966. The cast included Barbara Rowen as Antigone, Peter Bridgmont as Creon, Gillian Cater as Ismene and Paul Piercy as Haemon and the Guard, the set designer was Tony Leah.

== Chrysalis Theatre Acting School ==
The couple studied the formation of the art of dramatic speech and gesture created by Austrian philosopher, social reformer, architect and esotericist Rudolf Steiner (1861–1925). They started the Boundaries Theatre Company which became their own drama school in 1975, the Chrysalis Theatre Acting School in the same London building they had bought in Balham. The theatre' venue had been used by the Spiritualist Association of Great Britain until then. The students who came from all over the world such as Japan or certain African countries included Spanish actress Luz Altamira or Sir Mark Rylance. The school lasted for thirty years. In the 1990s both of them gave training in voice and gesture to the professional company of the Shakespeare's Globe. Peter also gave courses in both the United States and throughout Europe during the same period.

== La Crisálida ==
Bridgmont supported the La Crisálida Studio, the first school focused on the 'Art of Speech' in Spain, founded by his pupils speech artist Luz Altamira and Goya Awards-nominated thespian Álvaro Ramos as well as actress and author Pilar Altamira member of the 'Anthroposophical Society of Spain'. This place also hosted seminars and conferences that Peter Bridgmont regularly offered between 1997 and 2003.

== Non-exhaustive bibliography ==
- The Spear Thrower (javelin thrower), a Textbook of Ideas and Exercises for the Actor (1983) by Peter Bridgmont (ASIN: B000O8RJIY)
- The Liberation of The Actor (1992) by Peter Bridgmont (ISBN 978-0904693331).

== Quotes ==
- English actor, theatre director and playwright Sir David Mark Rylance Waters (born 18 January 1960) who long collaborated with Bridgmont declared:

"Peter and Barbara Bridgmont made a profound difference to my persona as an actor with their teaching about voice and speech. I use the word 'persona' carefully, as they taught me how to move with sound, through sound, persona. In our visual-material age, sound is the great undiscovered or forgotten land for actors and audiences. Reason and Emotion are all very well in speech, much needed, but with Peter and Barbara I learnt of the limbs of speech, the feet, the legs, the arms, the great will and beautiful spirit to move with speech. Just as a marvellous javelin thrower wills his spear down the pitch to the winning distance and harnesses every muscle necessary in perfect balance to achieve his aim, so, when appropriate, we speak in space and silence. It was a lucky day for me when I met them; they know some great secrets and forgotten pathways."

- "Readers who are interested in the Art of Drama may also wish to refer to The Liberation of The Actor (1992) by Peter Bridgmont"

== British Film Institute Archives ==
A répertoire of Bridgmont's voice work for the year 1966 is available at the British Film Institute archives as follows:

- 1966: The Sword Must Be Kept Sharp also featuring Michael Redgrave.
- 1966: What Did Greece Matter? also featuring Michael Redgrave and Felix Felton.
- 1966: It Will Proceed to the End also featuring Michael Redgrave and Felix Felton.
- 1966: One Perplexity after Another also featuring Michael Redgrave and Felix Felton.
- 1966: We Are on the Edge of a Precipice also featuring Michael Redgrave and Anton Diffring.
- 1966: Not a Penny off the Pay also featuring Michael Redgrave and David Bauer.
- 1966: It Has Advanced the Footlights also featuring Michael Redgrave and Anton Diffring.
- 1966: Your Death Knell Has Sounded also featuring Michael Redgrave and Anton Diffring.
- 1966: War Is Re-enthroned also featuring Michael Redgrave and Anton Diffring.
- 1966: We Neither Govern Not Misgovern also featuring Michael Redgrave and David Bauer.
- 1966: The Popular Masses Are Dull also featuring Michael Redgrave and Anton Diffring.
- 1966: Germany Is Reawakening also featuring Michael Redgrave and Anton Diffring.
- 1966: There Lies a Sleeping Giant also featuring Michael Redgrave and Anton Diffring.
- 1966: Who Can Conquer the Street... also featuring Michael Redgrave and Felix Felton.
- 1966: On the Idle Hill of Summer also featuring Michael Redgrave and Felix Felton.
- 1966: Make Room for Peace also featuring Michael Redgrave and Felix Felton.
- 1966: There Is a Great Tide Turning also featuring Michael Redgrave and Anton Diffring.
- 1966: This Is Such a Time also featuring Michael Redgrave and David Bauer.
- 1966: Boys You Have Been Betrayed also featuring Michael Redgrave and Felix Felton.
- 1966: Now I Can Die also featuring Michael Redgrave and David Bauer.
- 1966: Long Live the War also featuring Michael Redgrave and Felix Felton.
- 1966: What Hand Would Not Wither also featuring Michael Redgrave, Robert Ayres and David Bauer.

== Honours ==
- The documentary on Peter and Barbara directed by Spanish actor and director Álvaro Ramos which was eponymously titled The Chrysalis (2009) won the Best Documentary award at the High Desert International Film Festival in Nevada, United States.

== Personal life ==
Peter had three sons with Barbara: Richard, Nicolas and Andrew Bridgmont who is also an accomplished actor himself who notably starred in Matthew Vaughn's Kingsman: The Secret Service (2014), James Marsh's The Theory of Everything (2014) or Penny Dreadful (2014–2016).
