= Margaret Bennell =

British educator, adult educator and Anthroposophist

Margaret Bennell (24 December 1893 in London – 23 July 1966 in Curry Mallet, Somerset) was a Steiner school teacher, co-founder of Wynstones School in Gloucestershire and founder of Hawkwood College in Stroud.

== Biography ==
Bennell entered the boarding school for girls at Crouch End, London at an early age, for her mother died when she was still a child. The headmistress of the school, Charlotte Cowdroy, a well-known reformer of education for girls, became a substitute for her mother. She studied English Literature in London, obtained her B.A. and began to teach at Charlotte Cowdroy's school, which in time, she took over. With a heart for social engagement, she taught young factory workers in London's East End besides her work at the school.

She encountered Waldorf education, most probably through her friend Margaret McMillan, attending the later conferences following the founding of the “New School” in Streatham, London in January 1925, that was to become Michael Hall. In the middle of a Eurythmy lesson, Margaret left the room together with her colleague Cora Nokes. “Cora, we’ve got to found a school!” - “Have we really?” “Yes. Indeed!”

== Wynstones ==
They set about putting the plan into action and in 1935 began looking for colleagues and for a suitable location. They managed to find a large manor house in Brookthorpe, Gloucestershire to begin with. Some pupils from Crouch End decided to go along with their two teachers and soon after the founding in 1937 a number more followed. Bettina Mellinger of the original Waldorf School in Stuttgart, which had just been closed by the Nazi government, joined them for a year as consultant. Norbert and Maria Glas, both doctors, also joined the College of Teachers and they were regularly visited by Walter Johannes Stein and Violetta Plincke. Lily Kolisko moved into the region as well after the death of her husband Eugen Kolisko in November 1939. Amongst a number of other committed pioneers, Rudi Lissau took over the Greek and Latin classes and was later to build up the high school. As the bomb attacks during the war mounted, student numbers rose rapidly in their secluded rural setting, amongst them many immigrant children who had fled Germany.

== Hawkwood College ==
As a result of her increasing deafness, teaching children became difficult, leading her to step out of the school and join a friend, Lily Whincop, who owned an old Manor, Hawkwood House in nearby Stroud. Here they founded Hawkwood College as a kind of youth training centre. Maria Röschl and Ernst Lehrs joined their collegial work from time to time and the college became a venue for summer courses in languages for students and teachers. It went through many transformations but remains a centre of anthroposophical work in England.

Margaret Bennell was described as tall, of distinguished appearance with an athletic figure. In her younger years she had represented her country in fencing tournaments, later instructing keen pupils in the art. Both her voice and exceptional command of the English language were a delight to listen to and she was highly respected by both students and colleagues. Yet if the need arose, she might be found on her knees scrubbing the kitchen floor.

Her cooperation with Isabel Wyatt led to the publication of her two books, one of which appeared posthumously. She was already very ill by this time and had retired to Curry Mallet in Somerset. Here she composed music to Shakespeare's lines:

Fear no more the heat o' the sun,
Nor the furious winter's rages;
Thou thy worldly task hast done,
Home art gone, and ta'en thy wages:
Golden lads and girls all must,
As chimney-sweepers, come to dust.

It was the sung as a requiem at her funeral after she died on 23 July 1966 at her home in Curry Mallet.

== Books ==
- An Introductory Commentary by Margaret Bennell and Isabel Wyatt on The Chymical Wedding of Christian Rosenkreutz, anno 1459 Michael Press (1965) ASIN B0007K2AU6
- Shakespeare’s Flowering of the Spirit The Lanthorn Press (1971) ASIN B001F9XM5U
