= Oh What a Lovely War =

Oh What a Lovely War may refer to:

- Oh, What a Lovely War!, a stage musical created in 1963 by Joan Littlewood and her Theatre Workshop
- Oh! What a Lovely War, a cinematic adaptation from 1969 of the stage musical, directed by Richard Attenborough
