= The Hostage (play) =

1958 play by Brendan Behan

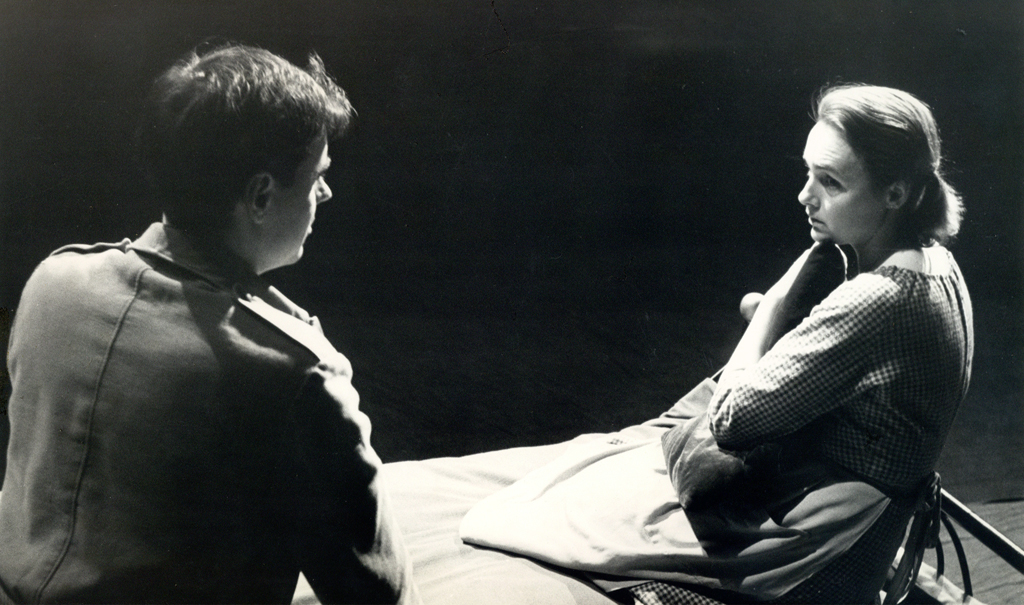
Danilo Benedičič as Leslie and Majda Potokar as Teresa in a 1963 performance by Ljubljana Slovene National Theatre Drama

The Hostage is a 1958 English-language play, with songs, by Irish playwright Brendan Behan. It consists of a much longer text, with songs, expanded from a one-act Irish language play An Giall also by Behan.

== Plot ==
The Hostage depicts the events leading up to the planned execution of an 18-year-old IRA member in a Belfast jail, accused of killing a Royal Ulster Constabulary policeman. Like the protagonist of The Quare Fellow, the audience never sees him. The action of the play is set in a very odd house of ill-repute on Nelson Street, Dublin, owned by a former IRA commandant. The hostage of the title is Leslie Williams, a young and innocent Cockney British Army soldier taken hostage at the border with Northern Ireland and held in the brothel, brought among the vibrant but desperately unorthodox combination of prostitutes, revolutionaries and general low characters inhabiting the place.

During the course of the play, a love story develops between Leslie and Teresa, a young girl, resident of the house. Both are orphans living foreign to the city they find themselves in, Teresa being from Ballymahon, County Longford. During this Teresa promises never to forget him.

The play ends with news of the hanging in Belfast and armed Gardaí raid the brothel. Leslie is killed in the ensuing gunfight, by Garda bullets. In the finale his corpse rises and sings "The Bells of Hell Go Ting-a-ling-a-ling".

== Structure ==
The play has a large cast of over 13 characters with the Irish characters representing different facets of Irish nationalism. In their comic representations, they express Behan's dislike for different aspects of Nationalist, Catholic, Republican Ireland's vision of itself by the late 1950s.

The play switches suddenly between comedy, serious political commentary and tragedy throughout its two hours. This constant change of tone is heightened further by its regular changes from prose to song, with a number of popular nationalist ballads punctuating the narrative, when sung by different cast members. In this it mirrors the music hall tradition of Dublin both pre- and post-independence and anticipates the later (1960s) British satire on the First World War, the play Oh, What a Lovely War!, created by Joan Littlewood's Theatre Workshop in 1963.

== Characters ==
MEN:

Pat, the caretaker of a lodging-house

Monsewer, the owner of the house

Rio Rita, a homosexual navvy

Princess Grace, his coloured boy-friend

Mr. Mulleady, a decaying Civil Servant

Leslie Williams, a British Soldier

IRA Officer, a fanatical patriot

Volunteer, Feargus O'Connor, a ticket-collector

Russian Sailor

WOMEN:

Meg Dillon, Pat's consort

Miss Gilchrist, a social worker

Colette, a whore

Ropeen, an old whore

Teresa, the skivvy, a country girl

Kate, the pianist

== Themes ==
The principal themes of the play are innocence set against the political motives and ambitions of others; and the arbitrary power of authority. It examines the Anglo-Irish relationship, and the Irish themselves. Behan uses Brechtian techniques of directly addressing the audience, using song and dance to offset the tragedy of the situation.

== Performance ==
An Giall was first performed at the Damer Theatre, Dublin, in June 1958. It was translated into English, by Behan, and had its London première at Joan Littlewood's Theatre Workshop at the Theatre Royal Stratford East in October of the same year. It subsequently transferred to the West End theatre and Broadway. Theatre Workshop used improvisational theatre to develop performance, and the text was revised during production, in a collaboration between Behan, Littlewood and the cast. The play was the West End début of actor Stephen Lewis.

The Hostage was also played at the Four Courts, Dublin, and at The Embankment, Tallaght, Co. Dublin in 1969 directed by Don Foley and Eamon Draper. The role of Teresa was played by Marie Rafferty and Leslie was played by Jerry Woods. During the Embankment performances, the cast met Brendan Behan's mother and pictures were taken, one of which was printed in a Dublin newspaper. A review was also published in the Dublin press.

== Script ==
The Hostage, by Brendan Behan (1970) Methuen Drama ISBN 0-413-31190-2
