= Hawkwood College =

College in Gloucestershire, England

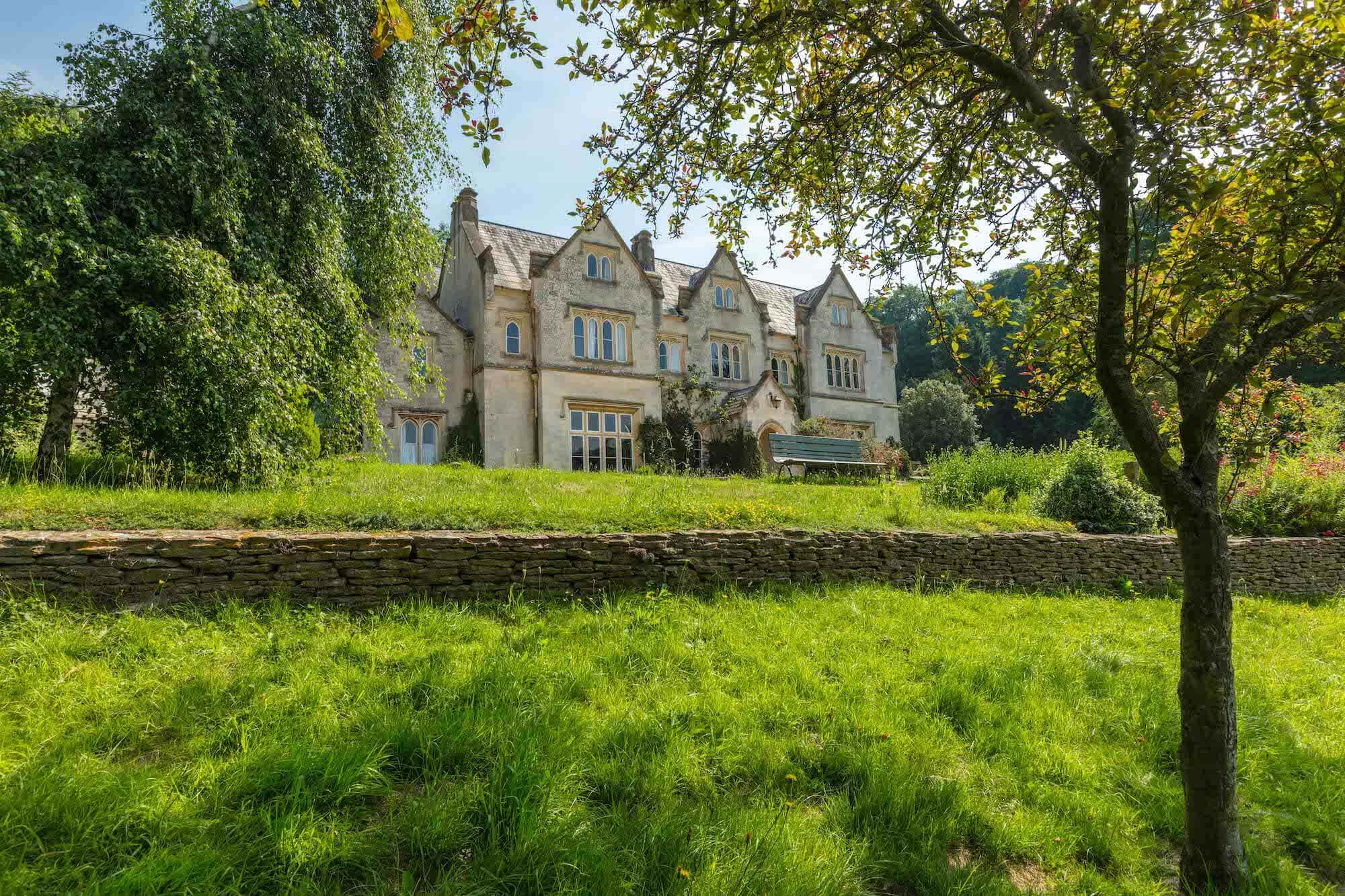
- Hawkwood Centre for Future Thinking

- Location in Gloucestershire
- 51°45′26.14″N 02°12′33.05″W
- Location: Gloucestershire, England

Listed Building – Grade II
- Official name: Hawkwood College
- Designated: 25 June 1974
- Reference no.: 1222649

Hawkwood Centre for Future Thinking is a registered charity and independent centre for education in a 19th-century Grade II listed building, on 42 acres (17 ha) of grounds, including gardens, pastures, woodland and a natural spring overlooking the Stroud Valley in Gloucestershire, England.

== Setting ==
The main house, a Tudor Gothic villa dating mostly from 1845 with a few earlier remnants, is a large gabled residence in the Cotswold style adjoined by a number of other buildings, providing a facility for meetings, conferences and courses.

There are ten acres (4.0 ha) of woodland bounding the estate, and acres of grass land managed by Stroud Community Agriculture; a Victorian half-walled garden growing fruit, herbs, flowers and vegetables for the house; an award-winning pond and wetlands system processing household output; mature ornamental grounds with a sycamore and beside it the Hawkwood spring.

No formal qualifications are needed to participate in Hawkwood's courses.

== History ==
=== The Grove ===
First records of the estate go back to 1688 when it was part of the parish of Painswick, was known as The Grove and belonged to John Mayo, who died in 1715 leaving it to his daughters. Hestor, one of the daughters, was married to Samuel Capel, a Stroud clothier, who bought out the shares of the other daughters. Over the next years, the Capel family built up an estate of 822 acres in Painswick, Slad and Stroud, of which The Grove was the centre. At some point before 1842, this house had been badly damaged by fire.

It was William Capel (d. 1883) who engaged George Basevi, architect of the Subscription Rooms and the wings at Painswick House, to rebuild the house as it stands today, and a descendant, Lt.-Col. William Capel, who sold the bulk of the estate in 1914, the house on the remaining 40 acres being sold four years after his death in 1932 to Colonel Murray. Colonel Murray named it "Hawkwood" after the colourful 14th century mercenary Sir John Hawkwood, commander of the legendary White Company, whom he particularly admired.

=== Founding of Hawkwood CFT ===
In 1947, the house was sold to Roland and Lily Whincop. They had become interested in Rudolf Steiner’s philosophy after a visit to Sunfield Homes at Clent Grove, Worcester, where they experienced the quality of care and devotion given to the Special Needs children there, and wished to found a respite centre for the staff of the home and for others seeking periods of reflection. At a conference in Wynstones School they shared their intention and were told that the Hawkwood estate was up for sale. They bought the estate but Roland Whincop died shortly thereafter.

Margaret Bennell, co-founder of Wynstones school at Brookthorpe, was then enlisted to help, whom Lily Whincop had come to know at the Wynstones conferences. Lily Whincop is reported to have stated, "I have a house, you have a plan," and in November 1947, the new school was opened. Hawkwood started with 12 students at Easter 1948, one of them Eileen Brooking, who was later to become vice-principal, and on 28 March 1949 opened officially as Hawkwood College which was later rebranded as Hawkwood Centre for Future Thinking in 2019.

Lily Whincop died at the age of 70 in 1957 and Margaret Bennell entitled the obituary she wrote "The Mother of Hawkwood".

=== Further developments ===
In 1965 Margaret Bennell asked Bernard Nesfield-Cookson and his wife, Eileen to consider taking over the college from her. This they did in 1971. Margaret Bennell died in 1966, with Benedict Wood, Isabel Bruce-Smith from Wynstones and Bernard Williams running Hawkwood in the interim. Benedict Wood remained there until his death in 1993.

For 22 years Bernard and Eileen Nesfield-Cookson ran the college as co-principals. Both had attended Steiner schools themselves, Eileen being a pupil of Margaret Bennel. Both had taught at Wynstones for a number of years. Bernard, a close friend of Sir George Trevelyan, had for many years lectured at Attingham Park and, on the basis of this experience, transformed Hawkwood into a facility for short-term residential courses. These, by the time he handed over Hawkwood to his successors, numbered some 100 per year.

== Today ==
On the basis of its founding anthroposophical ethos, Hawkwood still provides a centre for short courses on the theme of creative exploration. These include personal and spiritual development, arts & crafts, music, health & well-being as well as nature and sustainability.

There are six meeting rooms including a large hall, library and two spacious studios. Overnight accommodation comprises twenty nine bedrooms with original features, looking out over the valley.

Hawkwood CFT is also home to the Bardic Chair of Hawkwood with the annual Bard of Hawkwood competition being held on the grounds.

== Partners ==
Amber Sculpture Studio with artist David Lovemore, doing clay modelling, wood carving, stone carving and basic casting.

Waldorf Early Childhood Teacher Training A two-year part-time training course based at Hawkwood. Course organiser Lynne Oldfield is author of Free to Learn: Introducing Steiner Waldorf Early Childhood Education. The course is a validated Level 5 diploma.

School of Homeopathy Established in 1981, it has been based at Hawkwood for a number of years.

Waldorf College runs outdoor activities at Hawkwood for its Stroud-based Bridging the Gap educational programme for young people aged 16–19.

Stroud Community Agriculture is a co-operative of two hundred members managing an organic/biodynamic farm in the grounds.

Hawkwood CFT is a member of the Adult Residential Colleges Association.
