= Ovalhouse =

Former theatre in Lambeth, London, England

- Oval House Theatre
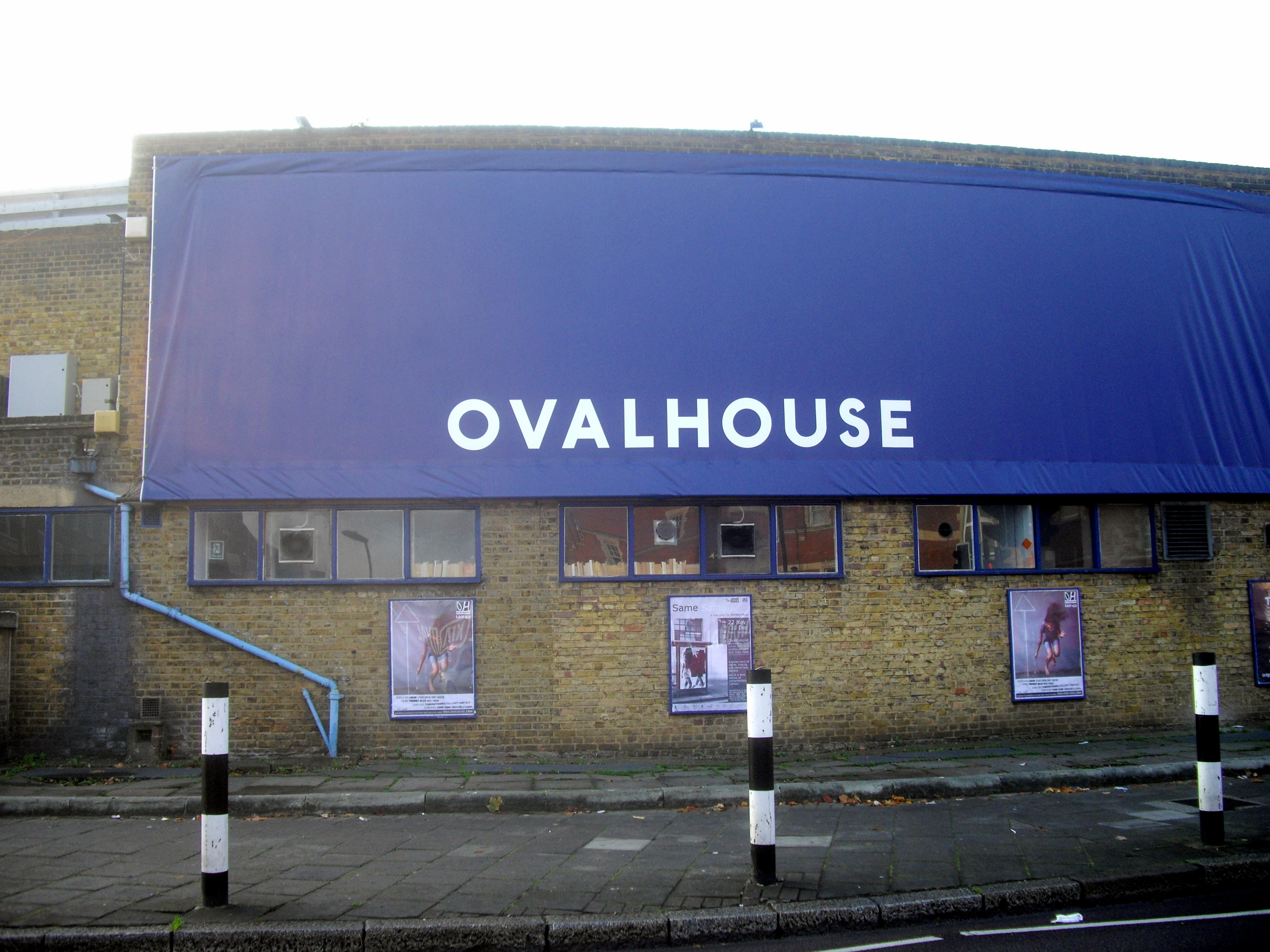
- Interactive map of Ovalhouse
- Address: Kennington Oval; London, SE11; United Kingdom
- Coordinates: 51.4828°N 0.1137°W
- Capacity: Theatre Downstairs: 200 seats Theatre Upstairs: 70 seats
- Type: Off-West End
- Public transit: Oval

Construction
- Opened: 1930s
- Closed: 2020
- Years active: 80

Website
- ovalhouse.com

Ovalhouse, formerly called Oval House Theatre, was an Off-West End theatre in the London Borough of Lambeth, located at 52–54 Kennington Oval, London, SE11 5SW. It closed in 2020, and moved to Brixton, becoming the Brixton House theatre (located at 385 Coldharbour Lane, SW9 8GL).

== History ==
The roots of Ovalhouse can be traced back to the 1930s and its foundations, as Christ Church (Oxford) Clubs, by the graduates of Christ Church, Oxford. Young people from disadvantaged areas in South London were able to access sports activities, skills training and supervised leisure activities through membership of the club.

Ovalhouse's reputation as one of the most important centres for pioneer fringe theatre groups dates from the 1960s, when the club underwent a radical change in the policy of the club with the arrival of newly appointed warden, Peter Oliver. Oliver refocused the club's activities from sport to drama and became the artistic founder of Oval House Theatre. Oliver staged the first theatrical production at the site; A Taste of Honey by Shelagh Delaney.

Oval House Theatre played a key part in supporting the experimental theatre companies of the 1960s and 1970s, the emergence of gay, lesbian and women's theatre in the 1970s and 1980s and the development of new Black and Asian writing in the 1990s and into the next millennium. Following a rebrand in 2011, the theatre relaunched itself as Ovalhouse, and continued to programme innovative, cutting edge theatre.

Notable artists who began their careers at Ovalhouse include Steven Berkoff, Howard Brenton, Pierce Brosnan, Stella Duffy, Tamsin Greig, Jim Sweeney, David Hare (who worked at the theatre as a stage manager), Tim Roth, Andrew Bridgmont and Salman Rushdie.

== Programmes ==
Ovalhouse had two theatre spaces, the Theatre Downstairs (up to 200 seats) and the Theatre Upstairs (70 seats); there was also a cafe-bar, gallery space and rehearsal rooms available for public hire. After 2011, the cafe-bar was also used as a venue for live-music and spoken word events.

In addition to the professional theatre programme, Ovalhouse had a Participation and Youth Arts department working with young people and vulnerable adults. Its 33% London programme offered an alternative route into professional theatre for aspiring artists aged 18–25.

== Ovalhouse in Brixton ==
In 2020 Ovalhouse closed, in anticipation of its move to purpose-built premises in Brixton, which subsequently opened as Brixton House in 2022.

== Former Ovalhouse buildings ==
As a result of the move to Brixton, the existing premises were sold, along with the adjacent Grade II listed White House, which had been used for arts administration. The White House is the former vicarage for St Mark's Church, Kennington; there is a blue plaque commemorating the birth of Field Marshal Montgomery, who was born there. The two buildings have been bought by Surrey County Cricket Club, for conversion into hotel accommodation for cricket players at The Oval. The Ovalhouse building will be demolished, while the White House will be refurbished.
