= The Bells of Hell Go Ting-a-ling-a-ling =

British airmen's song

"The Bells of Hell Go Ting-a-ling-a-ling" is a British airmen's song from World War I.

It is apparently a parody of another popular song of the time entitled "She Only Answered 'Ting-a-ling-a-ling'". It is featured in the Brendan Behan's play The Hostage (1958).

== Lyrics ==
The lyrics are:

The Bells of Hell go ting-a-ling-a-ling
For you but not for me:
For me the angels sing-a-ling-a-ling,
They've got the goods for me.

Oh! Death, where is thy sting-a-ling-a-ling?
Oh! Grave, thy victory?
The Bells of Hell go ting-a-ling-a-ling
For you but not for me.

Lines five and six quote St Paul's words on the resurrection in 1 Corinthians 15: 55, used in the burial service: "O death, where is thy sting? O grave, where is thy victory?" There are alternative, darker lyrics for the third and fourth lines, used in the original stage musical Oh, What a Lovely War!.

And the little devils all sing-aling-aling
For you but not for me

The Behan version is:

The Bells of Hell go ting-a-ling-a-ling
For you but not for me:
Oh! Death, where is thy sting-a-ling-a-ling?
Oh! Grave, thy victory?

If you meet the undertaker,
Or the young man from the Pru,
Get a pint with what's left over,
Now I'll say good-bye to you.

== 1966 film ==
A 1966 Mirisch Productions World War I war film with the title The Bells of Hell go Ting-a-ling-a-ling starring Gregory Peck and Ian McKellen, directed by David Miller and with a screenplay by Roald Dahl, was abandoned after five weeks filming in Switzerland. The film, depicting the air raid on the Zeppelin base at Friedrichshafen, was abandoned after early snow in the Alps.

== Salvation Army ==
The song also has links with the Salvation Army, as referenced in "The Mixer and Server, Volume 20" of 1911: "In London, the Salvation Army lassies and other street-praying bands are singing a song that has become universally popular in the crowded sections of the city."

It is notable that the lyrics of this Salvation Army version differ slightly both from the established "angels" version and the "devils" version in Oh, What a Lovely War!:

The bells of hell go ding-aling-ling
For you, but not for me;
The sweet-voiced angels sing-a-ling-ling
Through all eternity.
Oh, death, where is thy sting-a-ling-ling;
Oh, grave, thy victory!
No ding-a-ling-ling, no sting-a-ling-ling.
But sing-a-ling-ling for me.
