= The Wilted Rose =

2023 Australian film

- Directed by: Elise Lamb
- Written by: Elise Lamb
- Produced by: Elise Lamb; Madison Sturgess
- Starring: Kirsty Sturgess; Matthew Scully; Pacharo Mzembe
- Cinematography: Jake Koning
- Edited by: Nadya de Vos
- Music by: Adrian Diery
- Production company: The Roaring Ones
- Distributed by: SBS On Demand
- Release date: October 28, 2023 (Brisbane International Film Festival)
- Running time: 15 minutes
- Country: Australia
- Language: English

The Wilted Rose is a 2023 Australian live-action short film written and directed by Elise Lamb.

The film was produced by Lamb and Madison Sturgess in partnership with not-for-profit organisation The Centre For Women & Co. with cinematography by Jake Koning, production design by Jodie Taylor, an original score by Adrian Diery and film editing by Nadya de Vos.

The film had its world premiere screening in competition at the Brisbane International Film Festival where it won Best Brisbane Short Film.

The film was also a 2024 contender for the Australian Academy of Cinema and Television Arts Award (AACTA) for Best Short Film.

The film was acquired by SBS Australia and premiered on SBS On Demand on November 1st, 2024. The producers donated 100% of the buyout fee to The Centre For Women & Co.

== Plot ==
A musically gifted woman attempts to leave an abusive relationship with dire consequences.

== Cast ==
- Kirsty Sturgess as Bryony
- Matthew Scully as Ed
- Pacharo Mzembe as Joseph

== Production ==
=== Funding ===
The film was funded by the Logan City Council's Regional Arts Development Fund (RADF) and received the Brisbane Women's Club's Charitable Giving Grant. The film was also successfully funded on Kickstarter and sponsored by Delaney & Delaney Solicitors.

=== Filming ===
The film was shot on location in Logan City, Queensland, Australia over three days.

=== Music ===
The score was composed by Adrian Diery and titled Vals Wouj which is Haitian Creole that translates to Red Waltz in English, a tribute to Kirsty Sturgess' heritage.

== Reception ==
=== Critical response ===
Script coverage from Slamdance Film Festival stated "In just a few pages, Elise has created a lot of tension between the couple and represented very well the different aspects of an abuser. The psychology of the characters are very well explored".

Upon winning Best Brisbane Short Film at the Brisbane International Film Festival the Jury stated "The Wilted Rose is a haunting, disturbing and impactful film that challenges audiences to sit with the confronting issue of domestic violence and coercive control. The film is powerfully profound in its structure, imagery and message. A must-see".

=== Awards and nominations ===
Year	Award	Category	Recipients	Result
2024	Underdog Film Festival	Best Made in Logan	Elise Lamb and Madison Sturgess	Nominated
2024	Mona Brand Award for Women Stage and Screen Writers	Early Career Writer Award	Elise Lamb	Nominated
2024	Australian Academy of Cinema and Television Arts Award (AACTA)	Best Short Film	Elise Lamb and Madison Sturgess	Contender
2023	Australian Cinematographers Society (ACS)	State & Territory Awards (Queensland): Short Film	Jake Koning	Silver Award
2023	Brisbane International Film Festival	Best Brisbane Short Film	Elise Lamb and Madison Sturgess	Won
2023	The British Short Film Awards	Best Production Design (Long-Listed)	Jodie Taylor	Nominated
2022	Los Angeles International Screenplay Awards	Best Short Screenplay (Semi-Finalist)	Elise Lamb	Nominated
