= Peter Oliver (theatre director) =

- Born: Peter Caddwalladder Oliver; August 11, 1926; Porthcawl, Wales
- Died: September 18, 2007 (aged 81); Shelburne, Nova Scotia, Canada
- Education: Swansea University, Swansea, Wales
- Known for: Acting, directing, youth work
- Spouse: Joan Oliver (m.1951)

Peter Oliver (11 August 1926 – 18 September 2007) was a Welsh-born British actor, youth worker and theatre director. He is known for transforming the Christ Church (Oxford) United Clubs youth club at Oval House into a notable theatre.

After leaving Oval House, he acted with Pip Simmons and his company. In 1985, he emigrated to Canada with his wife, where he returned to social work. Upon his retirement, he continued to produce theatre, including founding Basement Theatre, a community theatre group in Shelburne, Nova Scotia.

== Personal life ==
Oliver has one daughter and one granddaughter. His wife Joan was born on November 23, 1929, and died on June 17, 2016, at the age of 86.

In memory of Oliver and his wife, the Shelburne County Arts Council awards the Peter and Joan Oliver Scholarship to students entering post-secondary education in the arts.
