= Theatre Workshop =

British theatre group

Theatre Workshop is a theatre group whose long-serving director was Joan Littlewood. Many actors of the 1950s and 1960s received their training and first exposure with the company, many of its productions were transferred to theatres in the West End, and some, such as Oh, What a Lovely War! and A Taste of Honey, were made into films.

== Formation ==
Joan Littlewood and Ewan MacColl met and married in 1934, while both were working with the Theatre of Action. They started their own collaboration developing radio plays for the BBC, taking scripts and cast from local workers. However, both MI5 and the Special Branch maintained a watch on the couple because of their support for the Communist Party of Great Britain. Littlewood was precluded from working for the BBC as a children's programme presenter and some of MacColl's work was banned from broadcast.

In the late 1930s Littlewood and MacColl formed an acting troupe called the Theatre Union. This was dissolved in 1940, but in 1945 many of its former members joined Joan Littlewood's new venture, the Theatre Workshop. In 1948 the company toured Czechoslovakia and Sweden.

== Theatre Royal, Stratford East ==
=== Joan Littlewood (1953–1979) ===
Touring was not successful for the company, and in 1953 Joan Littlewood took the gamble of taking a lease on a permanent base at the Theatre Royal Stratford East, London. The theatre was derelict, no funds were available for renovation, and the actors cleaned and painted the auditorium between rehearsals. To save money the cast and crew slept in the dressing rooms (while Littlewood went back to her home in Blackheath). The theatre opened on 2 February 1953 with Twelfth Night.

MacColl had not supported the move to London, and left the company to concentrate on folk music. With Littlewood, as director, Gerry Raffles (1928–1975) as manager and John Bury as designer, the Theatre Workshop continued to present a mixed programme of classics and modern plays with contemporary themes. The cast and crew (again excluding Littlewood, who was then living with Raffles) lived and worked as a commune, sharing the many tasks associated with running and maintaining a theatre, and with a duty roster for "chef of the week".

In April 1953, a request for funds was met with

The Finance Committee at their last meeting was unable to recommend any grant for the purposes you have in mind. However, the Committee indicated that they would be prepared to assist, where possible in the matter of publicity, providing this could be done without cost to the Committee

Success came following an invitation from Claude Planson, the director of the Paris International Festival of Theatre, to represent England at the festival in 1955. The company travelled to Paris with costumes in their suitcases and scenery under their arms. In May 1955 Theatre Workshop presented acclaimed productions of Volpone and Arden of Faversham at the Théâtre Hébertot, though the company had to beg their fares home. The Arts Council and critics became aware of the company, and they returned to Paris with six more productions. In 1963 they won the Award of the Grande Prix du Festival for Oh, What a Lovely War!.

In 1955 Littlewood directed, and took the leading role in, the London premiere of Bertolt Brecht's Mother Courage and Her Children.

Finances continued to be tight, but the company was kept afloat with transfers of many successful plays to the West End stage and later, film productions. This workload put a severe strain on resources, as these transfers meant that experienced cast members were tied up for long periods and had to be replaced in the repertory.

Until 1968, the Theatres Act 1843 required scripts to be submitted for approval by the Lord Chamberlain's Office. This caused conflicts because of the improvisational theatre techniques used by Littlewood to develop plays for performance. She was twice prosecuted and fined for allowing the company to improvise in performance.

The Fun Palace was an ambitious multi-arts project conceived by Littlewood and the company in conjunction with the architect Cedric Price. The project was never built, but the concept may have influenced later projects such the Centre Pompidou in Paris. Another project conceived in the 1960s was the formation of an acting school associated with Theatre Workshop to inspire a new generation of actors with the ideas and techniques of Littlewood. Although Littlewood herself strongly disapproved, believing that acting was an unteachable skill, the East 15 Acting School became successful. It is now based in its own premises in Loughton. In 2000 the school became part of the University of Essex.

By the end of the 1960s both the company and the theatre were under threat. The Theatre Workshop presented revivals of its own productions and a campaign was begun to save the theatre from redevelopment as part of a new shopping centre planned to transform the centre of Stratford. Audiences mounted a campaign to save the theatre and for many years it remained open in the centre of a building site.

In 1975 Gerry Raffles died of diabetes and in 1979 Littlewood moved to France, and ceased to direct.

Many well-regarded television and stage actors began their professional careers at Theatre Workshop under Littlewood's tutelage. They included Yootha Joyce, Glynn Edwards, Harry H. Corbett, George A. Cooper, Richard Harris, Stephen Lewis, Howard Goorney, Brian Murphy, Murray Melvin, Nigel Hawthorne and Barbara Windsor. The last three were cast by the director Ken Russell to appear in the film version of The Boy Friend (1971) with Twiggy.

=== Philip Hedley (1979–2004) ===
Philip Hedley had worked as an assistant to Joan Littlewood for some years, and took over the artistic directorship on her departure from the theatre. He continued her educational work, and engaged with new Asian and Black audiences as the local demographic changed. The theatre continued Littlewood's agenda of portraying and expressing the experience of local people in East London.

In 1999 Hedley began the Musical Theatre Initiatives scheme to encourage new writing in musical theatre. In 2004, after 25 years as artistic director, he retired.

=== Kerry Michael (2004–2017) ===
Kerry Michael MBE is a second-generation Greek Cypriot who was born and brought up in North London. He joined Stratford East in 1997, as an associate director. He became director in September 2004. His manifesto is to bring London's new communities to the stage, and portray their experiences as second- and third-generation emigrants. Michael has upheld the theatre’s commitment to develop new work and to provide a platform for those voices underrepresented in the ever-changing communities of East London.

In 2007 the theatre was nominated for an Olivier Award for "presenting a powerful season of provocative work that reaches new audiences". Its hip-hop dance production of Boy Blue’s Pied Piper won an Oliver in the same year. In the following year Kerry’s production of Cinderella was also nominated for an Olivier.

Michael has numerous directing credits. Highlights include new plays by Cosh Omar, The Battle of Green Lanes and The Great Extension; Jamaica House by Paul Sirett, which had a site-specific performance on the top floor of a tower block in Stepney; new musicals such as Make Some Noise and One Dance Will Do; Ray Davies’s Come Dancing, winner of the What’s On Stage Best Musical; and John Adam's song play I Was Looking At The Ceiling And Then I Saw The Sky.

Michael is Chair of Stratford Cultural Forum, a board member of Stratford Renaissance Partnership, a trustee of Discover, which provides creative, play and learning opportunities for children and their carers in Stratford, and a member of UK Equity’s International Committee for Artists' Freedom.

In 2018 he was awarded a Freedom of the City of London and made a Member of the Order of the Empire for services to the Arts in the Queen's Birthday honours.

== Selected productions ==
=== Stage ===
- 1952 Uranium 235 by Ewan MacColl
- 1953 Twelfth Night by William Shakespeare (debut production at the Theatre Royal, Stratford East)
- 1955 Volpone by Ben Jonson
- 1955 Arden of Faversham (a part of the Shakespeare Apocrypha)
- 1955 Mother Courage and Her Children by Bertholt Brecht
- 1957 You Won’t Always Be On Top by Henry Chapman
- 1957 The Quare Fellow by Brendan Behan
- 1958 The Hostage by Brendan Behan
- 1958 A Taste of Honey by Shelagh Delaney
- 1959 Fings Ain't Wot They Used T'Be by Frank Norman, music by Lionel Bart
- 1959 Make Me An Offer (starring Diana Coupland)
- 1960 Sparrers Can't Sing [sic] by Stephen Lewis
- 1963 Oh, What a Lovely War! by Joan Littlewood, and cast.

=== Film ===
- 1961 A Taste of Honey
- 1962 Sparrers Can't Sing [sic] — released as Sparrows Can't Sing in the US
- 1969 Oh! What a Lovely War

== Former company members ==
- Thelma Barlow
- Joby Blanshard
- James Booth
- Peter Bridgmont
- Barbara Brown see Peter Bridgmont
- Thomas Baptiste
- Avis Bunnage
- Isla Cameron
- George Cooper
- Harry H. Corbett
- Barbara Cording
- Diana Coupland
- Stephen Dartnell
- Shelagh Delaney
- Bill Douglas
- Shirley Dynevor
- Glynn Edwards
- Frank Elliott
- Dudley Foster
- Howard Goorney
- Harry Greene
- Sheila Hancock
- Richard Harris
- Nigel Hawthorne
- Ken Hill
- Yootha Joyce
- John Junkin
- Roy Kinnear
- Marjie Lawrence
- Stephen Lewis
- Ewan MacColl
- Murray Melvin
- Brian Murphy
- Alex Murray
- Frank Norman
- Jimmy Perry
- Pat Phoenix
- Gerry Raffles
- David Scase
- George Sewell
- Victor Spinetti
- John Thaw
- Barbara Windsor
- Barbara Young

== Bibliography ==
- Coren, Michael; Theatre Royal: 100 Years of Stratford East, Quartet Books, 1984; ISBN 0-7043-2474-1
- Goorney, Howard; The Theatre Workshop Story, Methuen Publishing Ltd, 1981; ISBN 0-413-47610-3
- Littlewood, Joan; Joan's Book: Joan Littlewood's Peculiar History as She Tells it, Methuen Publishing Ltd, 1994; ISBN 0-413-64070-1
