= Claire Porter =

American choreographer/comedian (born 1942)

- Born: December 23, 1942 (age 83)
- Education: College of New Rochelle (B.A.) Ohio State (M.A.)
- Occupations: Choreographer, Comedian

Claire Porter (born December 23, 1942) is an American choreographer/comedian known for blending comedic monologues with dance movement. She is also a performer, author, and dance educator whose dance works, which she refers to as Portables, have been produced by various dance organizations, college theater programs and venues around the world.

== Biography ==
Claire Porter was born in New Britain, Connecticut, where, as a child, she was a star athlete and danced in a local studio. After she earned her BA in Mathematics from the College of New Rochelle in New York, she became a computer programmer for G.E. Analytical Engineering in Schenectady, New York. Porter returned to her dancing roots after witnessing a performance by Maria Tallchief. She then attended Sonoma State University in California from 1969 to 1973. At Sonoma State, she studied dance, taught Family Dance, Exercise, and Children's Dance, and directed a dance company of 12 members. Porter eventually moved from California to Ohio to study dance at Ohio State University. It was there that Porter discovered Laban Movement Analysis and began exploring gestures, acting, writing, and voice. She later received her certification for Laban Movement Analysis at the Laban/Bartenieff Institute of Movement Studies NYC. She earned her MA in Dance from Ohio State and has continued the exploration of gestural movement as a teacher, choreographer and performer.

Porter has been a resident of Teaneck, New Jersey.

== Major works ==
=== Portables ===
Porter's Portables are a number of comedic movement monologues and group theater dance pieces. Although these works have taken the comedic route, they were not initially created to be funny. The comedic interpretation was a result of how her audience viewed her works. She came up with the name Portables when she was leaving Ohio State University. It is a pun on Porter's last name as well as a sentimental way of signifying that she planned to take her dance works with her when she graduated. She is also said to call her works Portables because they can be performed in both small and large spaces. Each Portable is about 12 minutes in length, so about 5 or 6 Portables are performed at each concert.

==== Portables: solo works and some brief descriptions ====
- Namely, Muscles
- Piano – A pianist is ready to perform for an audience, but the piano hasn't arrived
- Lost in the Modern – Contemplation of modern life and art
- Green Dress Circle
- Fund Raiser – A solicitor for funds has to deal with a hostile audience
- Fitness Digest – A physical fitness teacher conducts a class of imaginary pupils
- Homestretch
- Dining Out – A calm diner grows increasingly tipsy.
- Slipping into Weather
- Lecture
- Ordering Greens
- Mulch
- If My Words Wore Boots
- Planted Feet

==== Portables: group works and some brief descriptions ====
- It’s About Time
- Time Walking
- Walk Walk Walk
- Between the Lines
- Frieze Frame
- Boot Reports
- Too Much on My Plate – Waiters and waitresses struggle with more than just the specials of the day
- Sweeps
- Panel – Two men and two women make up the International Decisions Panel, which makes decisions about the possibility of making decisions.

== Teaching experiences ==
- Grand Valley College where she worked on gestural pieces including a piece in American Sign Language
- Columbia Teachers College where she taught Choreography and Laban Movement Analysis

== Books by Claire Porter ==
- Dynamics in a Bag (self-published) – teaches about the range of dynamics in movement
- Namely, Muscles (self-published) – book of 37 poems on over 68 muscles
- Don’t Answer That (under construction) – bag of question cards to help choreographers create dance pieces
- Laban Bag – The Effort Qualities (under construction) – bag of theatre game cards for understanding Laban's Effort Qualities
