= Stockwell Playhouse =

Former theatre in London, England

Coordinates: 51.4755°N 0.1317°W

Stockwell Playhouse (known as the LOST Theatre until 2015) was a 180-seat Off West End Fringe theatre based in Stockwell, South London, dedicated to promoting and developing young and emerging talent.

A variety of different shows were produced throughout the year there included One Act and Five Minute Festivals.

In addition to the auditorium, the venue had two rehearsal spaces for hire by performers. There was also an award-winning bar space on the first floor called Bar 208, with a variety of drinks and beers on tap.

== History ==
The LOST Theatre was founded by Cecil Hayter in 1979 at the London Oratory School as an after-school theatre club, taking its name from the school's initials.

In 1982 LOST was relocated to a new venue on Fulham Broadway. At this 100-seat black box, LOST was host to over 100 plays and festivals for the next 17 years until re-development of the area forced the company to look for a new home. During the next 10 years LOST was an itinerant company, hiring other theatre spaces in order to continue its work whilst branching out into Europe taking shows to Spain and Russia. In 2004 negotiations began for the acquisition of a new home in the London Borough of Lambeth (208 Wandsworth Road). This building opened in January 2010.

The theatre was a featured venue in the 2015 BBC3 series South Side Stories. The theater bar received the 2013 Offie for Best Theatre Bar hosted by OffWestEnd.com.

In 2017, LOST Theatre changed its name to Stockwell Playhouse. In November 2019 it closed permanently. Stockwell Playhouse (@StockwellPHouse) Tweeted: All done we’re afraid. It’s been a great ride - but commercial pressure made it impossible for us to continue.

Sir Derek Jacobi was the theatre's arts patron.

== Productions and usage ==
In addition to putting on in-house productions, Stockwell Playhouse served as a theatre space available for itinerant or touring companies to hire.

Stockwell Playhouse also produced annual One Act and Five-Minute festivals. The One Act Festival allowed writers to submit works between 20 and 45 minutes in length to the Festival Artistic Committee. Winners of the festival received a monetary prize. The Five Minute Festival had three rules: submissions must be less than five minutes in length, they must have a narrative thread, and at least either the writer, director or cast must be under 27 years old. The pieces could cover a wide range of areas including: dance, theatre, spoken word, poetry, physical theatre, ensemble work, and devised work. The winners received a cash prize. The theatre also supported new writers from the festival with space and supported bursaries to create a new full length piece of work.

Throughout the year, several acting and dance teachers conducted classes in the rehearsal studios each week, and there were twice weekly acting classes for children as well as a summer school.
