= Maison Bertaux =

Pâtisserie in London, England

Coordinates: 51.51332°N 0.13025°W

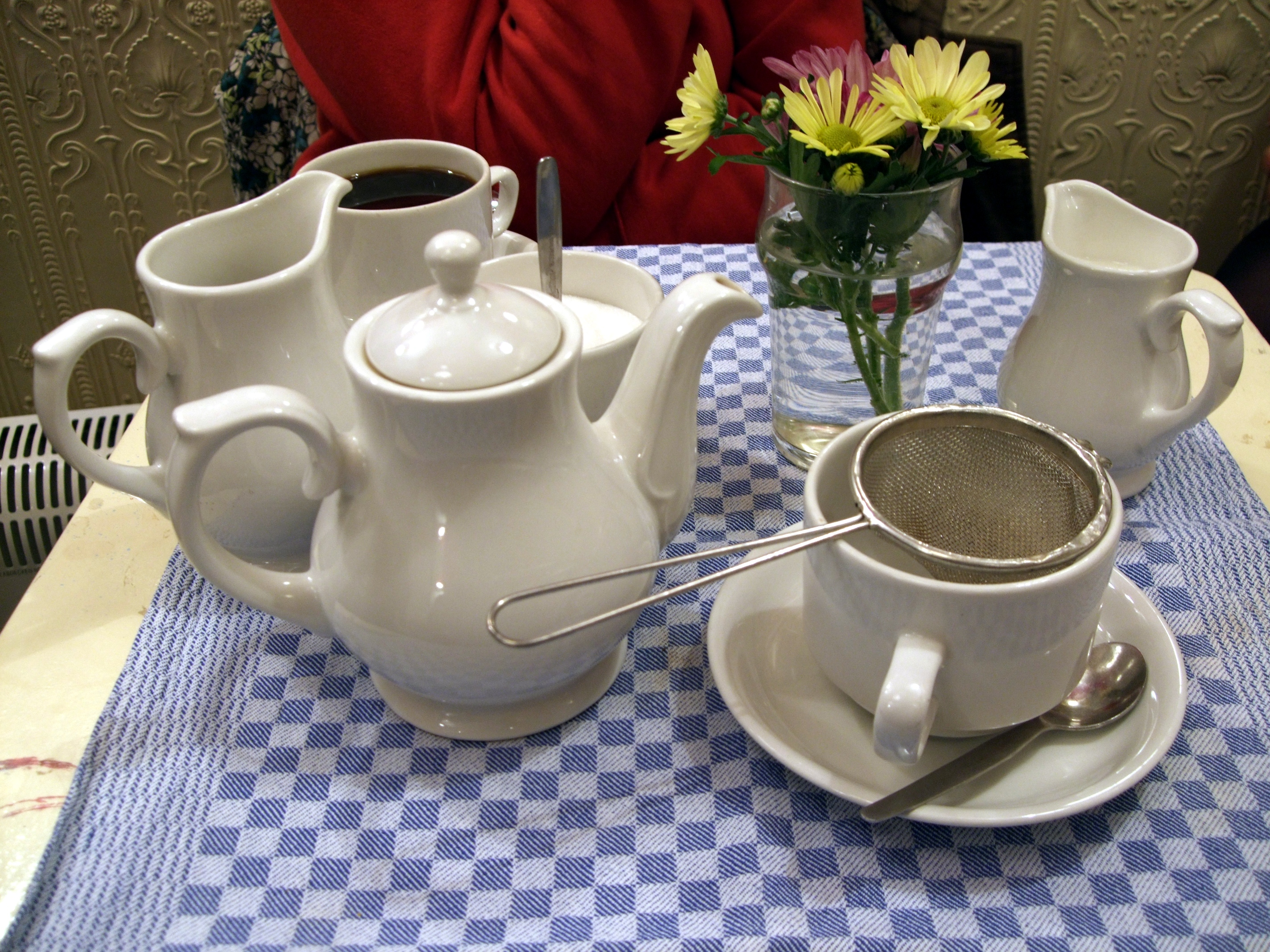
Tea served at Maison Bertaux, 2008

Maison Bertaux is a French pâtisserie in Greek Street, Soho, London. The shop began in 1871, making it the oldest pâtisserie in London.

== Maison Bertaux ==
Maison Bertaux was founded in 1871 by a French communard from Paris named Bertaux. It is at 28 Greek Street, Soho, London, next door to the Coach and Horses pub; Maison Bertaux is the oldest pâtisserie in London. It is no accident that the shop opened at this location, for it was in the heart of the French community in London in the late 19th century. The historic French Protestant church is in nearby Soho Square, while the Catholic Notre Dame de France is in Leicester Place.

Since 1988, the managers of Maison Bertaux are sisters Michele and Tania Wade; Michele has worked there since she was 17 years old. When they started to manage the shop, only one type of tea was being served; they now serve twenty varieties. In 2000, Maison Bertaux delivered a traditional wedding cake to a Birmingham wedding party. The shop contains a piano with a copy of The Art of French Baking on top of it, and three of the mirrors on the walls carry the inscriptions Liberté, égalité, fraternité. To celebrate Bastille Day, the shop creates a tableau vivant. The shop is situated near to the former location of Central Saint Martins art school, (Note: Central Saint Martins relocated to King's Cross in 2011.) and also has an art gallery situated on the upper floor, which is run by Tania Wade. In 2013, the gallery hosted an exhibition of Harry Hill's paintings of celebrities including Bruce Forsyth, Ken Livingstone and Anthea Turner. The upper floor is also used as a party venue with a capacity of 20.

Visitors have included Derek Jarman, Steve McQueen, Howard Hodgkin, Grayson Perry, Nicole Kidman, Noel Fielding, Andrew Irving, Damon Albarn, Martin Freeman, John Hurt and Bob Geldof. Maison Berteaux also made Lily Allen's wedding cake, and hosted Alexander McQueen's 25th birthday party.

In 2020, Maison Bertaux set up a crowdfunding campaign to save the shop, after being forced to close it due to the coronavirus pandemic.
