= Wynstones School =

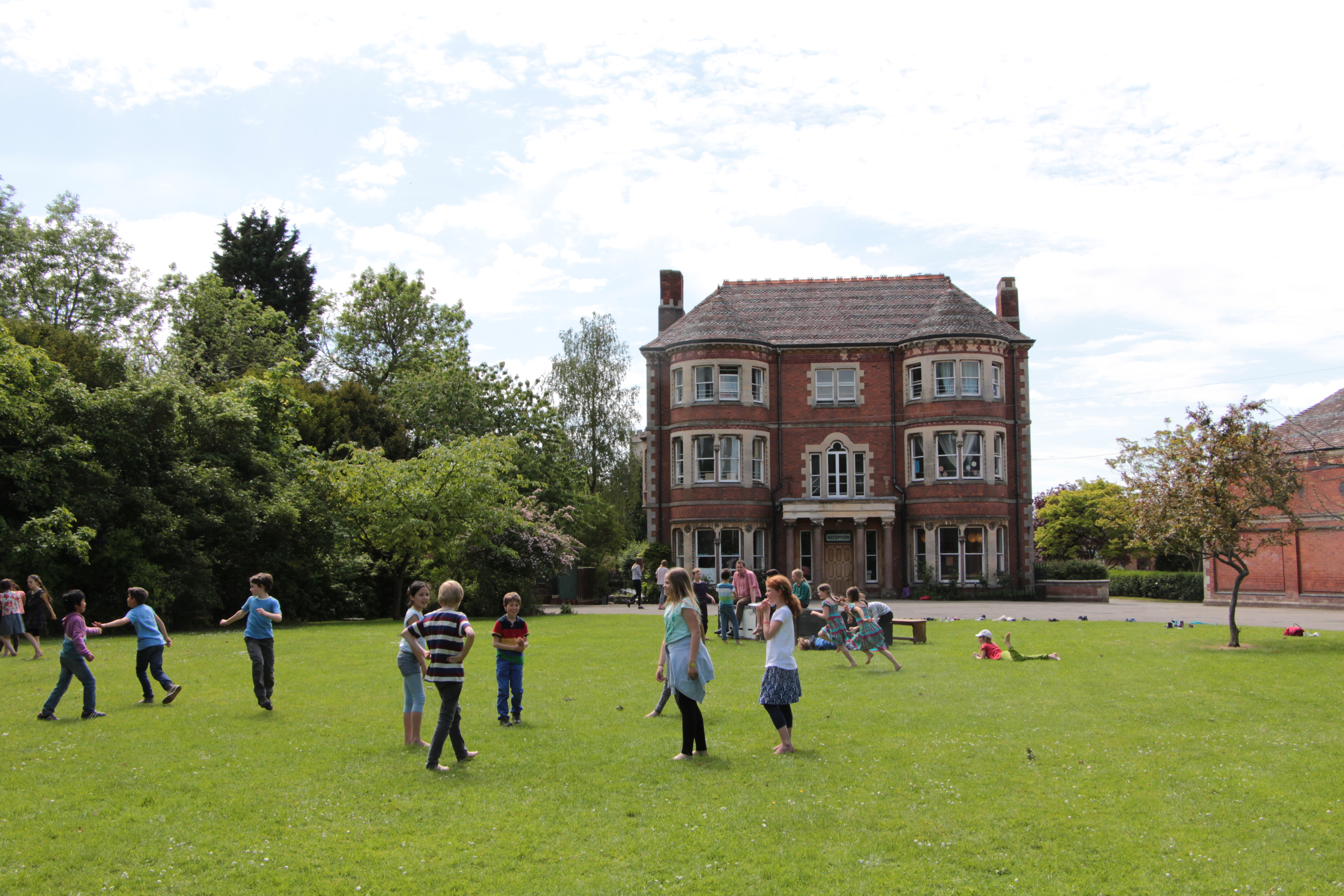
- The Main Building at Wynstones

Location
- Church Lane; Whaddon, Gloucester, Gloucestershire, GL4 0UF; England; 51.822225°N 2.24304°W

Information
- Type: Private Steiner school
- Established: 1937
- Founder: Margaret Bennell, Cora Nokes, Benedict and Norah Wood
- Closed: 2020
- Department for Education URN: 115793 Tables
- Gender: Co-educational
- Age: 3 to 18
- Telephone: 01452 429220
- Upper School Film '16: https://vimeo.com/148995849
- Website: http://www.wynstones.com

Wynstones School was a Steiner Waldorf school in Gloucestershire, set on 11 acres near Gloucester. It took pupils from pre-school through to university entrance and has an enrolment of around 275 students.

== History ==
Wynstones was founded on the initiative of Margaret Bennell, Cora Nokes, Benedict Wood with his wife Norah, and John Benians, all who wished to change their educational direction. Margaret Bennell and Cora Nokes, two teachers from Crouch End, London had met Benedict Wood (H E Wood), who ran a prep school in Dorset, at a teaching conference in London. John Benians joined them shortly after the school opened in 1937 along with Isobel Smith, who had wanted to join them at the outset but had to work out her contract before she was free to do so. They were soon joined by several other teachers including some, like Bettina Mellinger, Rudi Lissau and Maria and Norbert Glas that had come to England after the closure of the German Waldorf schools by the Nazi government. The school grew rapidly over the War years, being in the countryside away from the bombing of the cities. Its hostel became a home to many children including those of the Camphill community co-workers in Scotland. The high school was established after the War and the land and new buildings surrounding the original manor house developed.

The school is now closed following significant safeguarding concerns reported by Ofsted in their inspection in January 2020. The property was sold and is now the location of Valley Bridge School, a specialist independent school. The operating charity changed its name to Waldorf Learning Foundation Limited, and changed its focus to the provision of Steiner Waldorf teacher training.

== Campus ==
Situated in rural surroundings between Gloucester and Stroud, the school is set on 11 acres of extensive grounds, allowing for outdoor building and gardening pursuits as well as accommodating the sports hall, sports field and tennis courts.

The main building provides a central core, and each of the classroom blocks has been placed around it to create a kind of village centre – helping to engender a sense of community for pupils, parents, teachers and staff within the school.

The Barn, the school's theatre, has enabled performance and visual arts to be at the heart of Wynstones School education and many memorable plays have been put on by pupils throughout the years. These have included King Lear, Romeo & Juliet, An Inspector Calls, Amadeus, The House of Bernarda Alba and most recently, Les Misérables.

Boarding places offered to international students are with school families.

== Admissions and school programme ==
Admission is not based on academic selection and children with a wide range of abilities are accepted.

The school offers a comprehensive curriculum based on Steiner-Waldorf education with numerous extra-curricular activities, arts and cultural events and a comprehensive GCSE & A Level programme. It is a full member of the Steiner Waldorf Schools Fellowship in the United Kingdom.

There is a parent and child group, for 0- to 3-year-olds, where parents and carers bring babies and toddlers to morning sessions on several days of the week. They spend a morning a week in school where they can experience some kindergarten activities such as simple seasonal crafts, food preparation, stories, singing and games, get to know the school, meet other parents and learn about Steiner Waldorf Education.

== Management ==
Like most Steiner Waldorf schools, Wynstones adopts a co-operative approach to management.

Recently the school employed an Education Leader as part of the management structure. Broadly the roles of the various components are:

The Education Leader chairs the meetings of the College of Teachers, is responsible for Continuing Professional Development, INSET days, teacher appraisal, complaints & grievances, to lead and support the school's development and enhance the scope of education provided

The College of Teachers works as an advisory, reference group to the Education Leader

The Chair of Lower School (pupils 6 – 14): Management responsibility for the curriculum, teaching and learning, standards and attainment

The Chair of Upper School (pupils 14 – 18): Management responsibility for the curriculum, teaching and learning, standards and attainment

A Mandate system enlists the individual members to undertake an area of responsibility in the school

School Council – The Trustees

Wynstones is an educational charity and the independent trustees making up the School Council have final responsibility for the well-being of the school.

The School Council is ultimately responsible for all aspects of the school. The council's role is not day-to-day management of the school which is delegated to the Education Leader/Chair of college. Our overall commitment is that: 'The council, supporting the work of staff, the well-being of pupils and the interest of parents, holds itself accountable to the Association to see that Wynstones (a) achieves its desired aims, and (b) avoids unacceptable actions and situations.

== Notable alumni ==
- Peter Bridgmont (January 1929 - 24 June 2019), English actor, acting professor and author.
- Tim Noble, English artist, part of the collaborative duo Tim Noble and Sue Webster
- Mick Fleetwood, English drummer and co-founder of Fleetwood Mac
- Will Hazlewood, Church of England Bishop of Lewes since 2020.
- Seraphina Watts, daughter of Rolling Stones drummer Charlie Watts was a pupil at the school in the early 1980s.
