= Rudi Lissau =

Rudi Lissau (June 26, 1911 in Vienna – January 30, 2004 in Brookthorpe) was a Steiner school teacher, author, lecturer, and anthroposophist.

== Biography ==
Rudolf Lissau's parents were both of Jewish origin but had become students of Rudolf Steiner and founded, together with an uncle, the Viennese branch of the Theosophical Society as a forum for his work in Vienna. Steiner visited the family in their home from time to time. From the age of sixteen, Lissau began to study anthroposophy. From the time he completed school and began his studies at the university, he was a member of the Vienna Youth Group of gifted, young people, predominantly from assimilated Jewish backgrounds, who came together to study Steiner's works. The focal point of this group became, after he arrived in Vienna, Karl Koenig.

After obtaining his PhD, Lissau took a position teaching in a school for the blind. On the day Hitler's armies occupied Austria in 1938, Lissau, left Austria for Britain. One of the few who did not go with them was his sister. Lissau was the only one of the group who had made it to England who did not join with Koenig in the founding of Camphill, though he remained friends with all of them.

In London, Lissau began once again to work in a school for the blind until, like other enemy aliens, he was interned on the Isle of Man. His wife Hedda, also from Vienna, found him a post at the recently founded Wynstones School in Gloucestershire and so obtained his release. Lissau built up the high school at Wynstones and taught History, Geography, Latin, Greek, German and Music.

Lissau wrote several books, a large number of articles and a sought-after lecturer on Anthroposophy all over Europe, North America and New Zealand.

== Books ==
- Christian Morgensterns Form- und Sprachkunst (as Rudolf Lissau), Wien 1936
- The Challenge of the Will: Experiences with Young Children by Margaret Meyerkort and Rudi Lissau.
- Rudolf Steiner College Press; Revised edition (December 2002) ISBN 978-0945803416
- Rudolf Steiner: His Life, Work, Inner Path and Social Initiatives by Rudi Lissau. Hawthorn Press Ltd; 2nd edition (April 27, 2005) ISBN 978-1903458563
- Rudolf Steiner's Social Intentions by Rudi Lissau. New Economy Publications (December 1996) ISBN 978-0948229206
- Chosen Destiny – article by Rudi Lissau in Judaism and Anthroposophy Edited by M. Spiegler and F. Paddock, Anthroposophic Press (September 1, 2003) ISBN 978-0880105101
