= Howard Goorney =

British actor (1921–2007)

- Born: Howard Jacob Goorney; 11 May 1921; Manchester, England
- Died: 29 March 2007 (aged 85); Bath, Somerset, England
- Years active: 1952–2004
- Spouse: Stella Riley (before 2007)

Howard Jacob Goorney (11 May 1921 – 29 March 2007) was a British actor who starred in programmes including Only Fools and Horses.

He was a founding member of Joan Littlewood's Theatre Workshop and wrote The Theatre Workshop Story, about the company's early years, including its move to the Theatre Royal Stratford East.

His theatre roles include Bill Bryden's The Mysteries and Lark Rise to Candleford at the National Theatre in the 1970s and 1980s.

== Filmography ==
Year	Title	Role	Notes
1964	The Evil of Frankenstein	Drunk	
1965	The Hill	Trooper Walters	
1967	Berserk!	Emil	
1967	Bedazzled	Sloth	
1969	Take a Girl Like You	Labour Agent	
1969	Where's Jack?	Surgeon	
1970	You Can't Win 'Em All		
1971	The Blood on Satan's Claw	The Doctor	
1971	Fiddler on the Roof	Nachum the Beggar	
1971	The Corpse	Petrol Pump Attendant	
1972	Savage Messiah	Gendarme	Uncredited
1972	Innocent Bystanders	Zimmer	
1973	The Offence	Billy Lambert	
1976	To the Devil a Daughter	Critic	
1983	Fanny Hill	Mr. Croft	Uncredited
1984	The Last Days of Pompeii	Joseph	3 episodes
1987	Little Dorrit	Bob - the Turnkey	
1990	All Creatures Great and Small	Bill Shadwell	Series 7, episode 4: "A Friend For Life"
1991	Only Fools and Horses	Knock-Knock	Episode: "He Ain't Heavy, He's My Uncle"
2002	Ten Minutes Older	Old Man	(segment "About Time 2")
2002	Waking the Dead	Harold Newman	2 episodes
2003	Blackball	Reg Boyt	
