= Violetta Plincke =

Violetta Elsa Plincke (17 June 1883 in St Petersburg Russia – 7 January 1968 London UK) was a Waldorf teacher and lecturer on education who contributed much to the establishment of Steiner education in Britain.

== Early life ==
Violetta Plincke was born the daughter of an English architect at the imperial court of the Tzar and a German mother in St Petersburg. Fluent in three languages: Russian, German, and English, she initially studied History of Art and History at the University of St Petersburg. In 1912, she commenced her studies in Philosophy at the University of Freiburg im Breisgau. From a fellow student, Lutz Kricheldorff, who was the first actor to perform Ahriman in Rudolf Steiner’s Mystery Plays, she was introduced to the literature of Anthroposophy, about which she had previously heard in Russia and Finland. In 1913, Kricheldorff took her with him to the performances of the Mystery Plays in Munich and a short time later, the two got married. The marriage lasted but a few years, and she continued her studies in Berlin, where she was present at Rudolf Steiner’s public lectures in the “Architektenhaus” (GA 52 – 67) and left deeply impressed by the rhetorical skills of the lecturer, which inspired her for her later work as a lecturer in Britain.

== Career ==
During WW I she earned her living working in a children’s hospital. When Rudolf Meyer got her a job at the „Institut für Seeverkehr und Weltwirtschaft“ she moved to Kiel The first Anthroposophical Group in Kiel developed out of this initial circle of friends. Inspired by the “Hochschulkurse” (GA 322) in Dornach in 1920, Violetta asked Rudolf Steiner how she could best become engaged on behalf of Anthroposophy. He asked her to become Class 1 teacher for the new Waldorf School in Stuttgart. In 1923 she took on the task of introducing Steiner education into the new school of Margaret Cross in Kings Langley, England.

She remained in England, taking up an independent activity as travelling lecturer and counselor in Steiner education, which made her, as Cecil Harwood acknowledged in his obituary of her “one of the best known and loved members in Britain” Perhaps her primary engagement was with the Workers Educational Association (WEA), a worker’s educational community in the industrial centres of Britain, under whose auspices she could communicate culture and anthroposophy in her personal warm-hearted manner.

A motor accident brought her work to an end in March 1966 and she died at Epiphany in 1968.
