= Scarlet Harlets =

British women's theatre company

Poster for production of Appetite of the Heart, 1987. Photograph by Sarah Ainslie.

Scarlet Harlets was a women's theatre company based in London during the 1980s; it later changed its name to Scarlet Theatre. The company created physical theatre productions through a process of collaboration between the actors, the scriptwriter or translator, and the director.

== History ==
Scarlet Harlets was established in 1981, by Susan Paxton and Tessa Crockett. Shelley Graham joined in 1982 on Crockett's suggestion and Gaia Shaw joined as artistic designer and puppeteer. Chris Bowler later worked with the Scarlet Harlets as a director.

Scarlet Harlets operated as a collective of five members at most, working together intensively for months of rehearsal. The result, in the case of Toe on the Line at least, was "a show in which the bonding of the three actors to one another was extended into an intimate relationship with the audience".

We Who Were the Beautiful (after Auguste Rodin's sculpture Celle qui fut la belle Heaulmière) was the company's debut production in May 1982. The show examined parallels between the witch trials in the Middle Ages and the treatment of women in modern psychiatric hospitals. The production subsequently toured to several countries including Denmark, Germany, the Netherlands and Czechoslovakia. On the back of this show the company received funding from the Greater London Council.

== Productions ==
Subsequent shows included Out of Bounds in 1982/3, Broken Circle in 1984, Toe on the Line in 1985, 80 Days Soul in 1986, Appetite of the Heart in 1987, La Folie in 1988/9, (R) Age in 1990, Vows in 1991, Baby Baby in 1992, On Air in 1993, The Sisters in 1995, and Paper Walls also in 1995.

In 1997 Scarlet Theatre decided to include men in their show Princess Sharon at the Royal Festival Hall. The reason for this was described by Lizbeth Goodman and Jane de Gay as "to break out of the ghetto of lower-funded 'women's work'". The Independent commented that while "women's companies have all but faded from the scene ... [Princess Sharon] is a genuine departure: this time there are men on stage too." The newspaper suggested that this might encourage the Arts Council to fund such theatre companies rather better.

== Rehearsal process ==
The Scarlet Harlets collective evolved into Scarlet Theatre. The actress Kate Eaton records that she translated the Cuban playwright Virgilio Piñera's 1957 The Wedding (Spanish: La Boda) for Scarlet Theatre in 2003, collaborating with the actors and the artistic director Grainne Byrne, and enjoying "the actors' ability to literally think on their feet". The company's process for rehearsal included a week for research and development, during which the actors were allowed to improvise so as to identify characters and suitable story elements. The writer took this material and made it into a script over the next few months. The actors then worked with the script in their rehearsals. This process was modified somewhat to permit the adaptation of pre-existing scripts, whether in English or translated. It was adapted one step further to include the commissioning of fresh translations by people such as Eaton who would join in the collaboration as part of the creative team.

== Reception ==
Telory Williamson reviewed Scarlet Theatre's 1996 adaptation, The Sisters of Anton Chekhov's The Three Sisters for Theatre Journal. She described the director Katarzyna Deszcz's project of integrating the "actors, design, lights, music, and text as equal players in the stage space" as reflecting the teachings of the Polish director Tadeusz Kantor. Williamson argued that this "fits well with the Scarlet Theatre's process of generating material through improvisation and physical characterization." She praised Deszcz for combining excellent "physical theatre and psychological subject matter, employing both abstract gestures and a keen sense of physical clowning." Equally, she admired the production's "simple and clever reference to Chekhovian stagnation" through repetition of lines, mirroring the characters trapped in their unchanging domestic setting.

Maddy Costa, reviewing Scarlet Theatre's Love and Other Fairy Tales for The Guardian at the Edinburgh Festival of 2001, described it as "a magical piece, a playful, witty take on the Wife of Bath's Prologue and Tale that brings out all of Chaucer's modernity and bawdy humour." She considered the play perfect for the company, since it was "intelligent, physically demanding and deliciously romantic". The Evening Standard commented that while the production was at one level just "a delightful exercise in bawdiness and medieval caricature", at a deeper level it offered emotional insights into "unpalatable realities". The reviewer enjoyed the comedy on offer, and admired the tight theatrical pace of the directors Grainne Byrne and Katarzyna Deszcz.
