= Dante or Die Theatre =

British theatre company

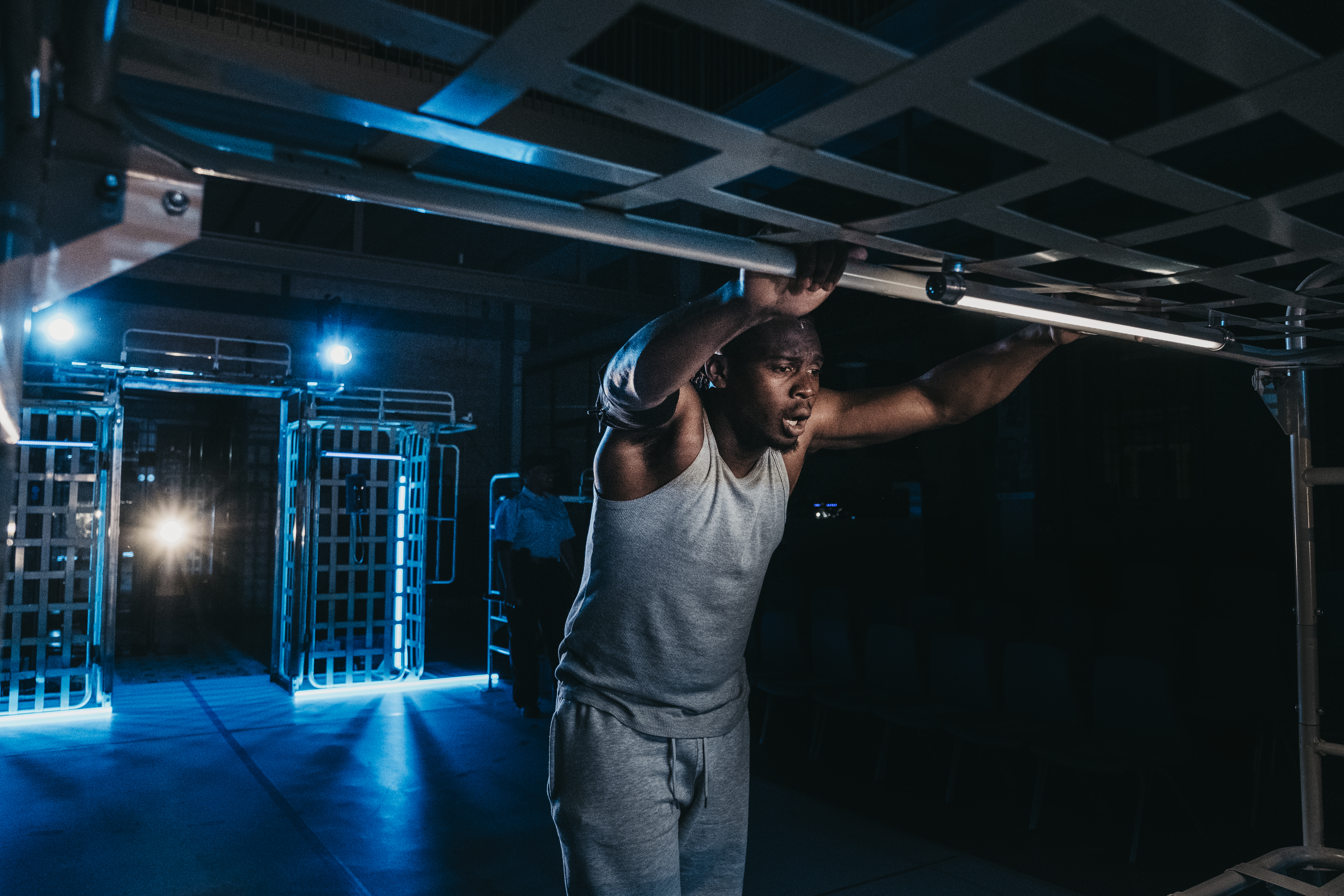
Production shot from Kiss Marry Kill at the Dockyard Church in Sheppey

Dante or Die Theatre is a British, theatre company specialising in creating and touring site-specific performances. Registered as a company limited by guarantee in 2006, the non-profit organisation creates performances in surprising everyday spaces such as hotels, leisure centres, cafés and storage facilities.

Co-Artistic Directors Daphna Attias and Terry O'Donovan conceive the company's productions that have toured across the UK and internationally.

== Background ==
Terry O’Donovan, from Limerick and Daphna Attias, from Tel Aviv formed Dante or Die after they both attended The Royal Central School of Speech and Drama's MA in Advanced Theatre Practice. The name 'Dante or Die' comes from the site where Terry & Daphna first made a site-specific performance together in the skate park of Kennington Park alongside Clare Parke-Davies and Anthea Neagle. The graffiti that has the words Dante or Die is still there today.

== Production history ==
- A Ballad of Thamesmead (2024), commissioned by Greenwich and Docklands International Festival this performance looked at the past, present and the future hopes of Thamesmead town and gently explored how the world around us impacts how we feel about our home. Live folk songs by Abbey Wood native Marie Bashiru along with Thamesmead Community Choir interwove with a soaring sound design that included local peoples’ voices, culminating in the clocktower illuminated like never before.
- Inside Odds On (2024), sees our award-winning film Odds On, and the subsequent outreach work delivered at gambling harm recovery centres during 2023, reimagined into a unique pop-up experience presented on high streets. Taking over empty high street shop units audiences can take a seat in a submerged betting shop to watch the solo-player interactive film that plunges you into the world of online gambling. The accompanying exhibition delves deep into the impact of gambling on people's lives and provides insight into the making of the film alongside resources and support information. To date the event has toured to Derby where it formed part of Departure Lounge Festival, Harlow and Rochdale, and it will open in Lincoln towards the end of October.
- Kiss Marry Kill (2024), inspired by a newspaper article about the first same-sex marriage in a UK prison, this production was brought to fruition after 5 years of research and development including delivering a workshop series with prisoners at HM Prison Swaleside and a 10-week Approaches to Theatre Making training programme for ex-prisoners. The production included an ensemble of 3 ex-prisoners, and music and live singing by singer/songwriter and rap artist Lady Lykez. Kiss Marry Kill premiered in Kent at the Dockyard Church in partnership with Ideas Test before touring to Stone Nest in London, The Concert Hall in Reading, St Peter's Hallé in Manchester and The Great Hospital in Norwich with partners South Street Arts, The Lowry, and York Theatre Royal. The production was nominated for 5 Offies and 2 of the cast have been nominated for Black British Theatre Awards.
- Odds On (2022), originally planned to be small site specific performances in betting shops examining the impact of gambling harm, the production was adapted in response to the pandemic and developed into an interactive online digital film. The interactive short film integrates audience interactivity & provides a simulated experience of gambling, allowing audience members to create their own avatar & spin an artificial slot machine whilst also seeing the protagonist's narrative as she plays & experiences the highs and lows of winning & losing and the impact that has on her life and those around her. A non-interactive version and an audio described version are also available. The film was created with groups of lived-experience participants from Gordon Moody residential centres, and is now being used by the NHS's National Problem Gambling Clinic to support recovery. The film did a digital tour to over 11 venues including: The Lowry, Norwich Theatre Royal, Attenborough Arts Centre, An Tobar & Mull Theatre, & Wales Millennium Centre.
- Skin Hunger (2021), responding to the pandemic three compelling monologues which explored the fundamental role that touch plays within our lives. Skin Hunger was a powerful live theatre experience set in a hidden chapel in London's West End which reflected on intimacy and connection. A film about the production – created with award-winning documentary filmmaker Pinny Grylls – is now hosted on Digital Theatre Plus.
- User Not Found (2018), a production about grief and the digital afterlife. Audiences enter a café and receive a set of headphones and a smartphone. Several tables away, a man is grappling in real time with something deeply private. Gradually, audiences bear digital witness, via smartphone and an intimate, funny live performance, to a stranger's profound experience. User Not Found immerses audiences in both the private and public, provoking surprising considerations of our online afterlife and shifting notions of connection and community. It has toured to over twenty venues across five countries in conjunction with world-class arts organisations such as Brooklyn Academy of Music, Print Screen Festival Israel and Battersea Arts Centre. In 2020, unable to tour due to the pandemic, we transferred User Not Found into a pioneering video podcast, which went on to have over 25k online views, in partnership with The Guardian.
- Take On Me (2016), a collaborative production, co-written by Andrew Muir is set in a local leisure centre after hours. This performance explores body image and provides a fly-on-the-wall perspective of an individual's journey to better themselves to a soundtrack of live acoustic renditions of 1980's hits. This production was the winner of Art Partnership Surrey & Farnham Maltings 'Not For The Likes Of Me' commission in 2015.
- Handle With Care (2016), a co-commission between The Lowry, Harlow Playhouse, South Street Arts Center, Reading and The Lighthouse (Poole). Staged in local self storage containers, this production explores how we accumulate objects and how they can create a sense of home throughout our lives. Production written by Chloe Moss and inspired by consultations with a University College London psychologist who specialised in memory.
- Clunk (2014), a production created for younger audiences, performed outdoors with instruments to explore originality of music.
- I Do (2013), a jigsaw production displayed across six hotel rooms depicting the moments before a wedding ceremony, co-written by Chloe Moss. Commissioned by Almeida Theatre and South Street Arts, Reading, this production has been performed in Hilton Hotels and Malmaison hotels.
- La Fille À La Mode (2011), premiered at the National Theatre as part of Watch This Space Festival. An exploration and celebration of the It Girl throughout the ages.
- Side Effects (2011), a unique collaboration with UCL School of Pharmacy to explore our intimate relationships with modern medicine. Inspired by Pharmacopoeia's "Cradle to Grave" exhibition (2005).
- Caliper Boy (2006), performed in a variety of disused buildings and theatres and inspired by graffiti artists in East London who created the character 'Caliper Boy'. This production explores otherness and our personal relationship with our place in society.

== Awards and nominations ==
- Kiss Marry Kill
  - Nominated for the 2025 Offie for Best Director (plays): Daphna Attias & Terry O'Donovan
  - Nominated for the 2025 Offie for Best Lead Performance in a Play: Dauda Ladejobi
  - Nominated for the 2025 Offie for Best Lead Performance in a Play: Graham Mackay-Bruce
  - Nominated for the 2025 Offie for Best Lighting Design: Joshua Gadsby
  - Nominated for the 2025 Offie for Best Set Design: Sophie Neil
  - Nominated for Black British Theatre Awards for Best Book & Lyrics: Lady Lykez
  - Nominated for Black British Theatre Awards for Best Supporting Male Actor in a Play: Frank Skully
- Odds On
  - Received The Digital Culture Awards for "Best Digital Content"
  - Received at the 2022 International Media Festival of Wales, "Best Interactive Film" award
  - Received at the Gully International Festival, "Best Experimental Short Film" award
  - (Terry O'Donovan & Daphna Attias) received the 2023 Scenesaver Best Director award
  - Received the Anthem Awards Silver Medal: Education, Arts & Culture - Digital & innovative Experiences
  - Nominated (shortlisted) for the 2021 Stage Awards for "Best Digital Project"
  - Received at the Munich New Wave Short Film Festival an Honourable Mention
- Skin Hunger
  - Received the 2022 Offie for "IDEA Performance Award"
- User Not Found Video Podcast
  - Nominated for the Prix Europa Award
  - Nominated (longlisted) for the Digital Culture Awards
  - Nominated (finalist) for the 2021 OnComm Award for Innovative & Interactive Performance
  - Winner of the Scenesaver Most Innovative Production Award
- User Not Found
  - Received the 2018 "The Wee Review Fringe Groundbreaker Award"
  - Received the 2018 Broadway World Best Theatre Show Award

== Collaborators ==
- Since 2006 Yaniv Fridel and OJ Shabi (also known as OJ & Fridel) of Soho Sonic Studios have worked as musical directors and composers on several productions including Odds On, Skin Hunger and User Not Found.
- The play User Not Found (2018) was written by theatre-maker Chris Goode in collaboration with Dante or Die. Following his death in 2021 and the emergence of multiple allegations of abuse, his authorship has been the subject of discussion regarding attribution and institutional responsibility in the UK theatre sector.

== See also ==
- Site-specific theatre
- Postmodern theatre
