= Oh, What a Lovely War! =

1963 musical by Joan Littlewood

- Original London Cast Recording
- Music: Various
- Lyrics: Various
- Book: Joan Littlewood and Theatre Workshop
- Basis: The Long Long Trail by Charles Chilton, The Donkeys by Alan Clark
- Productions: 1963 Stratford; 1963 West End; 1964 Broadway; 2002 West End revival 2010 UK Tour; 2014 Stratford revival Birmingham Theatre School- 2014

Oh, What a Lovely War! is an epic musical developed by Joan Littlewood and her ensemble at the Theatre Workshop in 1963. It is a satire on World War I, and by extension on war in general. The title is derived from the "somewhat satirical" music hall song "Oh! It's a Lovely War!", which is one of the major numbers in the production.

== Development ==
The idea for the production started on Armistice Day 1962 when Gerry Raffles heard the repeat of the second version of Charles Chilton's radio musical for the BBC Home Service, called The Long Long Trail about World War I. Written and produced by Chilton in memory of his father whose name was inscribed on the memorial at Arras, the piece was a radio documentary that used facts and statistics, juxtaposed with reminiscences and versions of songs of the time, as an ironic critique of the reality of the war. The songs were found in a book published in 1917 called Tommy's Tunes which had new lyrics written in the trenches to well-known songs of the era, many from hymns or from West End shows. Bud Flanagan provided the voice of the "ordinary soldier". The title came from the popular music hall song "There's a Long Long Trail A-Winding" published in 1913, mentioned in the introduction of Tommy's Tunes.

Raffles proposed the idea of using it as the basis of a production to his partner, Joan Littlewood, but she detested the idea, hating World War I, military uniforms, and everything they stood for. Gerry though, brought Chilton along to the theatre and they played through the songs. Eventually Littlewood considered it might work, but refused any military uniforms, deciding on pierrot costumes from Commedia dell'arte very early on as a "soft, fluffy entertainment mode" providing an ironic contrast to the tin hats which they also wore. Littlewood said, in 1995, that "Nobody died on my stage, they died in the film – that they ruined". She wanted audiences to leave the theatre laughing at the "vulgarity of war". The idea was to portray how groups of people could lose their sense of individuality by conforming to those of a higher authority, which Littlewood despised.

The Theatre Workshop developed productions through improvisation and initially the cast would learn the original script but then have that taken away and have to retell the story in their own words for performance. Each member of the Theatre Workshop was tasked with learning about a particular topic, such as Ypres or gas. As the production developed, it also used scenes from The Donkeys by military historian (and future Conservative politician) Alan Clark, initially without acknowledgement: Clark took Littlewood to court to get credited.

Some scenes in the production, notably one on the first time the trenches were gassed, were worked on for many days only for Littlewood to conclude they were too horrific for an audience, and delete them. This was another reason why uniforms were not worn in the production.

== Productions ==
The musical premiered at the Theatre Royal Stratford East on 19 March 1963 to rave audience reaction. Kenneth Tynan's review in The Observer was titled "Littlewood returns in triumph".

The official censor did not grant permission for a transfer to the West End until Princess Margaret attended a performance and commented to the Lord Chamberlain, Lord Cobbold, that "What you've said here tonight should have been said long ago, don't you agree, Lord Cobbold?"; at this point the transfer was more or less assured despite the objections of the family of Field Marshal Haig. It was an ensemble production featuring members of the theatre's regular company, which included Brian Murphy, Victor Spinetti, Glynn Edwards and Larry Dann, all of whom played several roles. In the original cast and subsequent Broadway theatre transfer, Haig was portrayed by George Sewell.

In 2023, Dann shared his memories of the production for his autobiography, Oh, What A Lovely Memoir. The sets were designed by John Bury. The production subsequently transferred to Wyndham's Theatre in June of the same year. The production was a surprise hit, and the musical was adapted by the BBC for radio several times.

The musical premiered in the United States on Broadway at the Broadhurst Theatre on 30 September 1964 and closed on 16 January 1965 after 125 performances. It was seen there by actor and former subaltern Basil Rathbone, who wrote to Charles Chilton that "we were duped, it was a disgusting war". Directed by Littlewood, the cast featured Spinetti, Sewell and Murphy, plus Barbara Windsor. It received four Tony Award nominations: for Best Musical, Best Direction, Best Featured Actress, and Best Featured Actor, winning Best Featured Actor. Spinetti also won the Theatre World Award.

The musical was staged by the Brunton Theatre Company in Musselburgh as part of its 1986/87 season of drama under the direction of Charles Nowosielski and Richard Cherns.

From September 2023 until May 2024, a 60th Anniversary production by Blackeyed Theatre toured the UK.

== Description ==
The original production was performed with the cast in pierrot costumes and metal helmets due to Littlewood's abhorrence of the colour khaki and anti-war feelings. Behind them projected slides (operated by projectionist Tom Carr) showed images from the war and a moving display (what Littlewood called her "electronic newspaper" from having seen one in East Berlin on a railway bridge) across the full stage width with statistics, such as "Sept 25 . . . Loos . . . British loss 8,236 men in 3 hours . . . German loss nil" and "Average life of a machine gunner under attack on the Western Front: 4 minutes".

Separating the performers from the actual events in this way would stop the audience collapsing in tears, and the production features such World War I-era songs as "It's a Long Way to Tipperary", "Pack up Your Troubles" and "Keep the Home Fires Burning". Harsh images of war and shocking statistics are projected onto the backdrop, providing a contrast with the comedy of the action taking place before it. The audience were also invited to join in with singing the songs.

The first act was designed to draw the audience in with the sentimentality of the songs, and the first explosion does not take place until the end of Act 1 during Goodbye...ee. Act 2 then brings the horror of war to the production.

== Title song ==
The song "Oh! It's a Lovely War" was written by J. P. Long and Maurice Scott in 1917 and was part of the repertoire of music hall star and male impersonator Ella Shields. The lyrics of the first verse and the chorus are as follows:

Up to your waist in water,
Up to your eyes in slush –
Using the kind of language,
That makes the sergeant blush;
Who wouldn't join the army?
That's what we all inquire,
Don't we pity the poor civilians sitting beside the fire.

Chorus:
Oh! Oh! Oh! it's a lovely war,
Who wouldn't be a soldier eh?
Oh! It's a shame to take the pay.
As soon as reveille is gone
We feel just as heavy as lead,
But we never get up till the sergeant brings
Our breakfast up to bed
Oh! Oh! Oh! it's a lovely war,
What do we want with eggs and ham
When we've got plum and apple jam?
Form fours! Right turn!
How shall we spend the money we earn?
Oh! Oh! Oh! it's a lovely war.

== Musical numbers ==
Sequence and casting based on the 1964 Broadway production

=== Act 1 ===
- "Row, Row, Row" (lyrics by William Jerome, music by James V. Monaco) – The Ensemble
- "We Don't Want to Lose You (Your King and Country Want You)" (music and lyrics by Paul Rubens) – The Ladies
- "Belgium Put the Kibosh on the Kaiser" (music and lyrics by Paddy Ellerton) – Valerie Walsh
- "Are We Downhearted" – The Men
- "It's a Long Way to Tipperary" (music and lyrics by Jack Judge and Harry Williams) – The Men
- "Hold Your Hand Out Naughty Boy" (music and lyrics by Murphy and David) – The Men
- "I'll Make a Man of You" (music and lyrics by Arthur Wimperis and Herman Finck) – Barbara Windsor
- "Pack Up Your Troubles in Your Old Kit-Bag" (lyrics by George Asaf) – The Men
- "Hitchykoo" (lyrics by L. Wolfe Gilbert, music by Lewis F. Muir and Maurice Abrahams) – Fanny Carby
- "Heilige Nacht" – Colin Kemball
- "Good-bye-ee!" (lyrics by R. P. Weston, music by Bert Lee) – Victor Spinetti

=== Act 2 ===
- "Oh What a Lovely War" – The Ensemble
- "Gassed Last Night" – The Men
- "Roses of Picardy" (music by Haydn Wood) – Linda Loftus and Ian Paterson
- "Hush Here Comes a Whizzbang" – The Men
- "There's a Long Long Trail" (lyrics by Stoddard King) – Ian Paterson
- "I Don't Want to Be a Soldier" – The Men
- "Kaiser Bill" – The Men
- "They Were Only Playing Leapfrog" – The Men
- "Old Soldiers Never Die" – Murray Melvin
- "Far Far from Wipers" (music and lyrics by Bingham and Greene) – Colin Kemball
- "If the Sergeant Steals Your Rum" – The Men
- "I Wore a Tunic (When You Wore a Tulip)" – Ian Paterson
- "Forward Joe Soap's Army" – The Men
- "Fred Karno's Army" – The Men
- "When This Lousy War is Over" – Colin Kembal
- "Wash Me in the Water" – The Men
- "I Want to Go Home" – The Men
- "The Bells Of Hell Go Ting-a-ling-a-ling" – The Men
- "Keep the Home Fires Burning" (lyrics by Lena Gulibert Ford, music by Ivor Novello) – Myvanwy Jenn
- "Sister Susie's Sewing Shirts" (lyrics by R. P. Weston, music by Herman Darewski) – Barbara Windsor
- "La Chanson de Craonne" – The Ensemble
- "Don't Want to Be a Soldier" – The Ensemble
- "And When They Ask Us" (music by Jerome Kern, parody lyric by Cole Porter, after original Kern song "They Didn't Believe Me") – The Ensemble

== Adaptation and in culture ==
Richard Attenborough's film adaptation was released in 1969, also as a musical, and won numerous awards. It was Attenborough's debut as a film director.

Several Australian World War I movies and miniseries (e.g. The Lighthorsemen and Gallipoli) have used these songs to give a stronger sense of period to them. The 1985 series Anzacs used "Oh, it's a lovely war" as one of the numbers while the credits rolled, had "I wore a tunic" performed as part of an entertainment piece while the characters were on easy duties, used "Keep the home fires burning" as another credit number, and featured "The Bells of Hell" sung by Tony Bonner and Andrew Clarke.

== Awards and nominations ==
=== Original Broadway production ===
Year	Award	Category	Nominee	Result
1965	Tony Award	Best Musical		Nominated
1965	Tony Award	Best Performance by a Featured Actor in a Musical	Victor Spinetti	Won
1965	Tony Award	Best Performance by a Featured Actress in a Musical	Barbara Windsor	Nominated
1965	Tony Award	Best Direction of a Musical	Joan Littlewood	Nominated

=== 2002 London revival ===
Year	Award	Category	Nominee	Result
2003	Laurence Olivier Award	Best Musical Revival		Nominated

=== 2010 UK tour ===
Year	Award	Category	Nominee	Result
2010	TMA Awards	Best Performance in a Musical: Ensemble		Nominated

=== 2014 Stratford revival ===
Year	Award	Category	Nominee	Result
2014	Laurence Olivier Award	Outstanding Achievement in an Affiliate Theatre		Nominated

== See also ==
- List of plays with anti-war themes
- List of anti-war songs

== General and cited references ==
- Arthur, Max. 2001. When This Bloody War Is Over: Soldiers' Songs from the First World War. London: Piatkus. ISBN 0-7499-2252-4.
- Banham, Martin, ed. 1998. The Cambridge Guide to Theatre. Cambridge: Cambridge University Press. ISBN 0-521-43437-8.
- Brockett, Oscar G. and Franklin J. Hildy. 2003. History of the Theatre. Ninth edition, International edition. Boston: Allyn and Bacon. ISBN 0-205-41050-2.
- Eyre, Richard and Nicholas Wright. 2000. Changing Stages: A View of British Theatre in the Twentieth Century. London: Bloomsbury. ISBN 0-7475-4789-0.
- Milling, Jane and Peter Thomson, eds. 2004. The Cambridge History of British Theatre. Cambridge: Cambridge University Press. 397–401. ISBN 0-521-82790-6.
