= George Abbott Way =

Section of West 45th Street in Manhattan, New York

Coordinates: 40°45′31″N 73°59′13.5″W

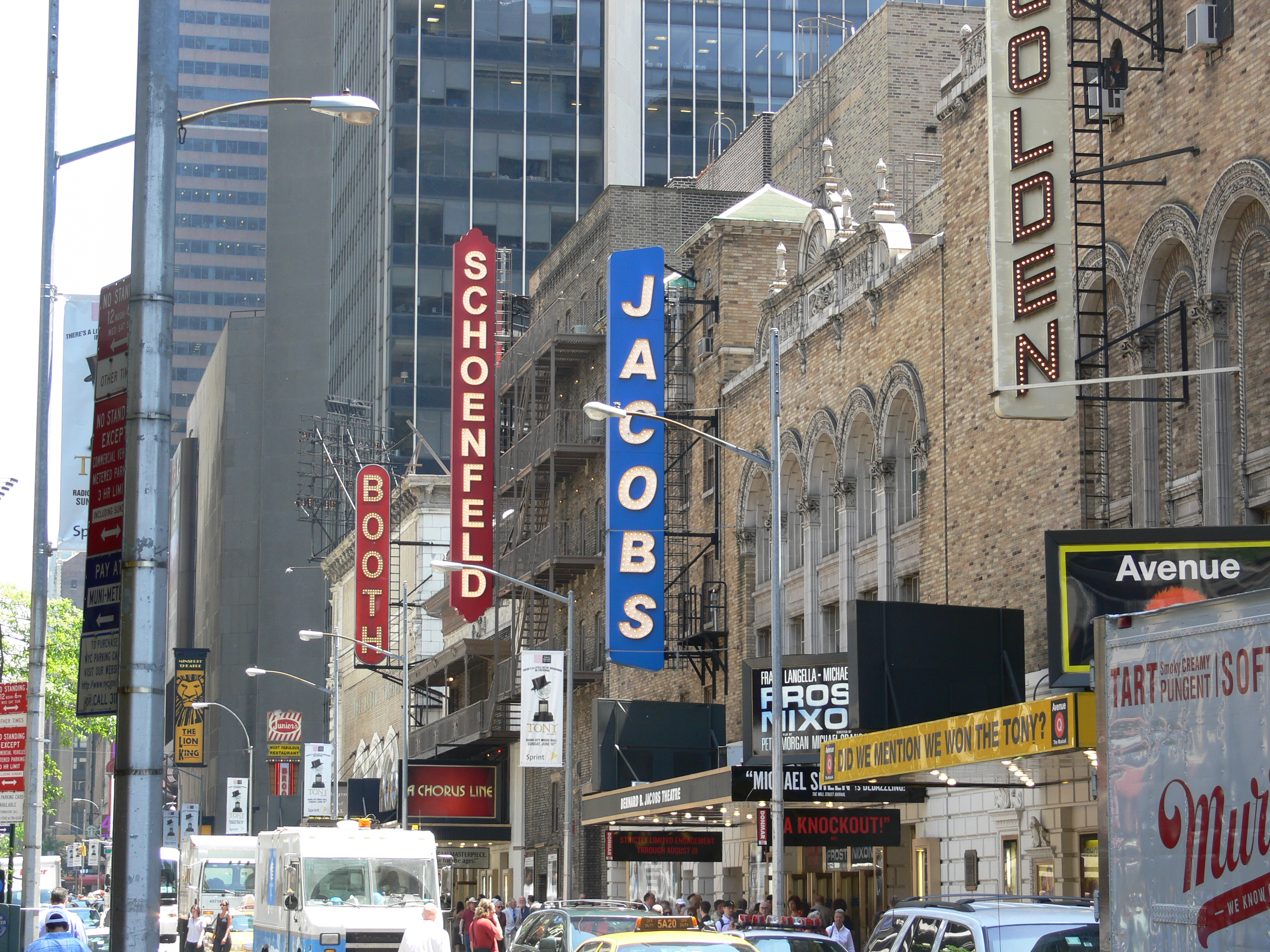
Booth, Schoenfeld, Jacobs and Golden theatres on George Abbott Way, 2007

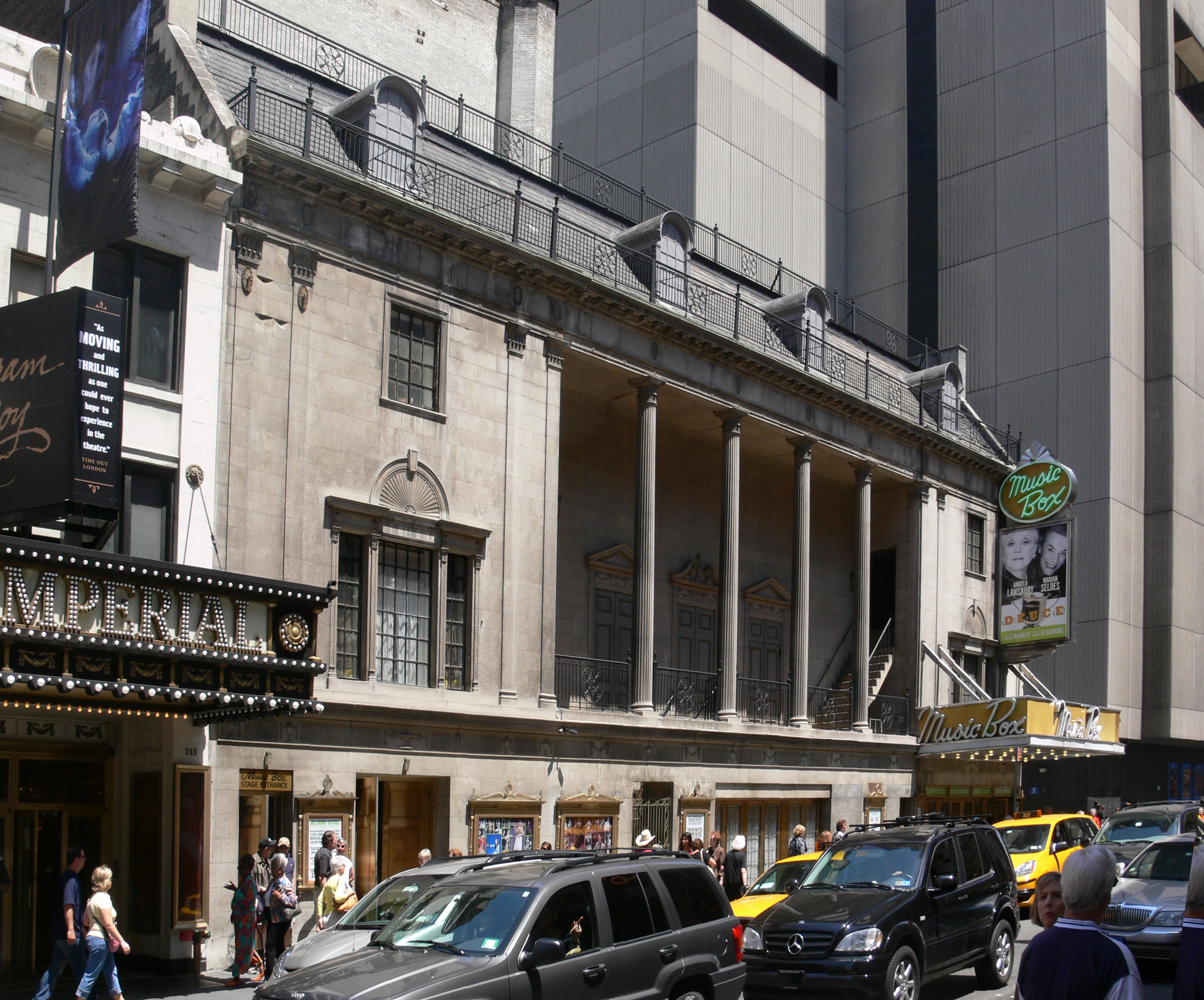
Imperial and Music Box theatres on George Abbott Way, 2007

George Abbott Way is a section of West 45th Street west of Times Square between Seventh and Eighth Avenues in New York City, named for Broadway producer and director George Abbott. It is just east of Restaurant Row.

== Notable buildings ==
The area home to a large concentration of Broadway theatres, many belonging to The Shubert Organization, including:

- 222 West 45th Booth Theatre
- 236 West 45th Gerald Schoenfeld Theatre
- 239 West 45th Music Box Theatre
- 242 West 45th Bernard B. Jacobs Theatre
- 249 West 45th Imperial Theatre
- 252 West 45th John Golden Theatre

The street is also occupied by large buildings on three corners:

- New York Marriott Marquis hotel (northeast corner; houses the Marquis Theatre)
- One Astor Plaza (southeast corner; houses the Minskoff Theatre)
- Row NYC Hotel (southwest corner)
