= Bernard B. Jacobs Theatre =

Broadway theater in Manhattan, New York

- Royale Theatre
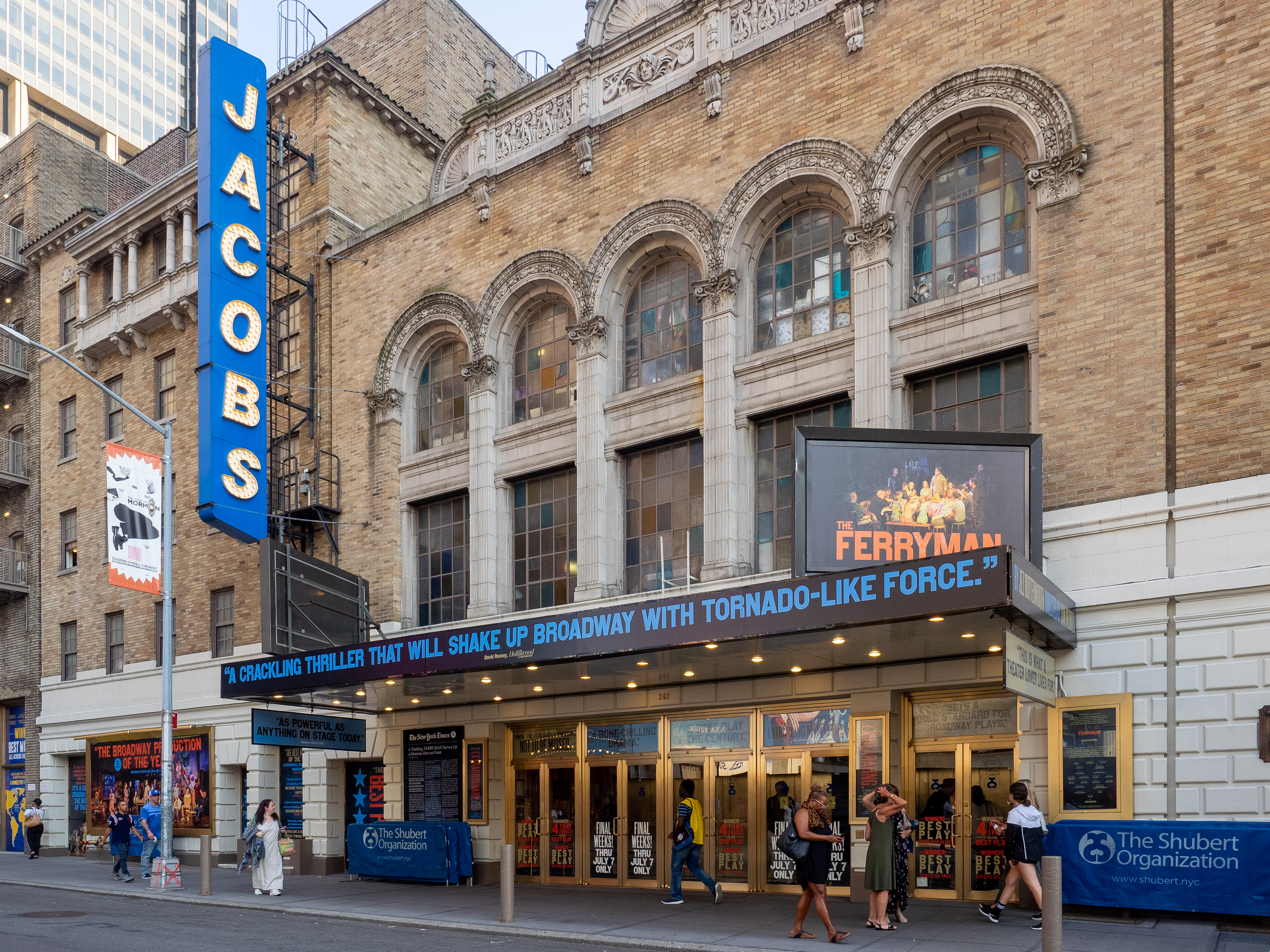
- Showing The Ferryman, 2019
- Interactive map of Bernard B. Jacobs Theatre
- Address: 242 West 45th Street (George Abbott Way); Manhattan, New York; United States
- Coordinates: 40°45′31″N 73°59′16″W
- Owner: Jacobs Theatre LLC
- Operator: The Shubert Organization
- Capacity: 1,092
- Type: Broadway
- Production: The Outsiders
- Public transit: Subway: Times Square–42nd Street/Port Authority Bus Terminal

Construction
- Opened: January 11, 1927 (99 years ago)
- Architect: Herbert J. Krapp

Website
- shubert.nyc/theatres/bernard-b-jacobs

New York City Landmark
- Designated: December 15, 1987
- Reference no.: 1372
- Designated entity: Facade

New York City Landmark
- Designated: December 15, 1987
- Reference no.: 1373
- Designated entity: Auditorium interior

The Bernard B. Jacobs Theatre (formerly the Royale Theatre and the John Golden Theatre) is a Broadway theater at 242 West 45th Street (George Abbott Way) in the Theater District of Midtown Manhattan in New York City, New York, U.S. Opened in 1927, the theater was designed by Herbert J. Krapp in a Spanish style and was built for real-estate developer Irwin S. Chanin. It has 1,100 seats across two levels and is operated by The Shubert Organization. Both the facade and the auditorium interior are New York City landmarks.

The facade is designed in a Spanish style with golden brick, terracotta, and stone and is divided into two sections. The western portion of the facade contains the theater's entrance, with five double-height arched windows and a curved pediment above. The eastern portion is the stage house and is topped by a loggia. The auditorium contains Spanish-style detailing, a large balcony, and an expansive vaulted ceiling. The auditorium's interior features murals by Willy Pogany as well as several box seats.

The Royale, Majestic, and Masque (now John Golden) theaters, along with the Lincoln Hotel, were all developed by the Chanin brothers and designed by Krapp as part of a theater/hotel complex. The Royale was the first of the three theaters to be completed, opening on January 11, 1927. The Shubert family took over the Royale in 1930 but subsequently went into receivership, and producer John Golden leased the theater in 1932. Golden renamed the theater after himself in 1934, but the Shuberts took over in 1936 and leased the theater to CBS Radio. The Royale was restored as a legitimate theater under its original name in 1940. The theatre was renamed in 2005 after Bernard B. Jacobs (1916–1996), former president of the Shubert Organization.

== Site ==
The Bernard B. Jacobs Theatre is at 242 West 45th Street, on the south side between Eighth Avenue and Broadway, near Times Square in the Theater District of Midtown Manhattan in New York City, New York, U.S. The nearly rectangular land lot covers 9,275 ft^{2} (861.7 m^{2}), with a frontage of 88.17 ft (26.87 m) on 44th Street and a depth of 100.42 ft (31 m). The Golden Theatre shares the city block with the Row NYC Hotel to the west. It adjoins six other theaters: the Gerald Schoenfeld and Booth to the east, the Broadhurst and Shubert to the southeast, the Majestic to the south, and the Golden to the west. Other nearby structures include the Music Box Theatre and Imperial Theatre to the north; the New York Marriott Marquis to the northeast; One Astor Plaza to the east; and Sardi's restaurant, the Hayes Theater, and the St. James Theatre one block south.

The Jacobs is part of the largest concentration of Broadway theaters on a single block. The adjoining block of 45th Street is also known as George Abbott Way, and foot traffic on the street increases box-office totals for the theaters there. The Majestic, Masque (Golden), and Royale (Jacobs) theaters and the Lincoln Hotel (Row NYC Hotel) had all been developed concurrently. The site of all four buildings had previously occupied by twenty brownstone residences. The site was part of the Astor family estate from 1803 to 1922, when it was sold to Henry Claman. The plots collectively measured 200 feet (61 m) wide along Eighth Avenue, 240 feet (73 m) along 44th Street, and 250 feet (76 m) along 45th Street.

== Design ==
The Bernard B. Jacobs Theatre, originally the Royale Theatre, was designed by Herbert J. Krapp in a Spanish style and was constructed from 1926 to 1927 for the Chanin brothers. It was part of an entertainment complex along with the Lincoln Hotel and the Majestic and Masque theaters, which were also designed by Krapp in a Spanish style. The Royale was designed to be the medium-sized theater of the complex, with about 1,200 seats initially. The Chanin Realty and Construction Company constructed all four structures. The Jacobs is operated by the Shubert Organization.

=== Facade ===
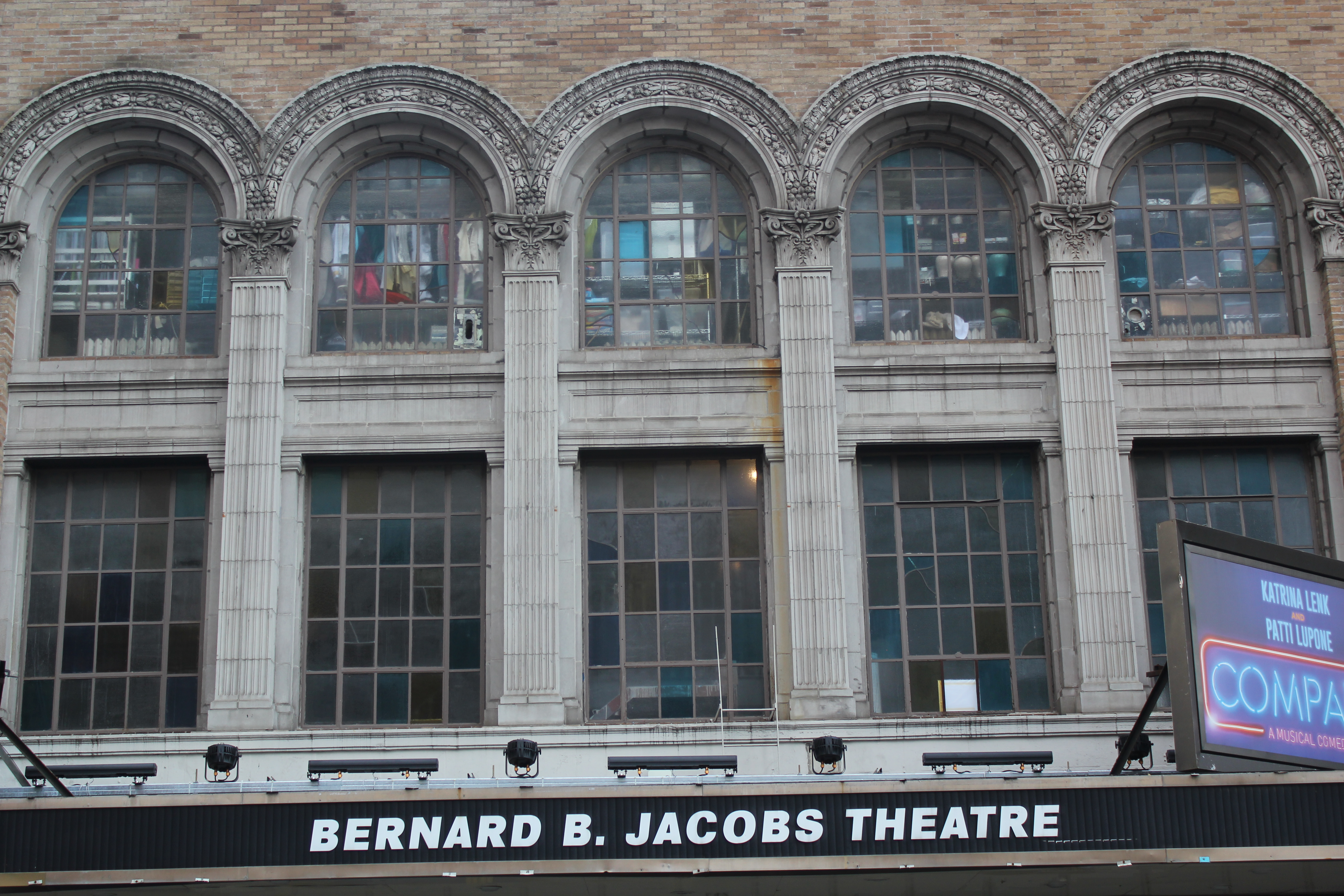
Archway detail above the auditorium entrance

The facade contains two sections. The western section is wider and is symmetrical, containing the auditorium entrance. The eastern section, which contains the stage house, is narrower and taller than the western section. In both sections, the ground floor is clad in rusticated blocks of terracotta above a granite water table. At ground level, the auditorium entrance includes five pairs of glass and aluminum doors, which lead to the ticket office and auditorium. There are also rectangular aluminum-framed sign boards beside the openings. The entrance is topped by a marquee. Four sets of aluminum doors lead from the stage house portion of the facade. A terracotta cornice runs above the base. The stage door is at 270 West 45th Street (next to the Golden Theatre) and is shared with the Majestic and Golden theaters.

The upper stories contain gold-colored, bonded Roman brick. The brick facade was designed to relate to the adjacent theaters and hotel. On the upper stories, the auditorium section has a set of five arches on the second and third stories. The arches rise above terracotta piers that contain Corinthian-style capitals. Each arch contains iron-framed sash windows with multiple panes, separated by horizontal transom bars. A similar, narrower arcade exists on the neighboring Golden Theatre. A sign with the theater's name is placed between the auditorium and stage sections. The parapet of the auditorium facade contains a terracotta coping. Above the center portion of the facade, there is a rounded pediment with finials and an ornamental lunette.

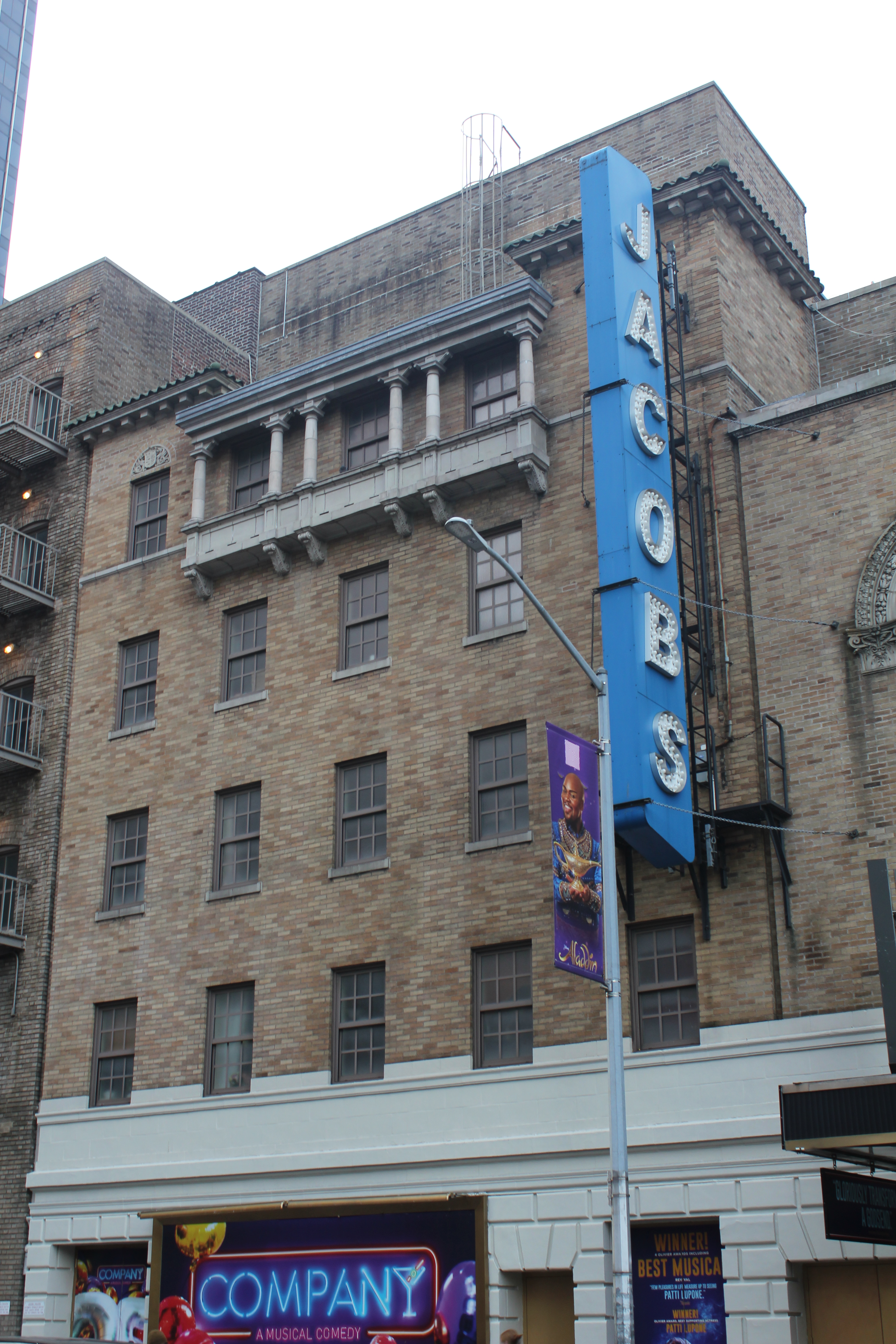
Stage house

The stage house has five sash windows on each of the second through fifth stories. These windows contain sills made of terracotta. At the fifth story, the three center windows are placed within a loggia, which in turn is placed on brackets. The loggia has paired columns with decorative capitals, which support a Spanish tile roof. There is a pyramidal tile roof above the stage house. The Jacobs's loggia complements a similar one on the Golden Theatre.

=== Auditorium ===
The Jacobs's interior was designed with a red, orange, and gold color scheme. The layout was part of an effort by Irwin Chanin, one of the developers, to "democratize" the seating arrangement of the theater. The Jacobs was designed with a single balcony rather than the typical two, since Chanin had perceived the second balcony to be distant. The Chanin brothers wanted the three theaters' interior designs to be distinct while still adhering to a Spanish motif, in the belief that beautiful and comfortable theaters would be able to compete against other performing-arts venues. Roman Melzer was credited for the overall design, while Willy Pogany painted murals and Joseph Dujat created plasterwork. By the 2010s, the Jacobs was designed with a red and gray color palette.

The auditorium has an orchestra level, one balcony, boxes, and a stage behind the proscenium arch. The auditorium's width is greater than its depth, and the space is designed with plaster decorations in high relief. According to the Shubert Organization, the auditorium has 1,092 seats, while according to The Broadway League, there are 1,078 seats. The physical seats are divided into 636 seats in the orchestra, 168 at the front of the balcony, 252 at the rear of the balcony, and 16 in the boxes. There are 20 standing-only spots. Below the orchestra are restrooms and drinking fountains. The Jacobs and the neighboring Schoenfeld are two of the most desired theaters among producers because of their good sightlines from the seating areas.

==== Seating areas ====
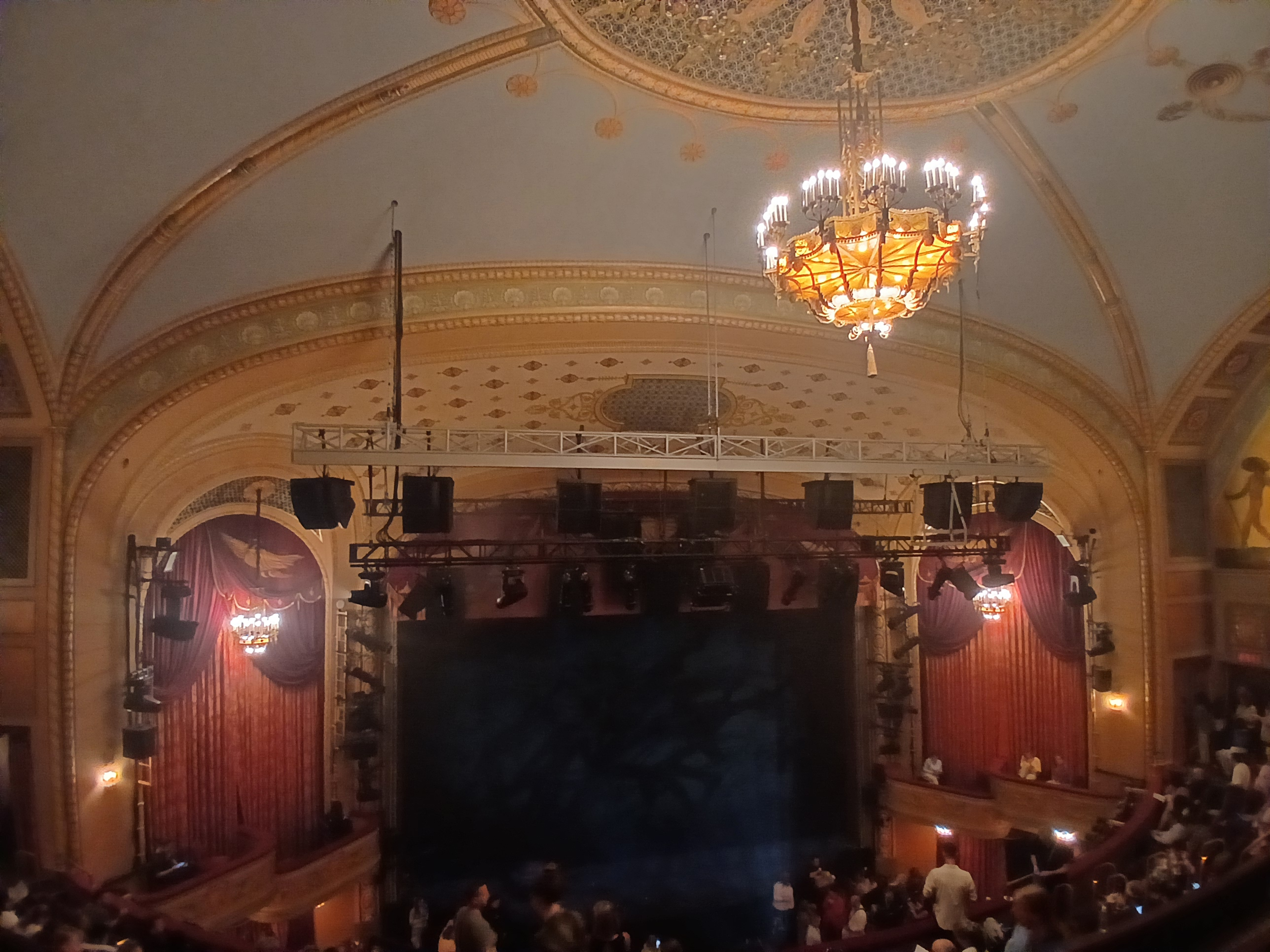
View of the proscenium arch

The rear of the orchestra contains a promenade with two columns supporting the balcony level. The orchestra floor is raked. The orchestra and its promenade contain walls with paneled baseboards, above which are rough stucco blocks. The side walls contain doors, above which are exit signs within bracketed panels. The rearmost row has a standing rail behind it. Two staircases lead between the orchestra and the balcony. These staircases have metal railings and elaborate balustrades. In front of the orchestra level is an orchestra pit, which is placed below the stage. The orchestra level is wheelchair-accessible but there are no elevators to the balcony. The balcony level is divided into front and rear sections by an aisle halfway across the depth. The walls consist of paneled stucco blocks. Above the wall is a frieze with rosettes, which forms the wall's cornice. Light fixtures and square panels with arabesques are placed at the front of the balcony's soffit, or underside. Behind this, the center of the soffit is decorated with a medallion containing a light fixture and acanthus-leaf motifs. The outer portions of the soffit are divided into rhombus-shaped panels, which contain latticework and arabesques surrounded by acanthus-leaf and rope moldings. In front of the balcony are moldings of swags and rosettes. The soffit has been modified with the installation of air-conditioning grilles, while lights have been installed in front of the balcony.

On either side of the stage is an elliptically arched wall section with two boxes at the balcony level. The front box on either side is lower than the rear box. Each wall section is surrounded by a rope molding. In front of each box is a railing with shield motifs; the center motif is flanked by griffins. The underside of each box is decorated with a medallion containing a light fixture, as well as acanthus-leaf motifs. The coved ceilings above the boxes contain Spanish-inspired brass chandeliers.

==== Other design features ====
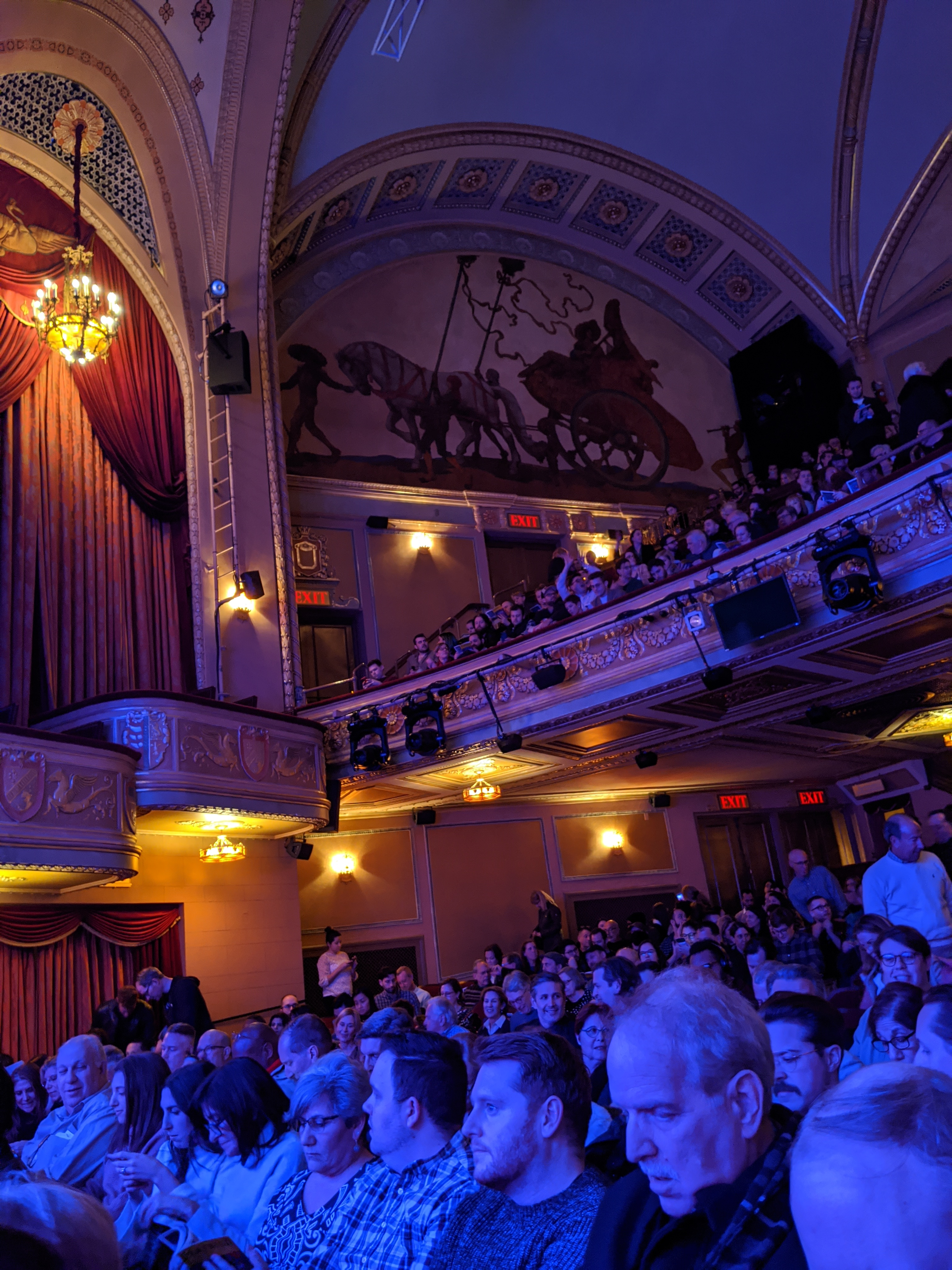
Interior of the auditorium, looking sideways toward the north wall. The boxes are at left, while the balcony is at right. Half of the mural sequence Lovers of Spain is in the arch section above the balcony.

Next to the boxes is an elliptical proscenium arch. The archway is surrounded by rope moldings, above which is a wide band, consisting of four-part leaves surrounded by a guilloche motif. The proscenium measures about 24 ft (7.3 m) high and 40 ft (12 m) wide. A sounding board curves onto the ceiling above the proscenium arch. The sounding board has a large decorated latticework panel in the center, which is surrounded by a molding that depicts overlapping leaves. The rest of the sounding board was originally decorated with Spanish-style motifs and is surrounded by moldings on all sides. The depth of the auditorium to the proscenium is 26 ft 4 in (8.03 m), while the depth to the front of the stage is 30 ft 1 in (9.17 m).

The ceiling consists of a groin vault that extends over the balcony. The vault is surrounded by a molding with laurel leaves. The ceiling is divided into ribs, containing laurel-leaf and talon moldings. The center of the ceiling contains a latticework grille with arabesques, marking the convergence of the ribs. In addition, there are two arches along the walls on either side of the vault; they contain a set of murals by Willy Pogany, entitled Lovers of Spain. These arches each depict a woman in a procession of musicians. The arches are surrounded by molded acanthus leaves and shells, and there are square panels with rosettes on the arches' outer reveals. According to a contemporary account, the arches measured 45 by 15 ft (13.7 by 4.6 m) across.

== History ==
Times Square became the epicenter for large-scale theater productions between 1900 and the Great Depression. During the 1900s and 1910s, many theaters in Midtown Manhattan were developed by the Shubert brothers, one of the major theatrical syndicates of the time. The Chanin brothers developed another grouping of theaters in the mid-1920s. Though the Chanins largely specialized in real estate rather than theaters, Irwin Chanin had become interested in theater when he was an impoverished student at the Cooper Union. He subsequently recalled that he had been "humiliated" by having to use a separate door whenever he bought cheap seats in an upper balcony level. By October 1926, the Chanins had decided to construct and operate a theatrical franchise "in New York and half a dozen other large cities in the United States". Herbert Krapp had already designed the 46th Street, Biltmore, and Mansfield theaters for the Chanins in 1925 and 1926.

=== Development and early years ===
==== Chanin operation ====
The Chanin brothers had acquired the Klaman site in May 1925. The Chanins planned to build a hotel on Eighth Avenue and three theaters on the side streets. In March 1926, Krapp filed plans with the New York City Department of Buildings for the hotel and theaters, which were projected to cost $4.5 million. Local news media reported that there would be a large theater on 44th Street and a medium-sized theater and a small theater on 45th Street. (Note: Billboard magazine reported that the large and medium theaters would be on 44th Street, while the small theater would be on 45th Street.) The brownstones on the site were razed starting in May, and the site was cleared by the next month. That July, the Chanin brothers received a $7.5 million loan for the four developments from S. W. Straus & Co. Irwin Chanin launched a competition the same month, asking the public to suggest names for the three theaters. The names of the three theaters were announced in December 1926. The large theater became the Majestic; the mid-sized theater, the Royale; and the small theater, the Masque. The following month, the Chanins gave A. L. Erlanger exclusive control over bookings at the three new theaters and their five existing houses.

The Royale Theatre was the first of the three theaters to open, (Note: The Masque opened on February 24, 1927, and the Majestic opened on March 28. The Chanin project was completed in January 1928 with the opening of the Lincoln Hotel.) showing the play Piggy on January 11, 1927. The opening of the Majestic, Masque, and Royale signified the westward extension of the traditional Broadway theater district, as well as an expansion of the Chanins' theatrical developments. Each of the Chanin theaters was intended for a different purpose: the 1,800-seat Majestic for "revues and light operas", the 1,200-seat Royale for "musical comedies", and the 800-seat Masque for "intimate" plays. By developing a small, medium, and large theater concurrently, the Chanins were able to lower their development costs. Burns Mantle wrote for the New York Daily News that the Royale had "a handsome auditorium with a Willy Pogany interior, well proportioned stage, and the established atmosphere of a hospitable and well-run theatre". Piggy (renamed mid-run to I Told You So) had a weak script, but comedian Sam Bernard carried the show for 79 performances.

The Royale next hosted Judy with Queenie Smith. This was followed by the short-running Oh, Ernest!, though the Chanins unsuccessfully tried to prevent the producers from relocating prematurely. The Black revue Rang Tang also played at the Royale in 1927, as did three Gilbert and Sullivan works: The Mikado, Iolanthe, and The Pirates of Penzance. The Royale's productions in 1928 included The Madcap, as well as Sh! The Octopus, its first straight play. Later that year, the Royale had its first major hit, the Mae West play Diamond Lil. It was followed in 1929 by the flop Woof, Woof, then by the moderately successful comedy Kibitzer. In July 1929, the Shubert brothers bought the Chanin brothers' half-ownership stakes in the Majestic, Masque, and Royale theaters for a combined $1.8 million. In exchange, the Shuberts sold a parcel of land on the Upper West Side to the Chanins, who bought several adjacent lots and developed the Century apartment building there.

==== Great Depression and ownership changes ====
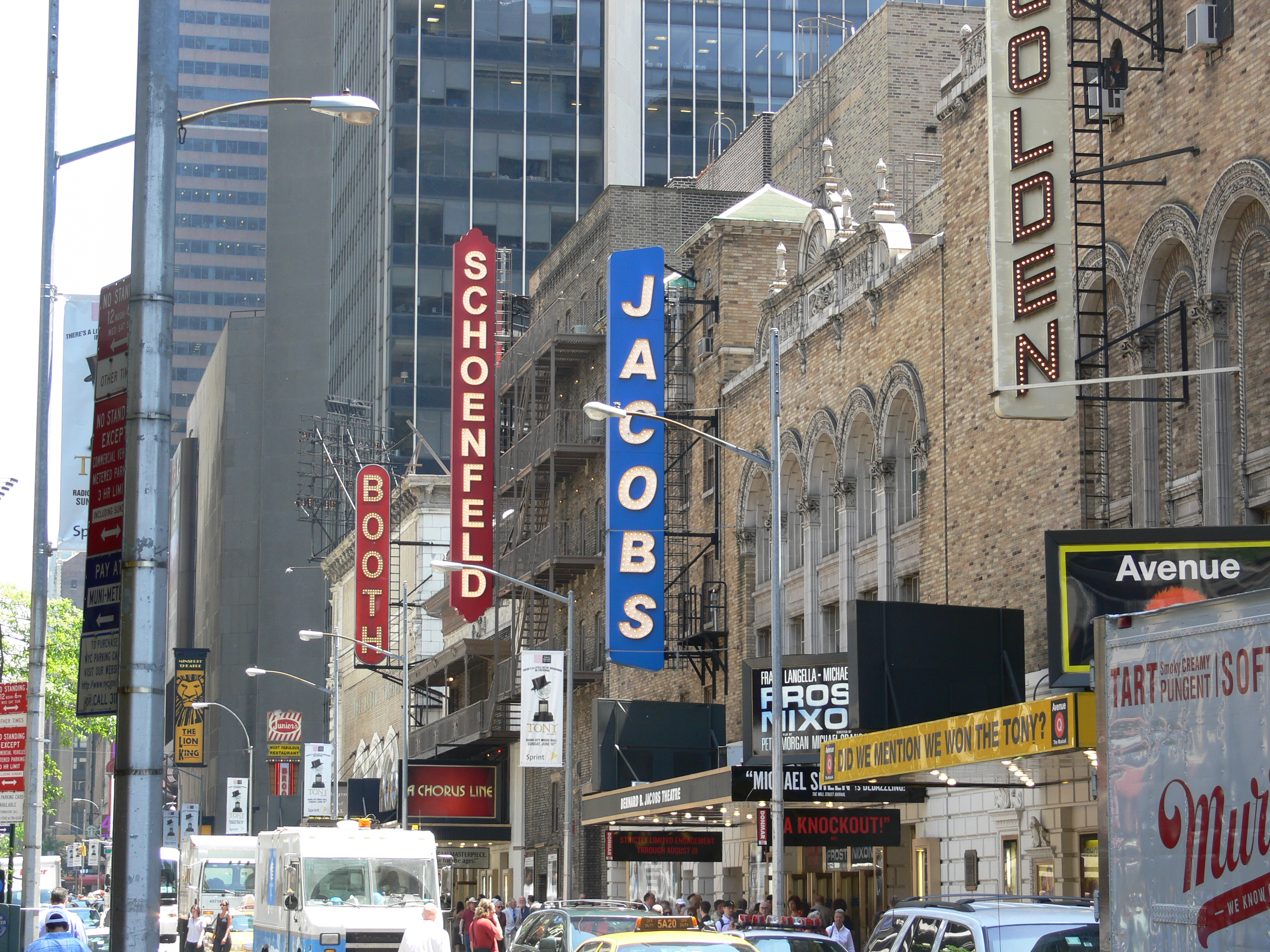
The Booth, Schoenfeld (Plymouth), Jacobs (Royale), and Golden (Masque) theaters from left to right

The Shuberts obtained the exclusive rights to operate the Royale in 1930. Under Shubert management, the Royale hosted Second Little Show in 1930, which was followed by Lew Leslie's Blackbirds and Stepping Sisters. Another Mae West play, Constant Sinner, was presented at the Royale in 1931, along with numerous unsuccessful productions. After West unsuccessfully tried to show a revival of Macbeth, the Royale hosted the Chicago Shakespeare Theater for two weeks in late 1931. By then, the Shuberts were in receivership and were forced to give up the Royale, though they kept the Majestic and Masque. In July 1932, producer John Golden granted the right to lease the Royale for 21 months, despite objections from Lee Shubert. That November, Golden officially signed a 21-month lease with the theater's receiver. At the time, Golden had recently lost the right to operate his eponymous theater on 58th Street.

The Royale hosted Golden's comedy When Ladies Meet in late 1932, and the Theatre Guild next hosted two productions: Both Your Houses (1933) and They Shall Not Die (1934). Otherwise, the Royale's productions during this time were largely flops. After the Royale hosted the comedy Every Thursday, Golden renewed his lease in September 1934 and renamed the Royale for himself. (Note: The "John Golden Theatre" name had first been given to a theater on 58th Street, which opened in 1926.) The first productions at the Royale, after it was renamed the John Golden Theatre, included Small Miracle and Rain from Heaven. The Irish group Abbey Theatre Players started hosting repertory productions in November 1934, changing the shows every week. This was followed in 1935 by The Bishop Misbehaves and A Touch of Brimstone. Afterward, the Golden (Royale) hosted several short-lived productions in 1936, among them Three Wise Fools, Ghosts, and Double Dummy.

The Broadway theater industry declined during the Great Depression, and the Majestic, Masque, and Golden (Royale) were auctioned in November 1936 to satisfy a $2 million mortgage against the theaters. A representative of the Shubert family bought the rights to operate the theaters for $700,000, but the Bankers Securities Corporation retained a half interest. John Golden, undeterred by the auction proceeding, moved his production to the Masque and renamed that theater after himself. The Shuberts leased the former Royale to CBS Radio the following month, and CBS started operating the studio in January 1937 as CBS Radio Theatre No. 1. At the time, CBS had converted several theaters around Times Square into broadcast studios. The studio closed in May 1940 due to a lack of programming, and the theater reverted to the Shuberts. The Magoro Operating Corporation, on behalf of the Shuberts, took over the Royale in October 1940 after CBS's lease ended, and the theater assumed its previous name.

=== Shubert operation ===
==== 1940s to 1970s ====
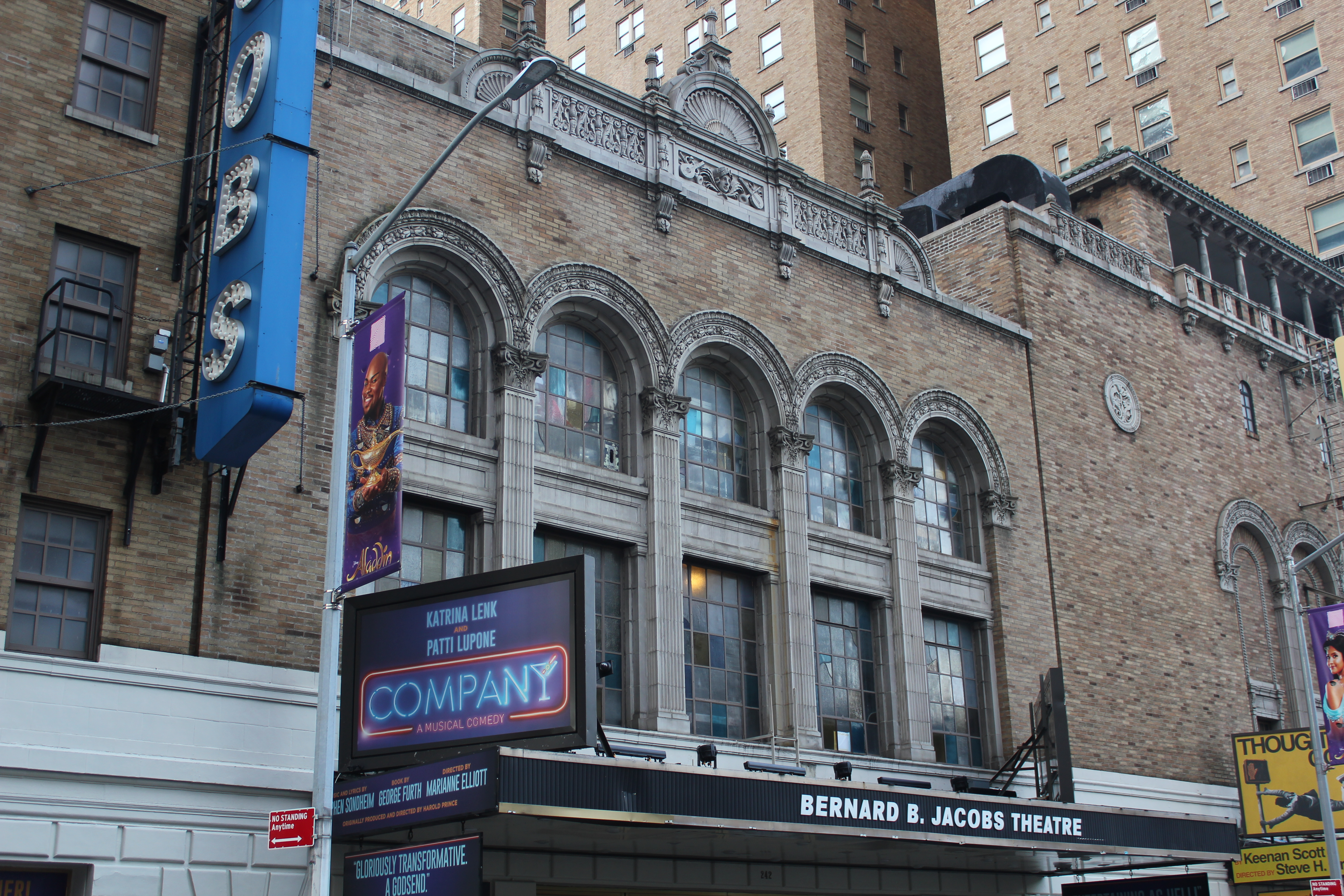
Seen from the east

The Royale Theatre reopened on October 21, 1940, with Du Barry Was a Lady. The Royale subsequently hosted several productions relocated from other theaters, including Flight to the West and The Corn Is Green in 1941. Some of the subsequent productions were hits with several hundred performances, including Counsellor-at-Law in 1942, as well as Ramshackle Inn with ZaSu Pitts; School for Brides with Roscoe Karns; and Catherine Was Great with Mae West in 1944. Less successful were the 1945 productions of Good Night, Ladies and Strange Fruit, which both ran for less than a hundred performances before ending. In addition, the Shubert brothers bought the Majestic, John Golden (Masque), and Royale theaters from the Bankers Securities Corporation in 1945, giving the family full ownership of these theaters.

The productions in 1946 included The Magnificent Yankee, featuring Louis Calhern and Dorothy Gish; The Glass Menagerie; The Front Page; and Fatal Weakness, featuring Ina Claire. Subsequently, The Importance of Being Earnest, Love for Love, and Medea were all produced in 1947. The comedy Light Up the Sky ran over 200 performances in 1948, and The Madwoman of Chaillot played the Royale the next year. The following decade began with productions of The Devil's Disciple and The Lady's Not for Burning in 1950, as well as a relocated production of Darkness at Noon in 1951. Following that was Borscht Capades and a series of short-lived productions. The Royale then hosted New Faces of 1952, which turned out to be the last popular Broadway revue for several years due to the growing popularity of television.

The Immoralist played at the Royale in 1954, as did The Boy Friend, the latter of which featured Julie Andrews's Broadway debut. The same year saw the shortest production at the Royale on record: a single performance of The Starcross Story, which had premiered just before The Immortalist. In 1955, the Royale featured The Matchmaker, which was adapted from a flop but had 486 performances. Other popular productions during the decade were The Tunnel of Love in 1957 and The Entertainer in 1958. Following a screening of the film Gigi in May 1958, the Royale again hosted theatrical productions that November with La Plume de Ma Tante, which ran over 800 performances.

In the early 1960s, the Royale hosted numerous productions including Becket in 1960, From the Second City in 1961, The Night of the Iguana in 1961, and Lord Pengo in 1962. The Royale additionally presented a four-week engagement of the Karmon Israeli Dancers in May 1963. Following were The Rehearsal in 1963 and The Chinese Prime Minister, The Subject Was Roses, and Hughie in 1964. For much of the rest of the decade, the Royale was taken up by Cactus Flower, which premiered in 1965 and ran for 1,234 performances. Man in the Glass Booth, which premiered in 1968, was the Royale's last major production of the 1960s. The Royale hosted Child's Play in 1970 and Moonchildren in 1972. From 1972 to 1980, the Royale hosted the musical Grease. The production became the longest-running show on Broadway, and the set was peeling by the time Grease stopped playing at the Royale.

==== 1980s and 1990s ====
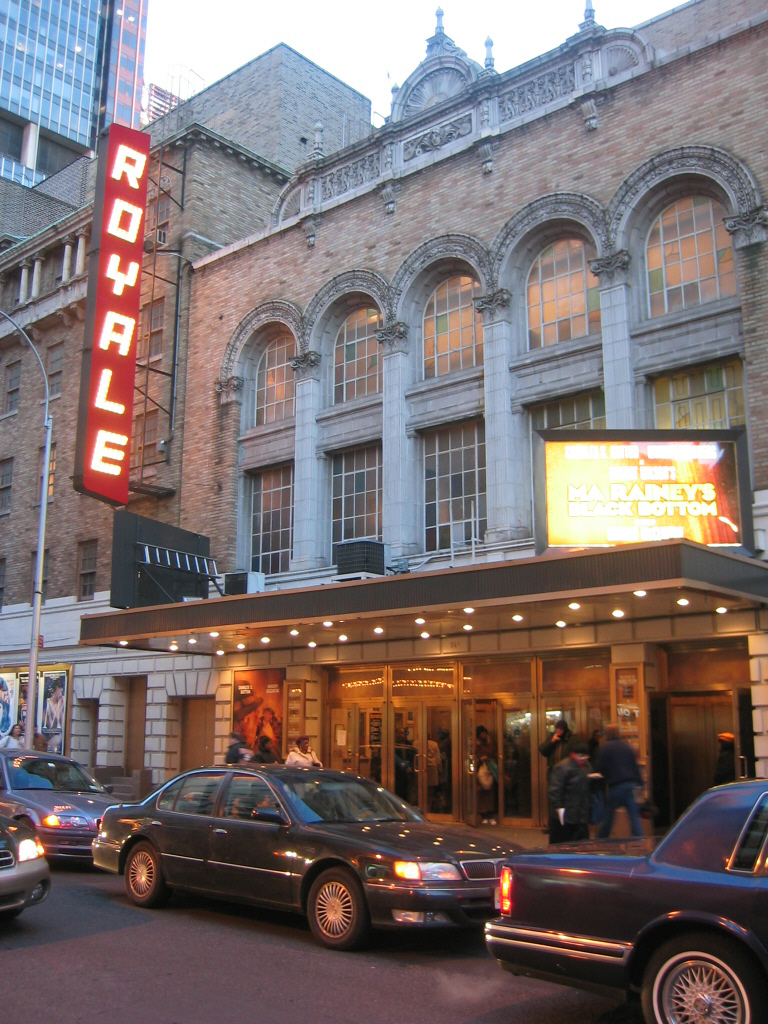
The Royale Theatre, showing Ma Rainey's Black Bottom, 2003

In February 1980, Whose Life is it Anyway? opened at the Royale, with Mary Tyler Moore playing what had previously been a male starring role. This was followed the same year by A Day in Hollywood / A Night in the Ukraine, a double bill with 588 performances. The Royale then hosted Duet for One with Anne Bancroft and Max von Sydow for a month, followed by Joseph and the Amazing Technicolor Dreamcoat, which also ran for over a year. Besides Broadway productions, the Royale also held college commencements.

In the mid-1980s, the Royale had some brief runs, including The Human Comedy in 1984 and Home Front and Pack of Lies in 1985. The Royale next presented the two-act show Song and Dance in 1985, which ran for 474 performances. This was followed by a four-performance revival of the play Broadway in 1987 to celebrate George Abbott's 100th birthday. Other flops included Roza in 1987 and the New York Shakespeare Festival's off-Broadway production Serious Money in 1988. The decade ended with two hits: Speed-the-Plow, which opened in 1988 and played 287 performances, and Lend Me a Tenor, which ran for over a year following its opening in 1989. During the 1980s, the Shuberts renovated the Royale as part of a restoration program for their Broadway theaters.

The New York City Landmarks Preservation Commission (LPC) had started considering protecting the Royale as a landmark in 1982, with discussions continuing over the next several years. The LPC designated the Royale's facade and interior as a landmark in December 1987. This was part of the LPC's wide-ranging effort in 1987 to grant landmark status to Broadway theaters. The New York City Board of Estimate ratified the designations in March 1988. The Shuberts, the Nederlanders, and Jujamcyn collectively sued the LPC in June 1988 to overturn the landmark designations of 22 theaters, including the Royale, on the merit that the designations severely limited the extent to which the theaters could be modified. The lawsuit was escalated to the New York Supreme Court and the Supreme Court of the United States, but these designations were ultimately upheld in 1992.

The first hit at the Royale in the 1990s was the 1992 play Conversations with My Father, which ran for over a year. London's Royal National Theatre presented An Inspector Calls in 1994, which ran 454 performances. The National Actors Theatre was the next occupant of the Royale, presenting a revival of Inherit the Wind. The Royal National Theatre also produced Skylight at the Royale in 1996, and Triumph of Love premiered in 1997. The play Art opened in 1998, running through the following year with 600 performances. The Royale's final production of the 1990s was a revival of The Price in 1999.

==== 2000s to present ====
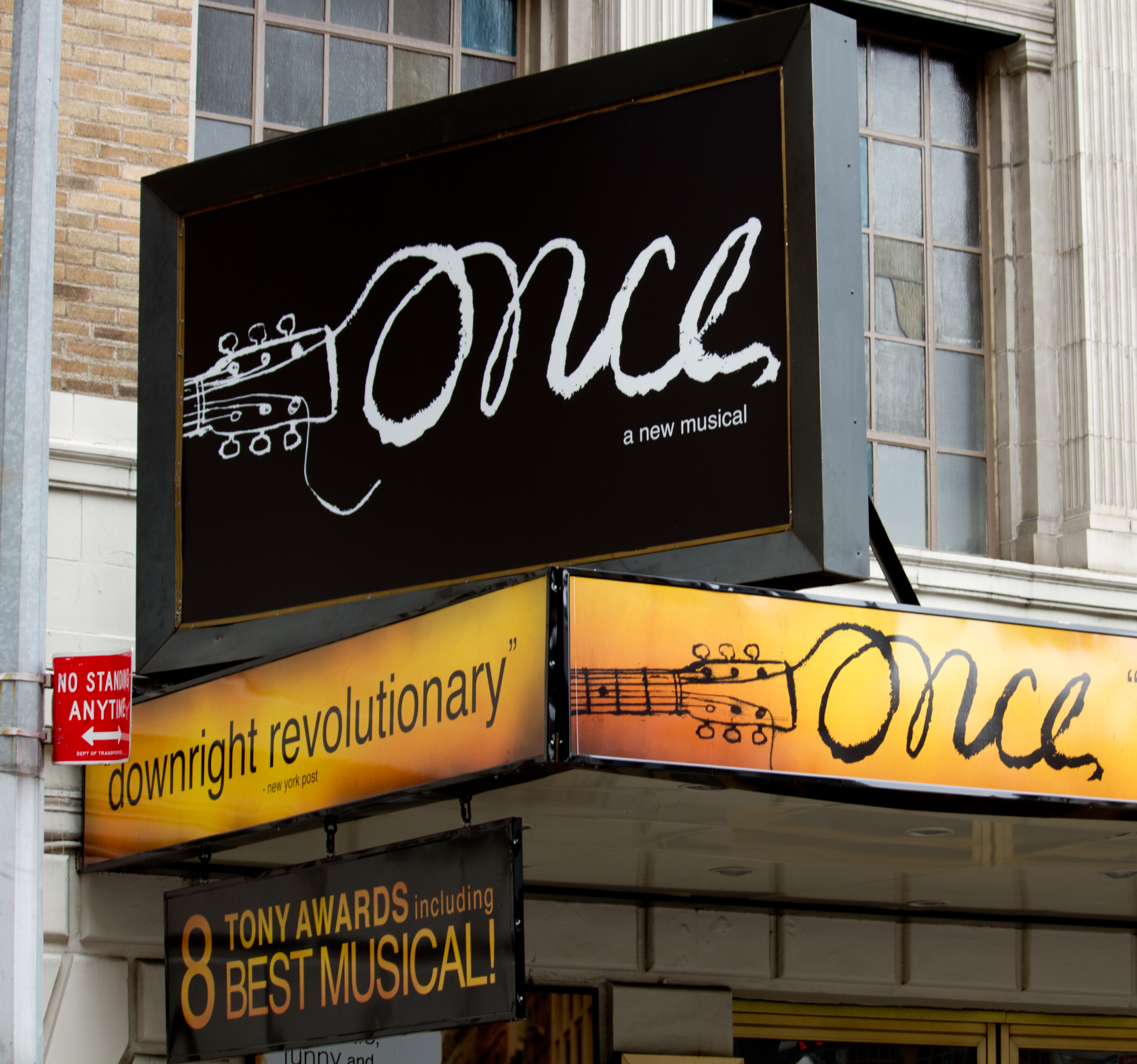
The marquee of the Jacobs during the run of Once (2012)

The Royale hosted a revival of the play Copenhagen in 2000, which ran 326 performances. The theater then staged One Flew Over the Cuckoo's Nest and John Leguizamo's solo show Sexaholix in 2001, as well as The Elephant Man and Jackie Mason's solo comedy Prune Danish the next year. As part of a settlement with the United States Department of Justice in 2003, the Shuberts agreed to improve disabled access at their 16 landmarked Broadway theaters, including the Royale. Also in 2003, the Royale hosted the short-lived revivals Ma Rainey's Black Bottom and "Master Harold"...and the Boys, as well as the more successful Anna in the Tropics. The next year, the Royale held the productions A Raisin in the Sun and 'night, Mother.

In September 2004, the Shubert Organization's board of directors voted to rename the Royale for its longtime president Bernard B. Jacobs (1916–1996), as well as the neighboring Plymouth for then-current president Gerald Schoenfeld. The two theaters were officially renamed with a marquee replacement ceremony on May 9, 2005. While Jacobs's family was "thrilled", the renaming was controversial among producers and theatrical fans, despite the longstanding tradition of renaming Broadway houses after their producers. The play Glengarry Glen Ross opened just before the renaming and had 137 performances. This was followed in 2006 by the short-running drama Three Days of Rain and Martin Short's biographical revue Fame Becomes Me; the Jacobs also hosted a memorial for Lloyd Richards the same year. Further productions of the late 2000s included Frost/Nixon and Rock 'n' Roll in 2007; The Country Girl and 13 in 2008; and God of Carnage in 2009.

The Jacobs hosted Bloody Bloody Andrew Jackson in 2010, as well as That Championship Season and The Mountaintop in 2011. The musical Once opened at the Jacobs in 2012 and was a hit, running for nearly three years. Once was followed by the comedy It's Only a Play in 2015. The Jacobs hosted two musicals over the following two years: The Color Purple (2015) and Bandstand (2017). Following were the dramas The Iceman Cometh and The Ferryman in 2018, as well as Betrayal in 2019. The theater closed on March 12, 2020, due to the COVID-19 pandemic. It reopened on November 15, 2021, with previews of Company, which ran until July 2022. Following the closure of Company, the theater hosted Almost Famous from November 2022 to January 2023. New York City Center's production of Parade transferred to the Jacobs in March 2023 and ran until August. This was followed in April 2024 by La Jolla Playhouse's transfer of the musical The Outsiders, which has occupied the theater since.

== Notable productions ==
Productions are listed by the year of their first performance. This list only includes Broadway shows; it does not include films screened at the theater, nor does it include shows that were taped there.

=== Royale Theatre/John Golden Theatre ===
Notable productions at the theater
Opening year	Name	Refs.
1927	Rang Tang	
1927	The Mikado	
1927	Iolanthe	
1927	The Pirates of Penzance	
1928	Diamond Lil	
1930	Second Little Show	
1930	Lew Leslie's Blackbirds	
1931	Dracula	
1931	Hamlet	(Note: Hamlet, Julius Caesar, and The Merchant of Venice played in repertory.)
1931	The Merchant of Venice	
1931	Julius Caesar	
1933	Both Your Houses	
1934	Small Miracle	
1936	Mulatto	
1936	Star Spangled	
1936	Ghosts	
1940	Du Barry Was a Lady	
1941	The Corn Is Green	
1942	The Flowers of Virtue	
1943	The World's Full of Girls	
1944	Ramshackle Inn	
1944	Catherine Was Great	
1945	Strange Fruit	
1946	The Glass Menagerie	
1946	The Front Page	
1947	The Importance of Being Earnest	
1947	Love for Love	
1947	Medea	
1949	The Madwoman of Chaillot	
1950	The Devil's Disciple	
1950	Affairs of State	
1950	The Lady's Not for Burning	
1952	One Bright Day	
1952	New Faces of 1952	
1954	The Immoralist	
1954	Sabrina Fair	
1954	The Boy Friend	
1955	The Matchmaker	
1957	Miss Isobel	
1958	The Entertainer	
1958	La Plume de Ma Tante	
1960	Becket	
1961	The Night of the Iguana	
1964	The Subject Was Roses	
1964	A Severed Head	
1964	Hughie	
1965	All in Good Time	
1965	And Things That Go Bump in the Night	
1965	The Owl and the Pussycat	
1965	Cactus Flower	
1970	Child's Play	
1971	How the Other Half Loves	
1971	The Incomparable Max	
1972	Moonchildren	
1972	Jacques Brel is Alive and Well and Living in Paris	
1972	Grease	
1980	Whose Life is it Anyway?	
1980	A Day in Hollywood / A Night in the Ukraine	
1982	Joseph and the Amazing Technicolor Dreamcoat	
1983	You Can't Take It with You	
1984	The Human Comedy	
1985	Pack of Lies	
1985	Song and Dance	
1987	Sweet Sue	
1987	Broadway	
1987	Roza	
1988	Serious Money	
1988	Speed-the-Plow	
1989	Lend Me a Tenor	
1992	Conversations with My Father	
1993	The Kentucky Cycle	
1994	An Inspector Calls	
1996	Inherit the Wind	
1996	Skylight	
1997	Triumph of Love	
1998	'Art'	
1999	The Price	
2000	Copenhagen	
2001	One Flew Over the Cuckoo's Nest	
2002	The Elephant Man	
2003	Ma Rainey's Black Bottom	
2003	"Master Harold"...and the Boys	
2003	Anna in the Tropics	
2004	A Raisin in the Sun	
2004	'night, Mother	
2005	Glengarry Glen Ross	

=== Bernard B. Jacobs Theatre ===
Notable productions at the theater
Opening year	Name	Refs.
2006	Three Days of Rain	
2006	Martin Short: Fame Becomes Me	
2007	Frost/Nixon	
2007	Rock 'n' Roll	
2008	The Country Girl	
2008	13	
2009	God of Carnage	
2010	Bloody Bloody Andrew Jackson	
2011	That Championship Season	
2011	The Mountaintop	
2012	Once	
2015	It's Only a Play	
2015	The Color Purple	
2017	Bandstand	
2018	The Iceman Cometh	
2018	The Ferryman	
2019	Betrayal	
2021	Company	
2022	Almost Famous	
2023	Parade	
2024	The Outsiders	

== Box office record ==
Once previously achieved the box office record for the Bernard B. Jacobs Theatre, grossing $1,447,598 over nine performances for the week ending December 30, 2012. This record was broken by Parade, which grossed $1,814,013 for the week ending August 6, 2023.

== See also ==
- List of Broadway theatres
- List of New York City Designated Landmarks in Manhattan from 14th to 59th Streets
