= Row NYC Hotel =

Hotel in Manhattan, New York

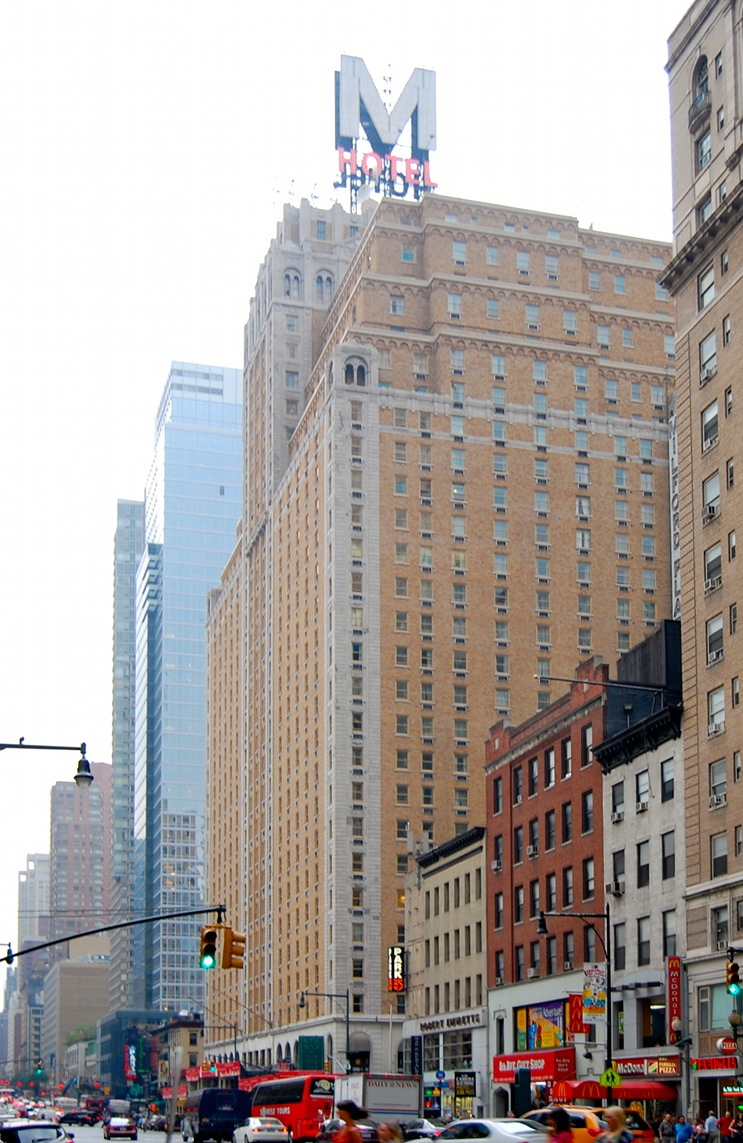
- The hotel in 2008 with the neon "M" on top, since removed
- Former names: Lincoln Hotel, Manhattan Hotel, Royal Manhattan Hotel, Milford Plaza Hotel

General information
- Location: 700 8th Avenue; Manhattan, New York; United States
- Coordinates: 40.7587°N 73.9883°W
- Opening: February 1, 1928
- Owner: Rockpoint Group
- Operator: Highgate Holdings

Technical details
- Floor count: 27

Design and construction
- Developer: Irwin S. Chanin

Other information
- Number of rooms: 1,331
- Number of restaurants: 1

Website
- www.rownyc.com

Row NYC Hotel is a hotel at 700 Eighth Avenue, between 44th and 45th Streets, in the Midtown Manhattan neighborhood of New York City. The hotel is 27 stories tall with 1,331 rooms. Designed by Schwartz & Gross, with Herbert J. Krapp as consulting architect, it was developed by brothers Henry and Irwin Chanin and opened on February 1, 1928, as the Hotel Lincoln. The hotel largely retains its original brick-and-terracotta facade. The interior spaces, which originally included a lobby and various restaurants on the first three stories, have been redesigned substantially over the years.

The Chanin brothers had acquired the site in May 1925 and developed it along with the neighboring John Golden, Bernard B. Jacobs, and Majestic theaters. The Chanins resold the hotel in 1927 to Irving I. Lewine and the United Cigar Stores Company, but the brothers continued to lease the hotel until 1931, when United Cigars acquired their lease. Maria Kramer bought the hotel in 1938 before reselling it in 1956 to Webb and Knapp, operated by real estate developer William Zeckendorf, which extensively renovated the hotel and renamed it the Hotel Manhattan. British firm Grand Metropolitan Inc. bought the hotel in 1969, and it operated as the Royal Manhattan until it was closed in 1974. The Milstein family purchased the hotel in 1978, and it reopened in 1980 as the Milford Plaza Hotel. Rockpoint Group and hotel operator Highgate Holdings bought the hotel in 2011 and renamed it the Row NYC in 2014. Following an influx of asylum seekers to New York City, the hotel began housing asylum seekers in 2023. The hotel reopened to guests in May 2026.

== Site ==
The Row NYC Hotel is on 700 Eighth Avenue, on the eastern sidewalk between 44th and 45th Streets, in the Theater District of Midtown Manhattan in New York City. The land lot is rectangular and covers 19,982 square feet (1,856.4 m^{2}), with a frontage of approximately 200 feet (61 m) on Eighth Avenue and 100 feet (30 m) on either side street. The Row NYC adjoins seven Broadway theaters clockwise from north: the John Golden, Bernard B. Jacobs, Gerald Schoenfeld, Booth, Shubert, Broadhurst, and Majestic. Other nearby structures include the Al Hirschfeld Theatre to the west, Music Box Theatre and Imperial Theatre to the northeast, and the Hayes Theater and the St. James Theatre to the southeast.

The surrounding area is part of the largest concentration of Broadway theaters on a single block. The adjacent block of 45th Street is also known as George Abbott Way, and foot traffic on the street increases box-office totals for the theaters there. The hotel is also approximately 100 yards (91 m) west of Shubert Alley, which separates the seven adjacent theaters from One Astor Plaza and the Minskoff Theatre. The Majestic, Masque (Golden), and Royale (Jacobs) theaters and the Lincoln Hotel (Row NYC Hotel) had all been developed concurrently. The site of all four buildings had previously been occupied by twenty brownstone residences. The site was part of the Astor family estate from 1803 to 1922, when it was sold to Henry Claman. The plots collectively measured 200 feet (61 m) wide along Eighth Avenue, 240 feet (73 m) along 44th Street, and 250 feet (76 m) along 45th Street.

== Architecture ==
The Lincoln Hotel was designed by Schwartz & Gross, with Herbert J. Krapp as consulting architect. It was constructed by the Chanin Construction Company, headed by Irwin Chanin. The hotel is 27 stories high, although it was originally described as being 30 stories high. Its facade was variously described as being designed in the Byzantine or Italianate style. The ground floor is clad in rusticated blocks of terracotta, and the upper stories contain gold-colored, bonded Roman brick. The brick facade was designed to relate to the adjacent theaters. In contrast to the neighboring theaters, the Row NYC's facade is sparsely detailed.

=== Public rooms ===
==== Lobby and restaurants ====
The hotel's public rooms were originally designed in a red, green, and blue color scheme, with carvings and chandeliers that evoked the designs of skyscrapers. There was originally 25,000 square feet (2,300 m^{2}) of commercial space, consisting of 16 showrooms and storefronts. The first story contained the lobby, shops, and restaurants. Irwin Chanin had planned to furnish the lobby in the Louis XIV style, but Chanin changed his plans because he believed that the flappers of the 1920s would look out of place in the hotel. At the 45th Street end of the lobby was a lounge with a red, blue, green, and silver ceiling, adjacent to which was a library with 3,000 volumes. The restaurants consisted of a 50-seat basement café, a 250-seat grill room, and a 400-seat main dining room. The grill room had wooden beams on its ceiling and was designed in an English style. The second floor was supposed to be a ballroom and banking hall; as built, it had a lounge and two private dining rooms. In addition, there were offices on the second story.

In the 1950s, the first three stories were gutted to make way for a triple-height lobby. The main section of the lobby included a marble registration desk on the second floor, accessed by escalators from the ground floor. Seven blocks of imported marble were installed inside the lobby. When the hotel was rebuilt in 1957, there was a main ballroom capable of accommodating 500 guests, as well as a lower-lobby ballroom with space for 200 guests. In addition, the lobby adjoined three restaurants: a luxury restaurant called the Playbill, a bar called the Manhattan Bar, and a cafe. Jac Lessman designed these dining rooms. In 1980, the hotel's main entrance was relocated to 45th Street to cater to people visiting Broadway theaters nearby. The reopened hotel included two lounges and a "brasserie-style" restaurant; these spaces were named after Broadway theaters.

The design of the Row NYC's lobby dates to a 2014 renovation by Gabellini Sheppard Associates. As part of the renovation, the lobby was converted into a 24-foot-high (7.3 m) space, and an illuminated staircase was placed in the lobby. Local artist Yorgo Alexopoulos designed two light sculptures, one on either side of the reception area. The lobby also includes a restaurant called District M.

==== Basements ====
The hotel was also to contain three basement levels. Part of one basement level was to contain an entrance to the New York City Subway's 42nd Street station, while the two other basement levels were supposed to contain a bus terminal. As built, the hotel had four basements, which housed the mechanical equipment, including a laundry plant that could wash more than 10,000 people's clothes per day.

=== Guestrooms ===
When it was planned, the Lincoln Hotel had 1,400 rooms on its upper stories, each with its own bathroom. When the hotel opened, guests could rent radios; signals were transmitted to each room using the girders of the hotel's steel frame, rather than using wires. After the Lincoln was rebuilt as the Manhattan Hotel in 1957, Lessman redecorated the rooms in either blue, green, gray, or gold. Each room was also outfitted with a television and a radio.

Following another renovation in 1980, the Milford Plaza Hotel had 1,310 rooms, which were decorated in black and burgundy. The rooms were designed by Marilynn Motto, with lighting by Howard Brandston. As late as the 1980s, the guestrooms did not have fire-safety systems such as sprinklers. In the 2010s, Gensler and Gabellini Sheppard redecorated the rooms, expanding the hotel to 1,331 rooms. The hotel also included a Penthouse Paparazzi suite, which covered 1,000 square feet (93 m^{2}) and was marketed for $2,520 per night when the Row NYC was renovated in 2014.

== History ==
Irwin Chanin was an American architect and real estate developer who designed several Art Deco towers and Broadway theaters. He and his brother Henry designed their first Manhattan buildings in 1924, including the Chanin Building. They then built and operated a number of theaters and other structures related to the entertainment industry, including the Roxy Theatre. By October 1926, the Chanins had decided to construct and operate a theatrical franchise "in New York and half a dozen other large cities in the United States".

=== Development ===
The Chanin brothers had acquired the Claman site in May 1925. The Chanins planned to build a 20-story hotel on Eighth Avenue and three theaters on the side streets. In March 1926, Krapp filed plans with the New York City Department of Buildings for the hotel and theaters, which were projected to cost $4.5 million. The total site, including land, was expected to cost $10 million. The brownstones on the site were razed starting in May, and the site was cleared by the next month. That July, the Chanin brothers received a $7.5 million loan for the four developments from S. W. Straus & Co. The three theaters were all named in December 1926; from largest to smallest, they were the Majestic, Royale, and Masque. The Chanins announced the same month that the hotel was to be known as the Lincoln. The brothers were also attempting to sell the hotel and lease it back for 21 years.

Excavation for the Hotel Lincoln began on August 7, 1926, and the hotel's foundation was constructed starting on November 1, 1926. Krapp's original plans had called for a Spanish-style design, but Irwin Chanin subsequently hired Schwartz & Gross to redesign the hotel. Chanin, an engineer by trade, was heavily involved in the hotel's design process, creating sketches of furniture that he wanted. Workers began erecting the steel frame on February 15, 1927. The hotel was topped out on May 17, 1927, when Irwin and Henry Chanin drilled two golden rivets at the top of the hotel's steel frame. The structure had taken only ten months to erect. The Chanin brothers resold the hotel in June 1927 to Irving I. Lewine and the United Cigar Stores Company. The Chanin brothers leased back the hotel for 63 years, except for the storefront at the corner of Eighth Avenue and 45th Street. The New York Times reported at the time that real estate values on Eighth Avenue between 42nd Street and Columbus Circle had increased by 200 percent over the preceding decade. The hotel's owners rented out three storefronts in August 1927. Later that year, additional storefronts were rented out to a shirt store and a barber shop.

In January 1928, eighty-one truckloads of furniture were delivered to the site, and the owners announced the hotel's opening date. James T. Clyde was hired as the Lincoln's first managing director that month, operating the hotel on behalf of the Chanin brothers. Upon its completion, the Lincoln was the tallest residential building around Times Square, as well as the tallest hotel in Manhattan west of Broadway. The hotel informally opened on January 31, 1928, when it started offering meal service to guests. The first recorded guest was a businessman from Houston, Texas. Governor Al Smith and mayor Jimmy Walker both sent the Chanins congratulatory telegrams after the Lincoln opened. The hotel's formal opening ceremony took place on February 13, 1928, coinciding with the observance of the Lincoln's Birthday holiday. At the official opening ceremony, a portrait of Lincoln was dedicated in the hotel's lobby, and Smith pressed a button at his Albany office to illuminate the hotel's rooftop sign.

=== Early years ===
==== Cigar Stores ownership ====
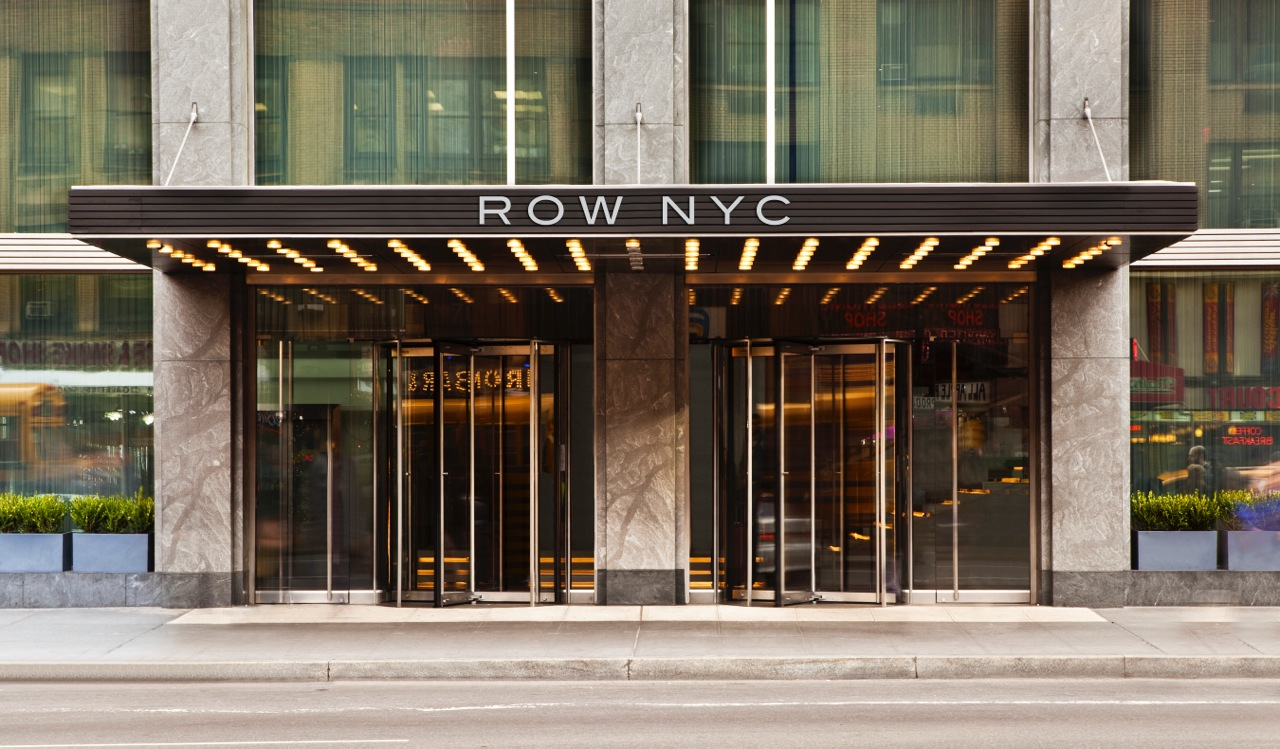
Front entrance

Irwin Chanin initially rented out rooms for $3 to $5 per night. The Eighth Avenue Association gave the Chanin brothers a plaque in March 1928 to celebrate the hotel's completion. That October, radio station WGBS opened an auxiliary studio atop the Hotel Lincoln. The Cigar Stores Realty Company bought the Hotel Lincoln in January 1929 as part of a $25 million purchase of multiple properties. The following month, the Metropolitan Life Insurance Company lent $3.8 million to the Lincoln's owners. Among the hotel's early events were meetings of the Theatrical Stock Managers' Association; meetings for John F. Hylan's 1929 mayoral campaign; and awards ceremonies for farmers. In addition, one of the storefronts was leased as a drugstore in 1930.

The United Cigar Stores Company acquired the Chanin brothers' lease of the hotel in 1931. The hotel was losing $350,000 annually by the next year. The hotel became part of the Reliance Property Management chain in February 1933, and the Irving Trust Company appointed Frank W. Kridel as the hotel's operator that June. The same month, the hotel received a permit to sell alcoholic beverages after Prohibition in the United States was repealed. Between 1930 and 1937, the hotel also hired big-name bands to play in the Blue Room for $2,500 a week. The hotel also hosted events such as a 1936 exhibition of Lincoln-related memorabilia. Kridel continued to manage the Lincoln Hotel until 1937 or 1938.

==== Kramer ownership ====
United Cigar Stores continued to own the hotel until May 1938, when it sold the Lincoln to Maria Kramer, owner of the Hotel Edison, for $7 million. United Cigars received $360,000 in cash and sold Kramer stock in the Lincoln Inc., the company that legally owned the building. Under Kramer's ownership, Consolidated Radio Artists received exclusive rights to perform in the hotel's grill room. The hotel's Blue Room became a popular venue for name bands, competing with nightclubs for business, and Variety magazine cited the Lincoln as "an important danceband outlet". The Blue Room was shuttered at the beginning of January 1942 but reopened that March. The Blue Room's performers included jazz pianist Count Basie; trumpeter Erskine Hawkins; and clarinetist Artie Shaw. In particular, Basie's band had been the first nonwhite band to perform at the Blue Room in 1943. The Lincoln's Blue Room closed for renovations in 1946, but the room was damaged by a flood just before it was to reopen; as a result, the room did not reopen until early 1947.

After Maria Kramer's husband Max died in 1946, Kramer and her stepsons became involved in a legal dispute over who owned the hotel. In January 1949, Kramer took over full ownership of the Lincoln and relinquished the Hotel Edison to her stepsons. The hotel was still three-fourths occupied as late as 1952. The Veterans of Foreign Wars opened a veterans' canteen at the hotel in October 1952, but the canteen closed in February 1954 due to a lack of funds. At the beginning of November 1955, the city government alleged that the Lincoln Hotel contained several violations of city building codes, including defective exit doors, "dirty and unsanitary" furnishings, and missing lights. The New York City Department of Housing said the violations dated to 1948 and recommended that Kramer be fined $500 and jailed for 30 days. By then, only 200 rooms on the lowest floors were in use, and the third through 27th floors were closed off completely. According to The New York Times, the hotel's upper floors had been in a state of disrepair for years. Kramer was ultimately fined $250, and she announced at the end of November 1955 that she was selling the hotel.

=== Zeckendorf operation ===
==== Renovation ====
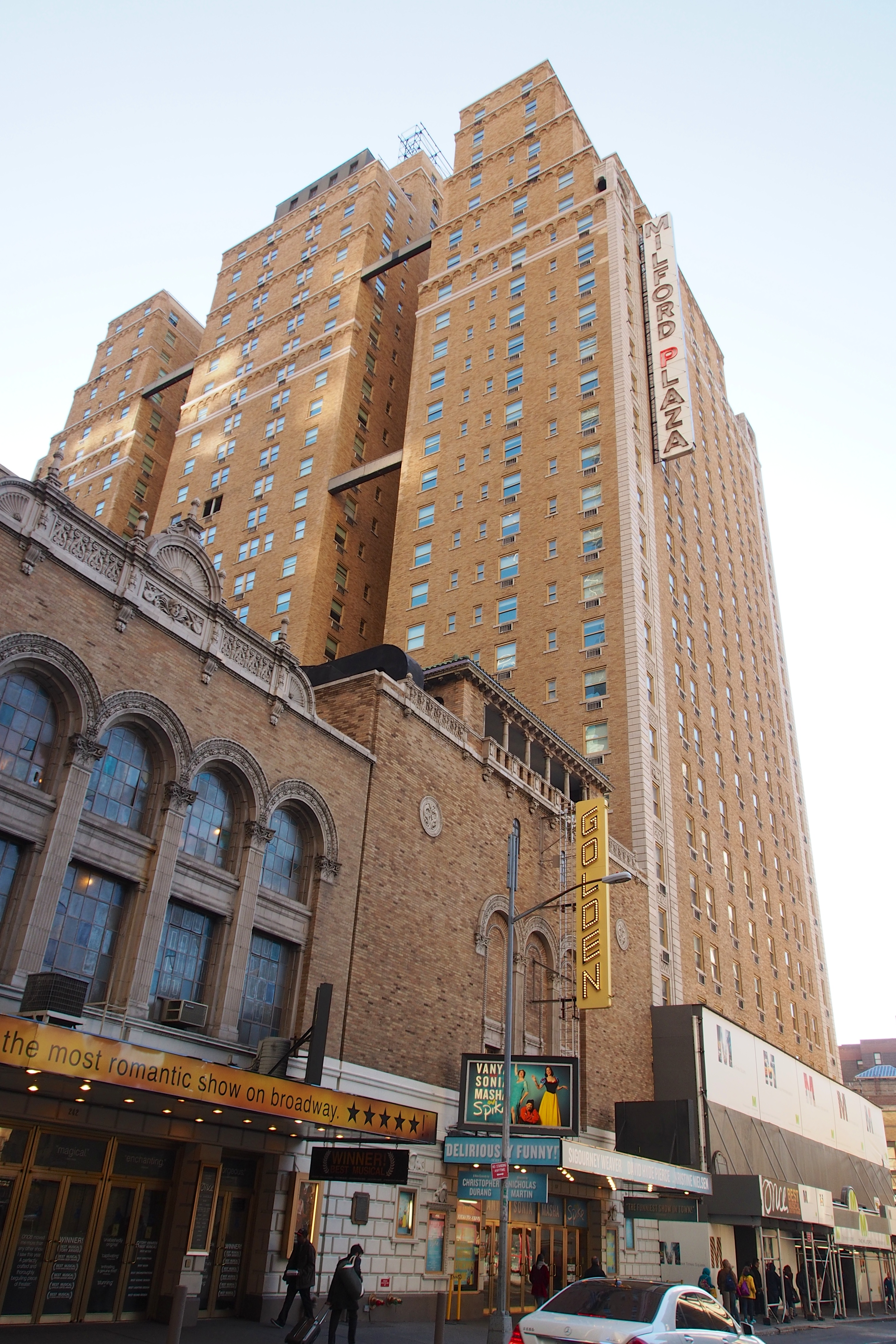
The hotel from the rear

In March 1956, Webb and Knapp, operated by real estate developer William Zeckendorf, purchased the Lincoln Hotel from Kramer, along with the Roosevelt Hotel in Washington, D.C. Zeckendorf said he had acquired the two hotels "because of the potential inherent in the properties". The deal involved $10 million in cash. Kramer negotiated a clause in the sale in which she was allowed to continue living in the Lincoln rent-free for 100 years. The sale of the two hotels was supposed to be finalized in May 1956 but was delayed by two months. Immediately after acquiring the Lincoln, Zeckendorf sold the hotel for $8.5 million to an unidentified investor and immediately leased back the property. Zeckendorf's lease ran for 21 years, but he had options to renew the lease ten times for 21 years each. Zeckendorf used the proceeds of the sale for a renovation of the hotel, which was budgeted at $3 million to $4 million. Webb and Knapp planned to renovate all 1,339 rooms and clean the facade.

Zeckendorf had evicted most tenants by July 1956, but there were 21 holdouts who refused to leave. Many of the holdouts were long-term residents who had consistently lived in the hotel since 1949 and were thus protected by state rent regulation laws. Thirteen tenants asked for buyouts of between $7,000 and $10,000 each, although Zeckendorf was only willing to pay $3,000 per tenant. The hotel began selling off furnishings and furniture at the beginning of August 1956, excluding items in the apartments that were still occupied. Within four days, all of the items in the building had been sold. Shortly afterward, the last rent-controlled tenants, including a woman who had lived there since 1929, agreed to move in exchange for a buyout of $3,000 each. The existing Hotel Lincoln sign was removed on August 17, 1956, and workers began demolishing part of the hotel's interior. The last tenant moved out on August 22, 1956, although some homeless people remained in the building past that date.

New York City's fire commissioner threatened to halt the demolition process in late August 1956, claiming that the building contained numerous fire hazards. The next month, the hotel was renamed the Manhattan Hotel. Frank Kridel, who had managed the Lincoln in the 1930s, was rehired as the Manhattan's manager in December 1956. The hotel was almost entirely rebuilt, retaining only the original foundation, steel structure, and facade. As part of the project, the lowest three stories were almost entirely demolished, and new restaurants, offices, and ballrooms were constructed there. On the upper stories, workers patched and repaired the floor slabs and plaster walls, but everything else was replaced, including the wires, plumbing, windows, doors, and roof. Five hundred workers were employed on the project at its peak. Webb and Knapp started leasing out the hotel's storefronts in April 1957, and Harold Kelley was appointed as the Manhattan's resident manager the same month.

==== Reopening and operation ====
Webb and Knapp had originally planned to formally reopen the hotel on October 15, 1957. The managers decided to open 750 of the hotel's 1,400 rooms two weeks early to accommodate baseball fans attending the World Series. The Manhattan Hotel opened on September 30, 1957, with actress Nancy Kelly as the hotel's first individual guest, although the Nebraska Cornhuskers football team had stayed at the Manhattan over the weekend prior to its reopening. Workers completed additional guestrooms during the following month. The hotel, which cost $5.5 million to renovate, was advertised as the first new luxury hotel in Manhattan since the Waldorf Astoria New York opened in 1931. Kridel wanted to advertise the Manhattan Hotel to athletes, fashion-industry buyers, businesspeople, tourists, and theatergoers. However, he did not want to attract trade shows, which he believed would damage the hotel both physically and in reputation. To cater to foreign guests, Zeckendorf hired a concierge who could speak eight languages.

By January 1958, all 1,400 rooms had been opened, but the Playbill Restaurant was not complete. Kridel said at the time that the hotel had accommodated over 150,000 guests, 25 college and professional football teams, and 23 conventions since its reopening. Although Webb and Knapp initially contemplated hiring a band to play at the hotel, Kridel ultimately decided against it, saying that the $10,000 weekly cost of hiring a band was prohibitively high. In late 1960, Zeckendorf contemplated selling his leases of the Astor, Commodore, and Manhattan hotels to raise money for the Freedomland U.S.A. amusement park in the Bronx, in which Zeckendorf also owned a majority stake. This plan was approved in June 1961, and Freedomland U.S.A., assumed the leases on the three hotels. After Kridel died in 1961, Erwin O. Schel was appointed as the Manhattan's general manager. Harold V. Varr was appointed as the hotel's general manager at the beginning of 1964, after Schel was promoted to a vice president within Zeckendorf's company.

Webb and Knapp were deeply in debt by 1964. Lincoln Associates, which owned the land under the Manhattan, had taken over the hotel's finances, though Zeckendorf was still in charge of day-to-day operation. Manastor Associates, which held the primary lease on the Manhattan Hotel and subleased it to Webb and Knapp, started paying the hotel's salaries and other operating expenses that May. Zeckendorf was trying to buy Manastor at the time but was unable to complete the purchase. The 91468 Corporation, a subsidiary of Webb and Knapp that operated the Manhattan, filed for bankruptcy protection in August 1964, with about $6.4 million in liabilities and about $5.7 million in assets. After Webb and Knapp went bankrupt the next year, Lincoln Associates took over operation of the Manhattan. The owners appointed Joseph Hanfling as the hotel's general manager in 1966.

=== Grand Metropolitan ownership and closure ===
In October 1968, Abraham Kamber of Lincoln Associates said his firm was selling the hotel, although he did not know the names of the buyers. Around the same time, Maxwell Joseph of British firm Grand Metropolitan said his firm was almost certain to acquire the Manhattan Hotel. Grand Metropolitan bought the Manhattan for $10 million in January 1969. The property title passed to Grand Metropolitan subsidiary Grandmet, and Grand Metropolitan assumed a $7.5 million mortgage that had been placed on the property. The hotel was immediately renamed the Royal Manhattan, reflecting the buyer's British heritage. Grand Metropolitan largely advertised the hotel toward foreign tourists. The Eastern College Athletic Conference was headquartered at the Royal Manhattan, and the hotel also hosted events such as British antiques shows.

By the early 1970s, the hotel was losing $1 million per year, prompting Grand Metropolitan Inc. to announce in November 1974 that they would close the hotel. The owners claimed that they could not afford to pay the hotel's taxes, which amounted to $625,000 per year. At the time, many non-luxury hotels in New York City were suffering financially. In addition, the surrounding neighborhood had declined significantly, and the nearby Times Square had become associated with prostitution and high crime. The hotel closed on December 7, 1974; by then, the hotel was valued at just $4 million. Grand Metropolitan tried to sell the hotel but struggled to find a buyer. The Royal Manhattan was one of three shuttered hostelries on Eighth Avenue in Midtown that were having trouble attracting buyers; the others were the New Yorker Hotel and the 51st Street YWCA. The New York City government scheduled a foreclosure auction for the hotel in November 1975. Although the hotel was offered for $1.8 million, the auction did not attract any bids. The terms of the sale, which one real estate analyst described as "severe", required potential buyers to make mortgage payments for at least five years.

The F. & N. Refrigeration and Cabinet Corporation, a shell corporation representing a syndicate of foreign investors, bought the hotel in December 1975. The buyers paid about $500,000, plus $175,000 in back taxes. Despite the low sale price, the hotel was still valued at $8.5 million at the time, although the city government revised the hotel's valuation to $4.5 million in 1976. Investors began to express interest in converting hotels to apartment buildings after the New York City government amended its J-51 tax abatement program in early 1976. Among them were a group of Europeans led by Israeli investor Shmuel Flatto-Sharon, who bought the hotel the same year. In preparation for the planned apartment conversion, the hotel's owners began auctioning off its furnishings in July 1976; the auction was expected to last several months. Flatto-Sharon's group opted to sell the Royal Manhattan after failing to obtain financing for the development. Homeless people frequented the boarded-up hotel. Its restaurant was featured in the 1977 erotic film Barbara Broadcast, directed by Radley Metzger.

=== Milstein ownership ===
==== Renovation and reopening ====
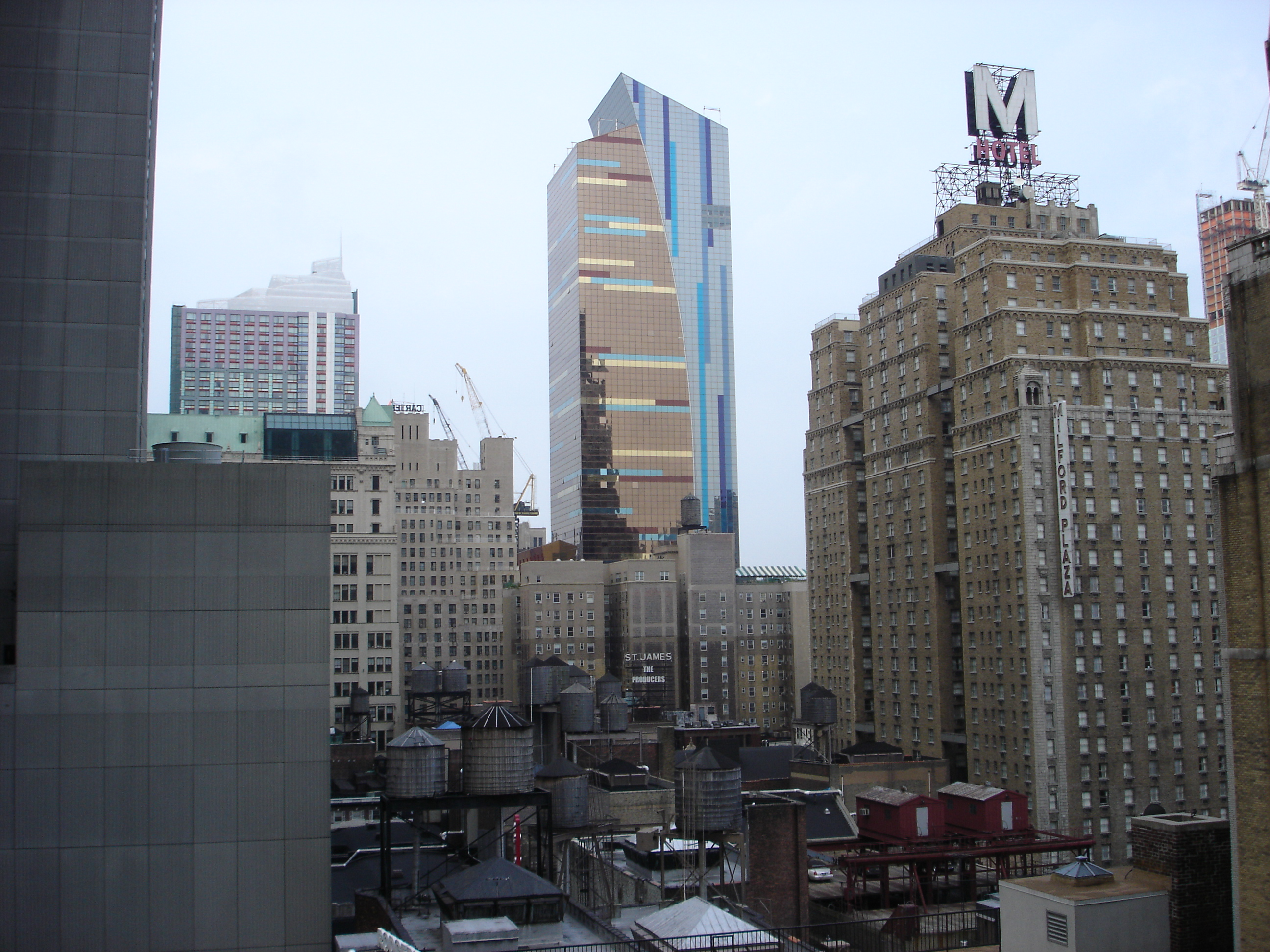
The hotel in 2005

Sisix Corporation, representing the Milstein family, purchased the hotel for $2.5 million in 1978, with plans to renovate the hotel into an apartment building. The development was to have either 512 or 565 apartments, consisting of studios, one-bedroom apartments, and two-bedroom apartments. Sisix Corp. began looking for financing for the project. At the time, several large developments were being planned around Times Square. By early 1979, the Milsteins had still not received a mortgage; because of high demand for hotel rooms around Times Square, they were considering reopening the hotel instead of converting it into apartments. The next year, the New York City government's Industrial Commercial Incentive Board voted to grant a tax abatement for the redevelopment. After the hotel reopened, the family would pay reduced taxes for 20 years, and the tax abatement would be reduced by 5 percent each year.

The Milsteins planned to spend $14.5 million on renovations, but the project ultimately cost an estimated $15 million to $20 million. The family announced in April 1980 that the hotel would be called the Milford Plaza, and they hired Charles Waterman as the hotel's manager. The Milsteins wanted to attract guests who were visiting nearby Broadway theaters. As such, the hotel's main entrance faced the Broadway theaters on 45th Street, and advertisements for Broadway shows were placed on the Eighth Avenue facade. The Broadway League branded the Milford Plaza as the "Official Broadway Theater Hotel". The Milstein family wished to open the hotel by mid-1980 in advance of the 1980 Democratic National Convention. Milford Plaza reopened on August 1, 1980. It offered moderately priced rooms for between $39 and $49. The Milsteins could only afford such low room rates because of the tax abatement. The hotel was one of several in Midtown Manhattan to be completed during the early 1980s, amid an increase in tourism in New York City.

==== 1980s to 2000s ====
When the Milford Plaza opened, Manhattan Community Board 5 gave the Milsteins an award "for the courageous reopening of a hotel on Eighth Avenue". Architectural critic Ada Louise Huxtable wrote that the hotel rooms were "badly needed", and Alan S. Oser of The New York Times said the Milsteins' decision to convert the Milford Plaza back to a hotel "reflected the improvement in hotel occupancy". In the first three months after the hotel's reopening, the Milford Plaza's resident manager Gregory Rizzi said the hotel "has been running at full occupancy, and I would say that between 65 and 70 percent of our volume is foreign tourists." Even at the end of 1980, the hotel was still 90 percent occupied, in spite of the early 1980s recession. However, the recession caused the occupancy rate to decline during early 1981, and Paul Milstein estimated that he lost $5 million as a result. One year after the hotel reopened, the Chicago Tribune wrote that the hotel had become "popular for glittering post-theater parties". According to The New York Times, some observers credited the hotel with helping spur the revitalization of Times Square.

As part of a publicity campaign, Cinema Projects produced a TV advertisement for the hotel called "Lullabuy of Broadway," which first aired on June 21, 1982. The advertisement, which used the song "Lullaby of Broadway", became widely known; Paul Milstein later described it as the first "national advertising gimmick for a non-chain hotel". On November 19, 1987, "Late Night With David Letterman" was broadcast from the Helen Hayes Suite on the hotel's 26th floor; guests included Carly Simon and Hunter S. Thompson. The Mamma Leone's restaurant opened at the base of the Milford Plaza in 1988 and operated until 1994. Mamma Leone's parent company Restaurant Associates also operated the hotel's room service during this time. The Milford Plaza underwent another renovation in 1994 at a cost of $10 million; the hotel was financially successful by then, even though its room rates had increased to $120 per night. Around the same time, the Milford Plaza's operators opened a health club and made plans for a fitness center. The hotel also installed a currency exchange in its lobby. The Milford Plaza became a franchisee of the Ramada hotel chain in 1994, although the franchise agreement expired in 2000.

The Milstein family was involved in an acrimonious family dispute in the early 2000s. Paul Milstein's brother Seymour claimed that Paul's son Howard was mismanaging the hotel's finances. Seymour filed to dissolve his family's company in March 2001, asking a New York state judge to auction off the Milford Plaza and other buildings that the family owned. In response, Paul accused Seymour of trying to sell the building behind his back. Seymour Milstein died later that year, while the dispute was ongoing. Business declined significantly following the September 11 attacks in 2001. The proposed sale of the Milford Plaza was delayed by one year, but brokers were about to sell the hotel by the end of 2002. The family ultimately agreed to a settlement in April 2003, and they canceled the sale of the Milford Plaza and several other properties. The Milsteins announced in September 2009 that the Milford Plaza was to undergo a renovation that would take 18 to 21 months. In preparation for the renovation, the Milsteins laid off 350 employees and closed the hotel that December. The Milstein family decided to suspend their renovation plan indefinitely in early 2010 due to an economic downturn.

=== Rockpoint and Highgate ownership ===
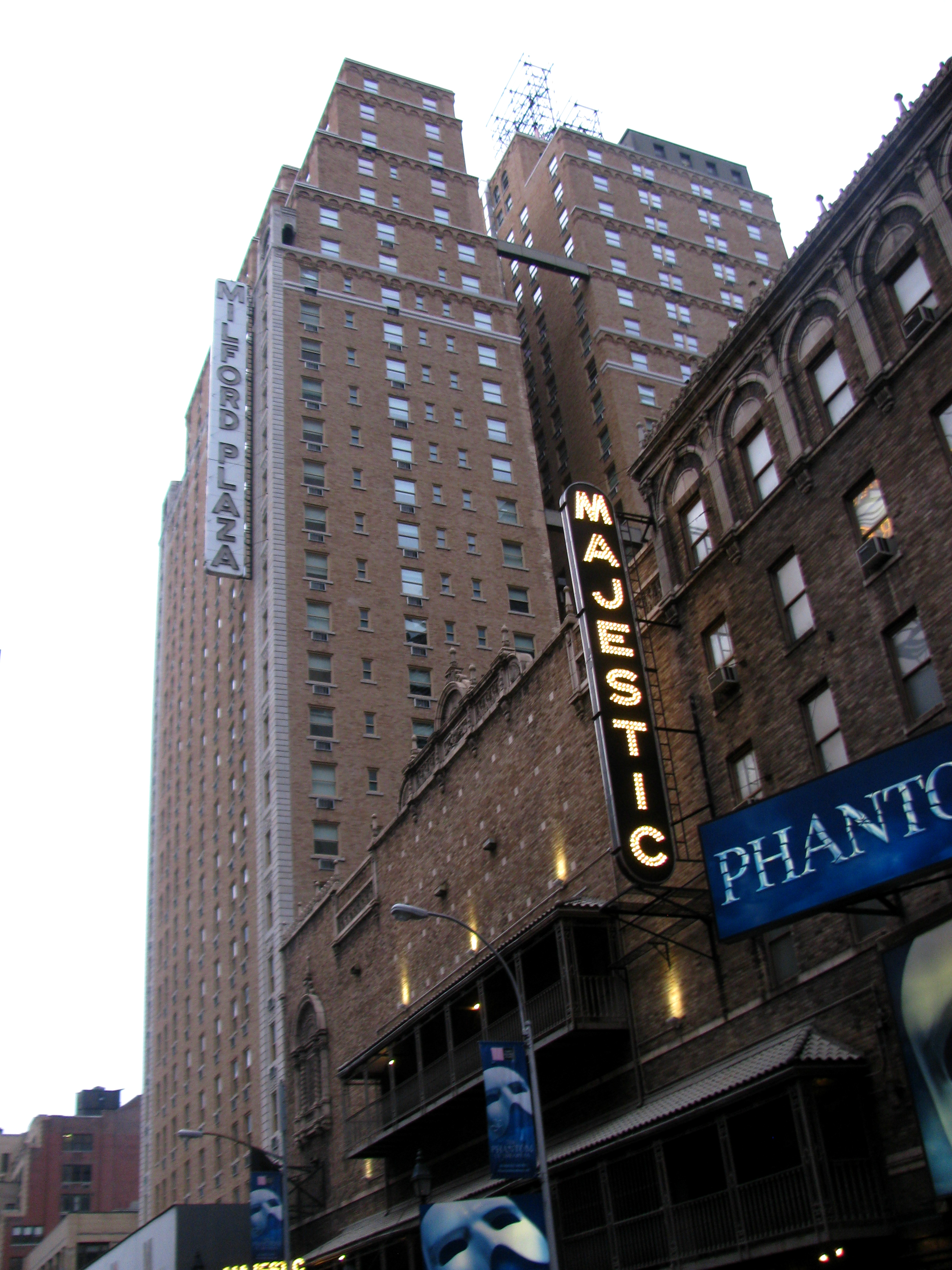
Seen from 44th Street with the Majestic Theatre in the foreground

In September 2010, Rockpoint Group and hotel operator Highgate Holdings announced that they would purchase the hotel from the Milstein family for $200 million. This amounted to approximately $154,000 per room, a lower rate than other hotels in New York City that were sold around the same time. Rockpoint and Highgate partially reopened the hotel in November 2010. Rockpoint and Highgate said they wished to convert "a two-star, tour-and-travel hotel with no amenities into a three-and-a-half-star lifestyle hotel". Consequently, they began an extensive $140 million renovation. As part of the renovation, Rockpoint and Highgate added 62 rooms, bringing the hotel to 1,331 rooms. The hotel was also planned to include a food hall covering 4,000 square feet (370 m^{2}), within the Mama Leone's space, as well as a fitness center covering 4,900 square feet (460 m^{2}). The renovation was completed in March 2014.

Highgate proposed dividing the hotel into three ownership units in 2012: the land, the 1,331 guestrooms, and the 26,000-square-foot retail unit. The owners predicted that the three ownership units would sell for a combined $650 million. David Werner, in partnership with Deutsche Asset & Wealth Management's real estate investment business, purchased the land parcel the next month for $325 million, about 30 percent more than what Rockpoint and Highgate had paid for the entire hotel three years earlier. Meridian Capital Group provided a $275 million mortgage for the hotel. After Werner purchased the land, other investors expressed interest in buying the rooms and retail space as part of a commercial mortgage-backed security deal. Thor Equities, led by Joseph Sitt, agreed to buy the Milford Plaza's commercial condominium in 2013. The sale was finalized in April 2014, when Thor paid $64 million. Thor Equities subsequently received a $50 million mortgage loan for the site from Goldman Sachs. The City Kitchen food court opened at the base of the Row NYC in March 2015, and Thor placed the commercial condominium for sale that June, with an asking price of $100 million.

In February 2019, Highgate and Rockpoint placed the final piece of the property for sale, the hotel rooms, for $220 million. By the following year, Colony Credit Real Estate, whose predecessor NorthStar had provided a $255 million mortgage for the land, was looking to sell the mortgage for as little as $50 million. The hotel was forced to close temporarily in 2020 due to the onset of the COVID-19 pandemic in New York City. Werner began falling behind on mortgage payments in May 2020. The Paramount Group, which had lent $80 million to Thor Equities for the Row NYC's commercial condominium, foreclosed on the condominium in April 2022. At the time, the condominium was valued as $45 million, about 30 percent less than the price Thor had paid in 2014. Wells Fargo moved to foreclose on Werner's loan in September 2022.

Following an influx of asylum seekers to New York City in mid-2022, city officials considered converting part of the Row NYC into temporary housing for 700 asylum seekers that year. The city government agreed that October to use the Row NYC Hotel to house migrants as part of an agreement valued at $40 million. By the beginning of 2023, hotel workers had raised safety concerns because migrants sometimes violated quarantine requirements, would not let staff into their rooms, and cooked in their rooms despite a ban on electronic cooking devices at the hotel. In August 2025, the city government announced that the hotel would stop hosting migrants by April 2026, when the migrant shelter's lease expired. A renovation was announced in February 2026, and the hotel reopened to overnight guests on May 5, 2026.

== Critical reception ==
When the hotel opened, W. Parker Chase described the hotel as serving "the better element of the Masses". By contrast, George S. Chappell, writing for The New Yorker under the pseudonym "T-Square", wrote that the hotel was "very big without being especially impressive". Another New Yorker article stated of the interior: "Some will say that the modernity here exemplified is confusing; some will miss the uniformity of effect that a Georgian interior, for example, presents. But one feels that in the lobby of the new hotel, a vivid contemporary dramatization of New York has been achieved."

In 1980, a Newsday critic said that "the three-decker, red-and-velvet, glass-and-brass velvet lobby is blinding, but rooms are tasteful." The Chicago Tribune wrote in 1981 that the "rooms are spacious and pleasant" and that the hotel benefited from its proximity to Broadway theaters. Another writer for Newsday said that the Milford Plaza, along with the nearby New Amsterdam Theatre, ranked among the "imposing, traditional Times Square buildings with classical features".

Conversely, a reviewer for Zagat wrote of the hotel in the late 1980s: "I'd rather camp out in the Port Authority," referring to the nearby bus terminal. A writer for the Los Angeles Times said in 1985 that, although the rooms were cheap, the hotel had a "bare minimum" of amenities in its bathrooms. Lewis Grizzard of The Atlanta Constitution wrote an especially negative review of the Milford Plaza in 1990, in which he wrote: "For 50 bucks you can stay in the Milford Plaza [...] any hotel in Manhattan that would offer you a room at that meager cost might also offer you the risk of catching Lyme disease." This review prompted the Milsteins to sue Grizzard for defamation in 1991. A writer for New York magazine wrote: "Truthfully, the reason most people stay here is location; its proximity to the city's brightest marquees ensures theatergoers can be in bed shortly after the curtain drops. Otherwise, the 1,300 rooms are slightly antiquated."

== See also ==
- List of hotels in New York City
