= E. D. Berman =

American-born British community educator, activist and dramatist (born 1941)

E. D. Berman MBE FRSA
- Born: Edward David Berman; 8 March 1941 (age 85); Lewiston, Maine, U.S.
- Other name: R. L. Dogg
- Education: Lewiston High School; Harvard University; Exeter College, Oxford University
- Occupations: Community educator social activist children's poet playwright director producer
- Title: Rhodes Scholars in Britain (founding chair and trustee, 2014)
- Parent(s): Jack and Ida (née Webber) Berman

Edward David Berman MBE FRSA (born 8 March 1941 in Lewiston, Maine) is an American-born British community educator, social activist, children's poet, playwright, director and producer. In 1979, Queen Elizabeth II appointed Berman a Member of the Order of the British Empire (MBE) for Services to Community Education and Community Arts, examples of which include city farms, Instant Business Enterprise System, the Inter-Action Creative Game Method, Fun Art Bus I & II, the Community Media Van, FabLab on Wheels, the Father and Mother Xmas Union, and Inter-Action – the umbrella organization for a range of innovative, creativity-based projects and community training systems. Later, Berman saved the World War I ship HMS President (1918), which became the charity's centre for 15 years.

He became founding chair (2014) of Rhodes Scholars in Britain and a trustee. In 2015, he was invited by MIT's Bits and Atoms to establish Fab Foundation UK. A Harvard graduate and Rhodes Scholar in 1962, Berman is Inter-Action's founder (1968) and CEO. Currently, in addition to the activities above, Berman runs international workshops and training courses in the Inter-Action Creative Game Method and Inter-Action Instant Business Enterprise System.

== Early life and education ==
Berman was in Lewiston, Maine, to Jack and Ida (née Webber) Berman. He attended Lewiston High School but, despite becoming a regional and national debating champion, did not graduate. Instead, he accepted the offer of a place at Harvard University at the age of 15, to study Government & Middle Eastern Languages and Literature. He was a resident at Winthrop House and graduated in the Class of 1961.

He then won a Rhodes Scholarship to study at Exeter College, Oxford University, in 1962. Berman was unable to finish his doctorate at Oxford in 1965, due to an unprovoked attack while researching in Istanbul, Turkey, which left him with a cranial blood clot and a badly damaged back, being given a year to live. Unable to continue his research, Berman moved to London.

== Inter-Action and community action/development ==
Berman established Inter-Action in London in 1968 to explore new forms of creative and participatory programmes for the Inner City, and find new ways to motivate learning. The work is targeted at disadvantaged families and young people (especially young girls and young women in science and technology), children with learning disabilities and people returning to education or seeking training. It has been described as "the most exciting community education agency in Europe".

Essentially, Inter-Action is involved in problem-solving work of a community development nature. It takes specific challenges and tries to develop practical projects and techniques that can be widely disseminated and used by others throughout the UK and Europe. The work with disadvantaged groups of young people (and adults) and especially girls/young women has been a major theme throughout the decades of the work of Inter-Action and now Fab Foundation UK.

Inter-Action Trust (later Inter-Action Social Enterprise Trust) has been the umbrella for Berman's activities, including a series of theatres, at least six theatre companies, community festivals and seasons of plays, making print and radio media accessible to local communities, establishing the first city farm, the National Federation of City Farms and Community Gardens (see below), the first community architecture service in Europe and numerous other projects. Inter-Action commissioned the first community arts resource centre in Europe, which was purpose-built on a derelict Council site in Talacre Road, west Kentish Town, London, designed by Cedric Price. Inter-Action has influenced the work of numerous other community arts initiatives as well as direct offshoots in Milton Keynes and Leeds.

The Father & Mother Xmas Union (FXU) was set up in 1969 to stage large-scale social and activist events such as protests against the National Front and Selfridges (for using non unionised workers.).

City Farms: In 1971, Berman negotiated with British Rail to take over numerous tracts (10,000 acres) of land throughout the UK that were unusable for development under modern planning legislation because of their proximity to the railway lines. He established the first city farm in Britain in Kentish Town, north London, in 1971 (which became a model for city farms across the country) and then the National Federation of City Farms and Community Gardens, which currently includes approximately 1,200 City Farms and Community Gardens throughout the UK.

Fun Art Bus: In 1972, to bring theatre and arts into the community, Inter-Action converted a Routemaster bus to create a small theatre on its upper deck, along with a cinema showing short films and slide shows downstairs. The bus was brought back during the 2012 Olympic Games, in which Berman was a torchbearer.

HMS President: In 1988, the ship was saved by the charity Inter-Action Social Enterprise Trust, run by Berman, who invented the term "social enterprise" in the UK in 1970, to describe organisations such as the National Federation of City Farms and Community Gardens, which has more than 1,200 sites. In President, social enterprises included: a base for start-up companies for young people; audio-visual studios; a publishing company; an NGO Advisory Service, and an 'event deck' to earn funding for the charity. This period saved her from scrap, and preserved her for future generations. She had become a London landmark, marked on street maps, so was permitted to retain her warship title and name "HMS President" with the added suffix "(1918)" to distinguish her from the new shore establishment of the same name. Her sister ship, Chrysanthemum, was hired to Steven Spielberg for the boat chase sequences shot in 1988 in Tilbury Docks for the film Indiana Jones and the Last Crusade. She was then laid up in the River Medway, where the brackish water rusted her hull so badly that she was scrapped in 1995.

Numerous other activities include the establishment of WAC – the Weekend Arts College (now simply Wac Arts), the first Community Media Van, a community print shop including the publishing arm, Inter-Action In-Print, a film company, Infilms, a new centre on HMS President (1918), a free school and a plethora of media and computer projects from the 1980s onward; then two more theatre companies: the Old Age Theatre Society (OATS) working in old people's homes and the British American Repertory Company (BARC), the first joint company approved by both Equity Unions and both countries for non-star actors and stage staff.

Additionally, he has been Chairman of the successful Save Piccadilly Campaign in the 1970s (to stop the high-rise office development surrounding the Circus) and the action against JP Morgan to open their blocking of a walkway/cycling path of the Thames Walkway on the Isle of Dogs. Berman continues to spend part of each year in India, advising on social enterprise projects, mainly with women, and environmental projects, especially water developments.

He has worked in Hong Kong, Germany, the Netherlands, Denmark, Norway, Sweden, Russia, South Africa and India as a director/trainer as well as advising on developing new social enterprises. In Russia, he worked as an adviser to three state ministers and in the UK as a non-party-political Special Advisor on inner-city matters to Cabinet ministers, Michael Heseltine and Tom King. All of these he did while remaining in the Inter-Action Co-operative.

== Theatre career ==
During the 1960s, Berman became a prominent figure in British Alternative Theatre. In 1967, he became the playwright-in-residence at the Mercury Theatre in Notting Hill.

The Ambiance Lunch-hour Theatre Club and the Almost-Free Theatre

In 1971, Berman set up the Almost Free Theatre on Rupert Street, Soho, in London's West End. The audiences paid what they could afford (at least one penny) to see a range of productions based on a range of social and political themes. The Almost Free also staged numerous individual new plays by Mike Stott, Henry Livings, Michael Stevens, Wolf Mankowitz, Edward Bond and many others. Sir Tom Stoppard developed several of his key one-act plays for Berman's theatres, including After Magritte, Dogg's Hamlet, Cahoot's Macbeth and the highly successful Dirty Linen and New-Found-Land.

Dirty Linen and New-Found-Land

Two 1976 Tom Stoppard plays that are always performed together, Dirty Linen and New-Found-Land were produced and directed as a pair by Berman. New-Found-Land interrupts the two parts of Dirty Linen. It is a comedy about the British citizenship process, based on the real-life naturalization of Berman. It was first performed as an Ambiance Lunch-Hour Theatre Club presentation at Interaction's Almost Free Theatre in 1976. Then, opening in June 1976, it played for more than four years at the Arts.

Black Theatre Season

Berman programmed Britain's first season of plays on black issues: Black and White Power Plays at the Ambiance in 1970. The season introduced the work of African-American playwrights including Ed Bullins and LeRoi Jones, alongside work from white playwrights, such as Israel Horovitz, on Black issues.

Gay Theatre Season

The 1975 season of gay plays was the first to be staged in Britain. The season led to the formation of gay theatre companies, principally Gay Sweatshop, Britain's first gay and lesbian theatre company, founded by Gerald Chapman.

Dogg's Troupe

Dogg's Troupe staged street theatre and community events in hospitals, old people's homes and other community venues. Berman played the roles of Professor R.L. Dogg and Otto Premiere Check.

TOC (The Other Company)

The Other Company was set up by Berman and the innovative Israeli director Naftali Yavin in 1968.

== Plays and publications ==
Below is a selection of plays, publications and albums written or recorded by Berman. Some publications are published under the name R. L. Dogg, Berman's title character from Dogg's Troupe community theatre group.

=== Bibliography ===
- Berman, E., & Wintle, J. (1973), The Fun Art Bus: An Inter-Action Project by ED Berman. London: Eyre Methuen. ISBN 978-0-413-29780-8
- Berman, E. (1975) Homosexual Acts: A Volume of Gay Plays. London: Hill and Garwood Printing. ISBN 978-0-904571-07-3
- Biren, A. (1975), Basic Video in Community Work. London: Inter-Action In-Print. ISBN 9780904571059
- Berman, E. (1979), 10 of the Best: British Short Plays. London: Inter-Action In-Print and Billing and Sons. ISBN 0 904571 17 3
- Berman, E., & J. Zeitlyn (1980), Print: How you can do it yourself, 3rd Edition. London: Inter-Action In-Print. ISBN 0904571246
- Berman, E & Elizabeth Leyh (1980), Concrete Sculpture, 1st Edition. London: Inter-Action In-Print. ISBN 0904571319
- Humphries, S (1984), The Handbook of Oral History: Recording Life Stories. London: Inter-Action In-Print. ISBN 0904571467
- Berman, E., & L. Dewhurst (1984), Selecting Business Software: A Guide to Success with Microcomputing. London: Frances Printer. ISBN 0861874889
- Berman, E. & Huw Richard (1985), Make a Real Job Of It. Inter-Action in Print. London: Inter-Action In-Print. ISBN 08611-0-3297
- Berman, E. (1986) Breaks for Young Bands. Introduction by Sting. London: Omnibus Press & Inter-Action In-Print. ISBN 0711909784
- Berman, E. (1987), How to Set up a Small Business. London: University Press, Cambridge. ISBN 0521310059
- Dowmunt, T. (1987), Video with Young People. London: Inter-Action In-Print & Cassell Publishers. ISBN 0304314862
- Berman, E. (1989), Healthy Learning Songs: Activities and Projects. London: BBC Books. ISBN 0563343672
- Berman, E., & Gorney C. (1989), New Game-Songs. London: Inter-Action and BBC Books. ISBN 0 563 34 371 0
- Berman, E. (2001), Game Songs with Prof Dogg's Troupe. London: Inter-Action In-Print and A&C Black. ISBN 0 7136 6207 7
- ED Berman, ed. (1975). The Inter-Action Advisory Service Handbook 6. Inter-Action Inprint. ISBN 978-0904571066.

Converting a Bus
Battered Women and the Law
Bringing Books to People
Charitable Status
Basic Video and Community work
Print: How You Can Do It Yourself

As Professor R. L. Dogg

- Dogg, R. L., & E. Leyh (1974), Zoo’s Who: Poetry and Colouring Book Volume 1. London: Inter-Action In-Print.
- Dogg, R. L., & E. Leyh (1974), Zoo’s Who: Poetry and Colouring Book Volume 2. London: Inter-Action In-Print. ISBN 0 904 571 02 5
