= John Golden Theatre =

Broadway theater in Manhattan, New York

- Theatre Masque
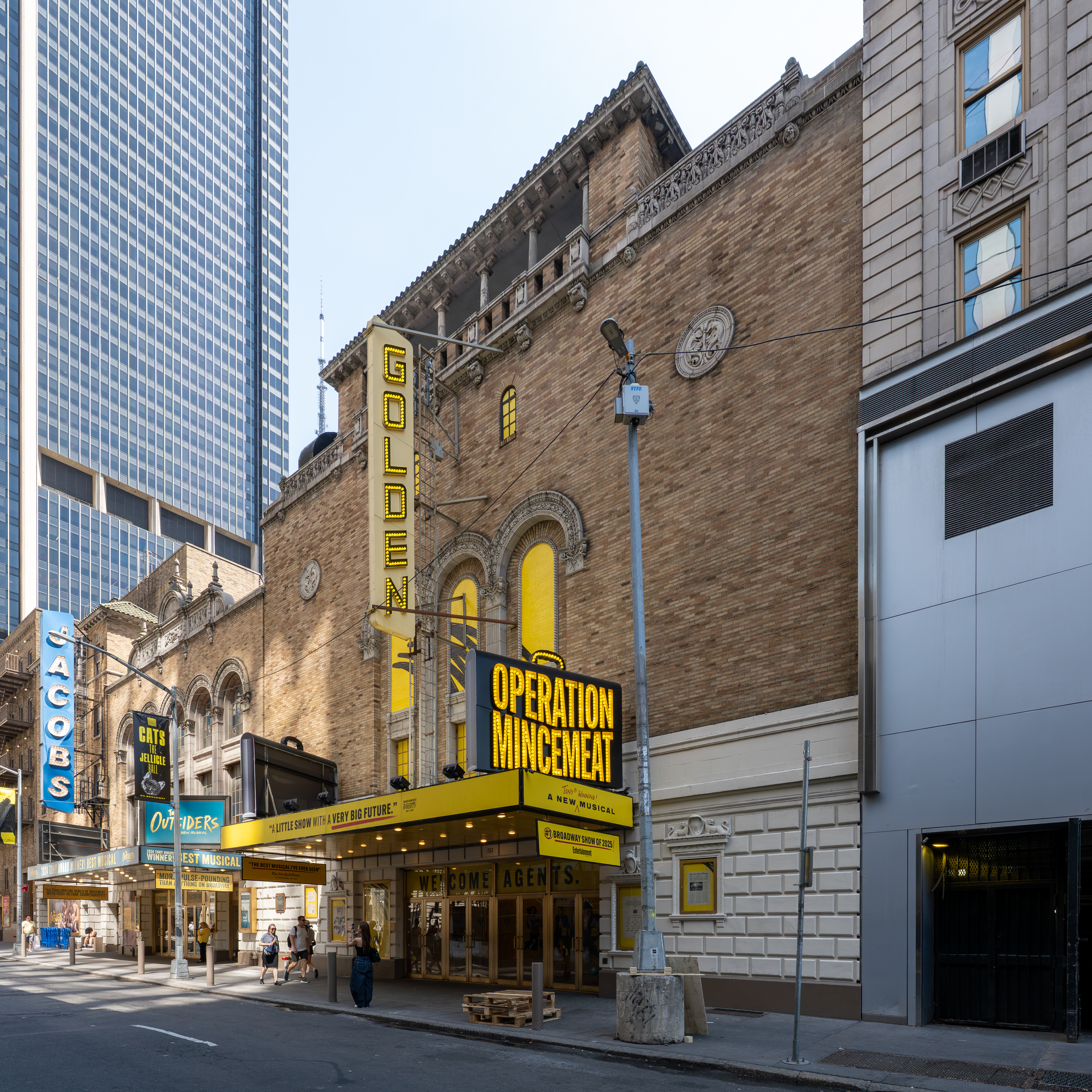
- Interactive map of John Golden Theatre
- Address: 252 West 45th Street; Manhattan, New York; United States
- Coordinates: 40°45′31.5″N 73°59′16.6″W
- Owner: The Shubert Organization
- Capacity: 802
- Type: Broadway
- Production: Operation Mincemeat
- Public transit: Subway: Times Square–42nd Street/Port Authority Bus Terminal

Construction
- Opened: February 24, 1927 (99 years ago)
- Years active: 1927–1946, 1948–present
- Architect: Herbert J. Krapp

Website
- Official website

New York City Landmark
- Designated: November 17, 1987
- Reference no.: 1335
- Designated entity: Facade

New York City Landmark
- Designated: November 17, 1987
- Reference no.: 1336
- Designated entity: Auditorium interior

The John Golden Theatre, formerly the Theatre Masque and Masque Theater, is a Broadway theater at 252 West 45th Street (George Abbott Way) in the Theater District of Midtown Manhattan in New York City, New York, U.S. Opened in 1927, the Golden Theatre was designed by Herbert J. Krapp in a Spanish style and was built for real-estate developer Irwin S. Chanin. It has 800 seats across two levels and is operated by the Shubert Organization. Both the facade and the auditorium interior are New York City landmarks.

The facade is made of golden brick, terracotta, and stone. The ground floor exterior, which contains the theater's entrance, is clad in rusticated terracotta blocks above a granite water table. Above are a set of three double-height arches, as well as two terracotta plaques. The facade is topped by a loggia. The auditorium contains Spanish-style detailing, a large balcony, and a rib-arched ceiling. Due to the theater's small size, it lacks box seats. The balcony, proscenium arch, and exit arches are ornately decorated, with geometric panels and twisting colonettes.

The Masque, Majestic, and Royale (now Bernard B. Jacobs) theaters, along with the Lincoln Hotel, were all developed by Chanin and designed by Krapp as part of a theater/hotel complex. The Masque opened on February 24, 1927, and was the second of the three theaters to open. The Shubert family took over the Masque in 1930 but subsequently went into receivership, and producer John Golden leased the theater in 1936. Golden renamed the theater after himself in 1937, and the Shuberts regained full control in 1945. The Golden has mostly remained in legitimate use since then, except from 1946 to 1948, when it was used as a cinema. Over the years, the Golden has largely been used for productions with small casts, as well as revues.

== Site ==
The John Golden Theatre is on 252 West 45th Street, on the south sidewalk between Eighth Avenue and Seventh Avenue, near Times Square in the Theater District of Midtown Manhattan in New York City, New York, U.S. The rectangular land lot covers 6,400 square feet (590 m^{2}), with a frontage of 62.33 feet (19.00 m) on 44th Street and a depth of 109.67 feet (33 m). The Golden Theatre shares the city block with the Row NYC Hotel to the west. It adjoins six other theaters: the Bernard B. Jacobs, Gerald Schoenfeld, and Booth to the east; the Broadhurst and Shubert to the southeast; and the Majestic to the south. Other nearby structures include the Music Box Theatre and Imperial Theatre to the north; the New York Marriott Marquis to the northeast; One Astor Plaza to the east; and Sardi's restaurant, the Hayes Theater, and the St. James Theatre one block south.

The Golden is part of the largest concentration of Broadway theaters on a single block. The adjoining block of 45th Street is also known as George Abbott Way, and foot traffic on the street increases box-office totals for the theaters there. The Majestic, Masque (Golden), and Royale (Bernard B. Jacobs) theaters and the Lincoln Hotel (Row NYC Hotel) had all been developed concurrently. The site of all four buildings had previously occupied by twenty brownstone residences. The site was part of the Astor family estate from 1803 to 1922, when it was sold to Henry Claman. The plots collectively measured 200 feet (61 m) wide along Eighth Avenue, 240 feet (73 m) along 44th Street, and 250 feet (76 m) along 45th Street.

== Design ==
The Golden Theatre, originally the Theatre Masque, was designed by Herbert J. Krapp in the Spanish style and was constructed from 1926 to 1927 for the Chanin brothers. The theater is named after producer John Golden (1874–1955). It was part of an entertainment complex along with the Lincoln Hotel and the Majestic and Royale theaters, which were also designed by Krapp in a Spanish style. The Masque was designed to be the smallest theater in that complex, with about 800 seats. The Chanin Realty and Construction Company constructed all four structures. The Golden is operated by the Shubert Organization.

=== Facade ===
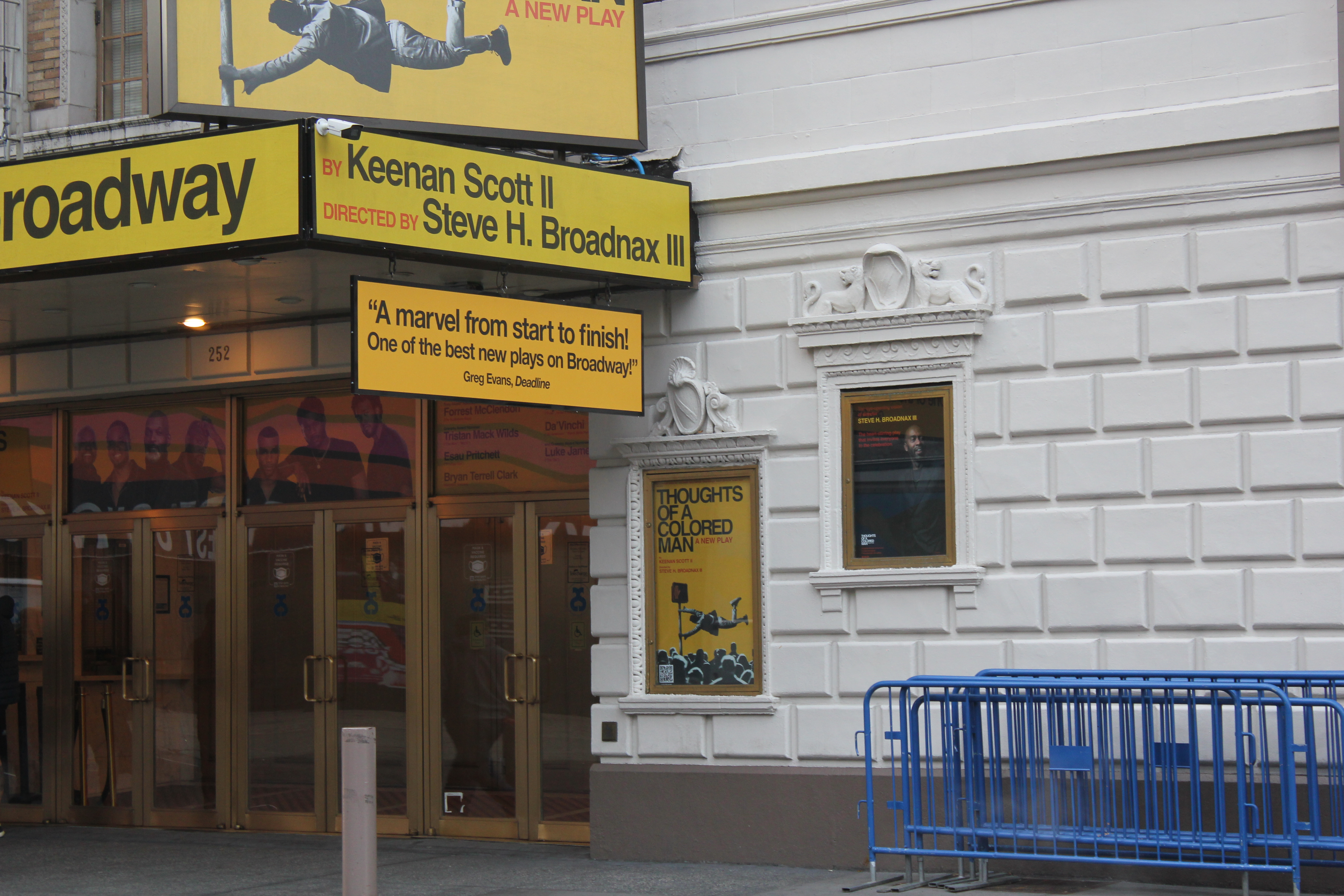
Rusticated terracotta base

The Golden Theatre's facade is symmetrically arranged. The ground floor is clad in rusticated blocks of terracotta above a granite water table. At ground level, the auditorium entrance includes four pairs of glass and aluminum doors. There is a modern bronze-framed sign board to the left, or east, of the doors. In addition, there are two display boxes on either side of the doors, with volutes on one of the boxes and stylized lions on the other box on either side. A plaque memorializing the theater's namesake is placed beside the doors. The entrance is topped by a marquee. A terracotta cornice and a band course run above the ground floor. The stage door is to the right, or east, of the main facade and is shared with the Majestic and Bernard B. Jacobs theaters.

The upper stories contain gold-colored, bonded Roman brick. The brick facade was designed to relate to the adjacent theaters and hotel. The center of the facade has a set of three arches spanning the second and third stories. The arches have molded Della Robbia foliate decoration, placed on terracotta piers that contain Corinthian-style capitals. On the second story, there are metal-framed casement windows with multiple panes, above which is a horizontal rope molding. The arches do not have windows on the third story. A similar, wider arcade exists on the neighboring Bernard B. Jacobs Theatre.

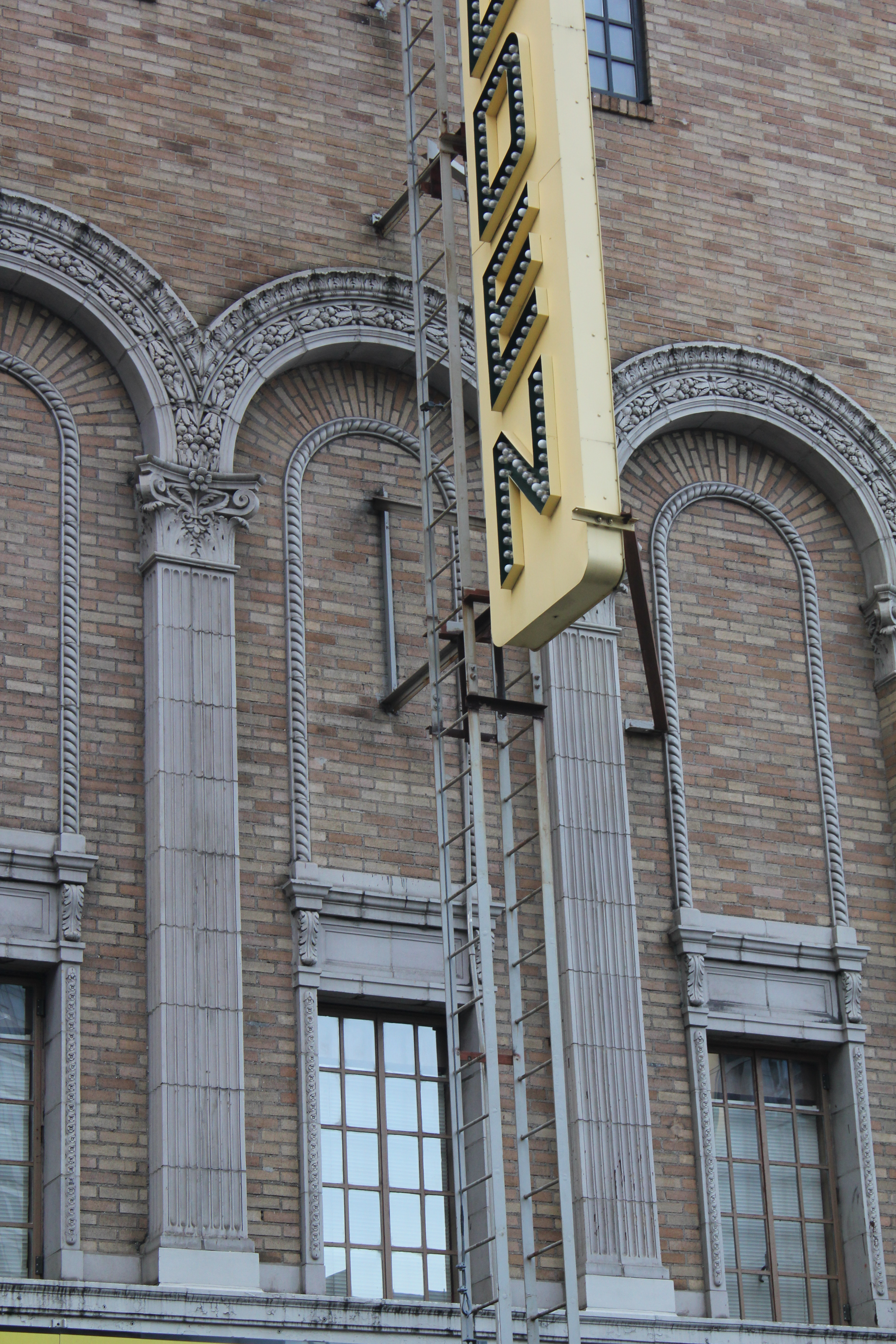
Arch detail

A sign with the theater's name is placed in front of the center arch. Toward the top of the facade, there are terracotta medallions depicting fictional beasts and foliate decorations. The parapet of the facade contains a terracotta balustrade. Above the center portion of the facade is a loggia, which in turn is placed on a balustrade and console brackets. The loggia has six single columns with decorative capitals, which support a cornice with modillions, as well as a Spanish-tile hip roof. The Golden's loggia complements a similar one on the stage-house wing of the Bernard B. Jacobs.

=== Auditorium ===
The Theatre Masque's original color scheme was red and blue, accented with gray, while the seat coverings were colored burnt orange. The interior is laid out in a similar Spanish style to the exterior. The layout was part of an effort by Irwin Chanin, one of the developers, to "democratize" the seating arrangement of the theater. The Golden was designed with a single balcony rather than the typical two, since Chanin had perceived the second balcony to be distant. The Chanin brothers wanted the three theaters' interior designs to be distinct while still adhering to a Spanish motif. Following a 2013 renovation, the theater has had an orange/red and blue/green color scheme, resembling the original.

The auditorium has an orchestra level, one balcony, and a stage behind the proscenium arch. The auditorium's width is greater than its depth, and the space is designed with plaster decorations in high relief. According to the Shubert Organization, the auditorium has 802 seats; meanwhile, Playbill cites 787 seats and The Broadway League cites 805 seats. The physical seats are divided into 465 seats in the orchestra, 110 at the front of the balcony, and 227 at the rear of the balcony. The Golden does not have boxes. There are restrooms and drinking fountains below the orchestra. An article from 1927 noted that the theater had 800 seats, which were slightly wider than seats in typical Broadway theaters of the time.

==== Seating areas ====
The rear of the orchestra contains doors from the ticket lobby, which leads to a promenade behind a modern wall. There are decorative exit signs above the doorways, which are at the center of the rear wall. The orchestra floor is raked, and the eastern wall is curved inward due to the presence of the Bernard B. Jacobs Theatre next door. The orchestra and its promenade contain walls with rough stucco blocks, and there are lighting sconces mounted onto the walls. Two staircases lead between the orchestra and the balcony. The orchestra level is wheelchair-accessible, but there are no elevators to the balcony. On either side of the front section of the orchestra, there are pointed arches with two pairs of doors. The doors are flanked by twisting columns and contain decorative exit-sign frames above them. There are also shields on the walls, high above the arches. The doorways originally had red velour curtains, which were restored during a 2013 renovation.

The balcony level is divided into front and rear sections by an aisle halfway across its depth, where ornate metal railings surround the staircases. The front section curves forward toward the walls and contains decorative metal balustrades. As at the orchestra level, the walls contain lighting sconces. The walls consist of paneled stucco blocks with low relief Moorish designs. There are arched doorways with exit doors at the front of the balcony. Above the wall is a geometric frieze, which forms the wall's cornice. Geometric-patterned panels are placed along the front and underside of the balcony. Lights have been installed in front of the balcony.

==== Other design features ====
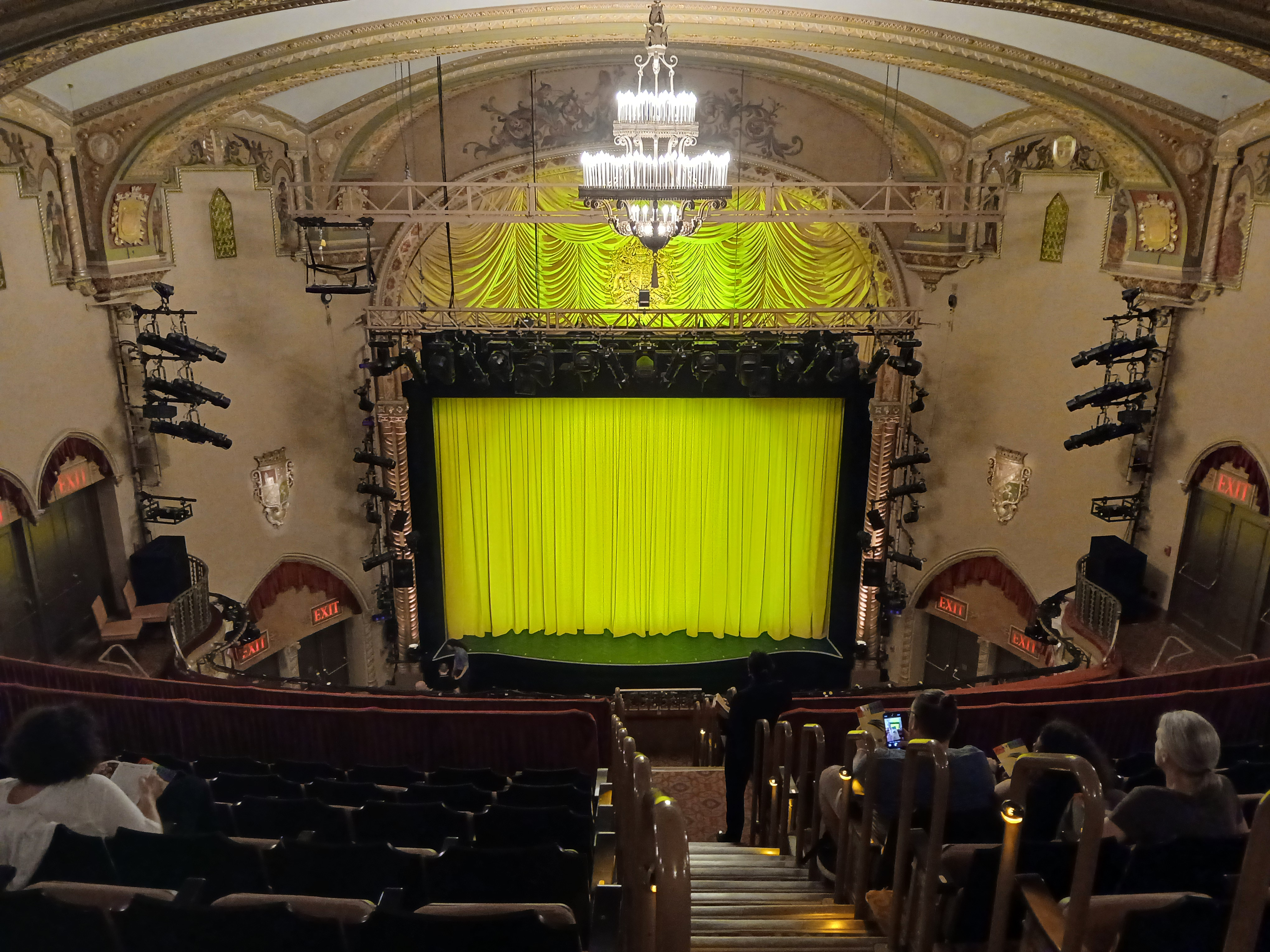
View from the rear of the balcony, looking toward the proscenium arch. The ceiling is divided by arched ribs, which are supported by corbels on each wall.

Next to the arched exits at orchestra level is an elliptical proscenium arch. The archway is flanked by a pair of twisted columns, above which are colonettes that rise to the imposts of the arch. There is a band with geometric patterns along the arch itself. The coved ceiling is divided into sections by arched ribs, which separate the auditorium into sections. The arches are supported by corbels on each wall, with twisting colonettes beside each corbel, while the ribs themselves have low-relief cameos, shields, and geometric patterns. A frieze with geometric patterns runs just below the ceiling. At the rear of the auditorium, the ceiling has a flat surface with a technical booth surrounded by grilles. The depth of the auditorium to the proscenium is 24 feet 9 inches (7.54 m), while the depth to the front of the stage is 27 feet 5 inches (8.36 m).

== History ==
Times Square became the epicenter for large-scale theater productions between 1900 and the Great Depression. During the 1900s and 1910s, many theaters in Midtown Manhattan were developed by the Shubert brothers, one of the major theatrical syndicates of the time. The Chanin brothers developed another grouping of theaters in the mid-1920s. Though the Chanins largely specialized in real estate rather than theaters, Irwin Chanin had become interested in theater when he was an impoverished student at the Cooper Union. He subsequently recalled that he had been "humiliated" by having to use a separate door whenever he bought cheap seats in an upper balcony level. By October 1926, the Chanins had decided to construct and operate a theatrical franchise "in New York and half a dozen other large cities in the United States". Herbert Krapp had already designed the 46th Street, Biltmore, and Mansfield theaters for the Chanins in 1925 and 1926.

=== Development and early years ===
==== Chanin operation ====
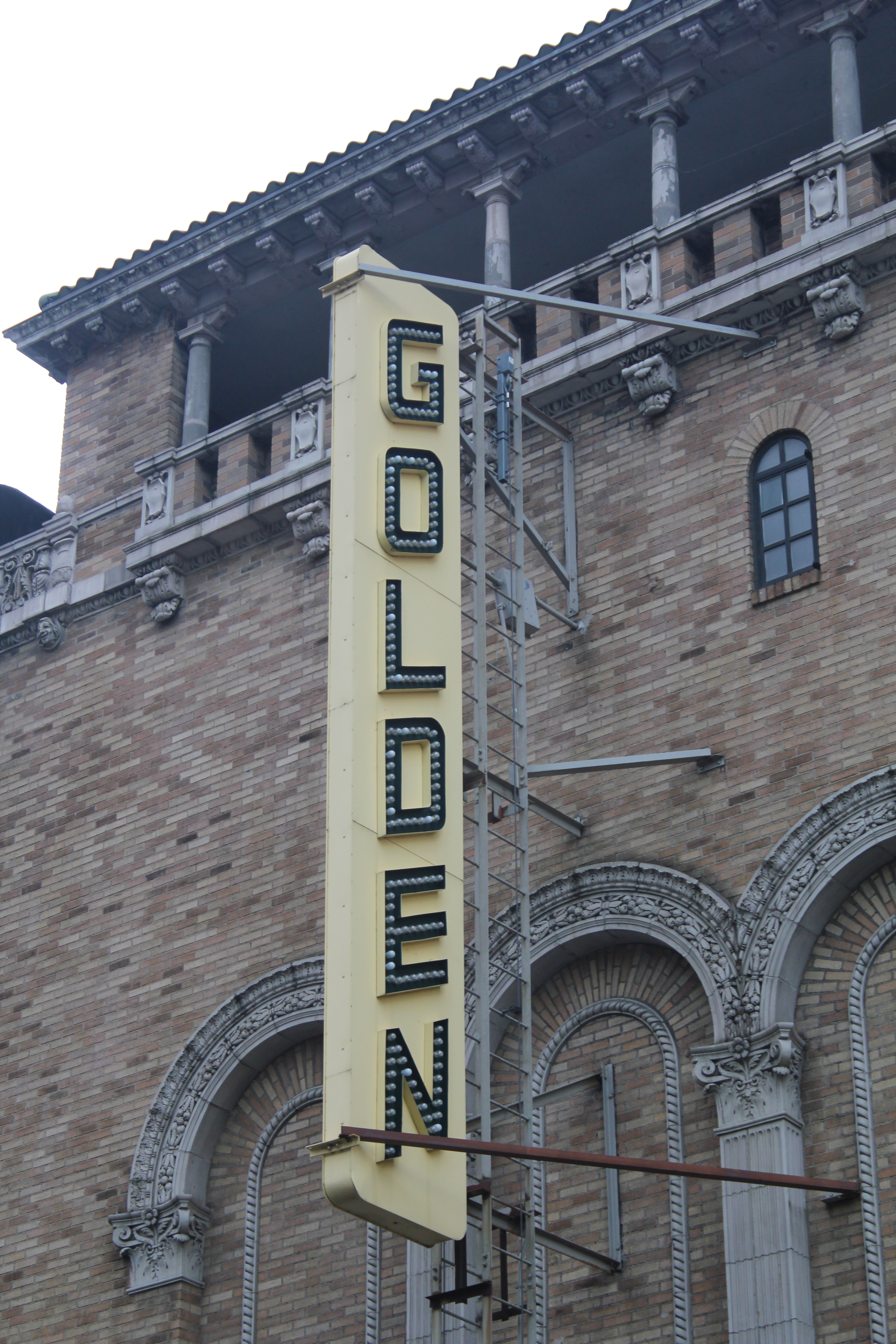
Sign with the Golden Theatre's name

The Chanin brothers had acquired the Klaman site in May 1925. The Chanins planned to build a hotel on Eighth Avenue and three theaters on the side streets. In March 1926, Krapp filed plans with the New York City Department of Buildings for the hotel and theaters, which were projected to cost $4.5 million. Local news media reported that there would be a large theater on 44th Street and a medium-sized theater and a small theater on 45th Street. (Note: Billboard magazine reported that the large and medium theaters would be on 44th Street, while the small theater would be on 45th Street.) The brownstones on the site were razed starting in May, and the site was cleared by the next month. That July, the Chanin brothers received a $7.5 million loan for the four developments from S. W. Straus & Co. Irwin Chanin launched a competition the same month, asking the public to suggest names for the three theaters. The names of the three theaters were announced in December 1926. The large theater became the Majestic; the mid-sized theater, the Royale; and the small theater, the Masque. The following month, the Chanins gave A. L. Erlanger exclusive control over bookings at the three new theaters and their five existing houses.

The Theatre Masque opened on February 24, 1927, with the play Puppets of Passion. The Masque was the second of the three new Chanin theaters to open. (Note: The Royale opened on January 11, 1927, and the Majestic opened on March 28. The Chanin project was completed in January 1928 with the opening of the Lincoln Hotel.) The opening of the Majestic, Masque, and Royale signified the westward extension of the traditional Broadway theater district, as well as an expansion of the Chanins' theatrical developments. Each of the Chanin theaters was intended for a different purpose: the 1,800-seat Majestic for "revues and light operas", the 1,200-seat Royale for "musical comedies", and the 800-seat Masque for "intimate" plays. The Chanin brothers were especially optimistic about the Masque, which was the closest of their theaters to the new Eighth Avenue subway line. Brooks Atkinson of The New York Times said the "Theatre Masque is pleasing and comfortable", while Burns Mantle of the New York Daily News said that he "liked particularly the curtain and the carpet". However, both men disliked Puppets of Passion, which flopped after twelve performances.

The Masque mostly hosted flops in its first two years. Puppets of Passion was followed by The Comic, which lasted just 15 performances, then by a revival of the Gilbert and Sullivan operetta Patience, which ran a similarly short 16 performances. In August 1927, Robert Milton leased the Masque for several years. The rest of 1927 was taken up by three short-running productions: Revelry, The King Can Do No Wrong, and Venus. The Masque fared not much better in 1928, when it hosted eight productions. Relations, a comedy by Edward Clark, was the only production in 1928 to run more than 100 performances, though Scarlet Fox and Young Love both came close. In July 1929, the Shubert brothers bought the Chanin brothers' half-ownership stakes in the Majestic, Masque, and Royale theaters for a combined $1.8 million. In exchange, the Shuberts sold a parcel of land on the Upper West Side to the Chanins, who bought several adjacent lots and developed the Century apartment building there. The Masque's first major hit was Rope's End in 1929, subsequently adapted into the Alfred Hitchcock film Rope. John Drinkwater's Bird in Hand premiered at the Masque that December, and it relocated within a month, eventually playing 500 performances.

==== 1930s and early 1940s ====
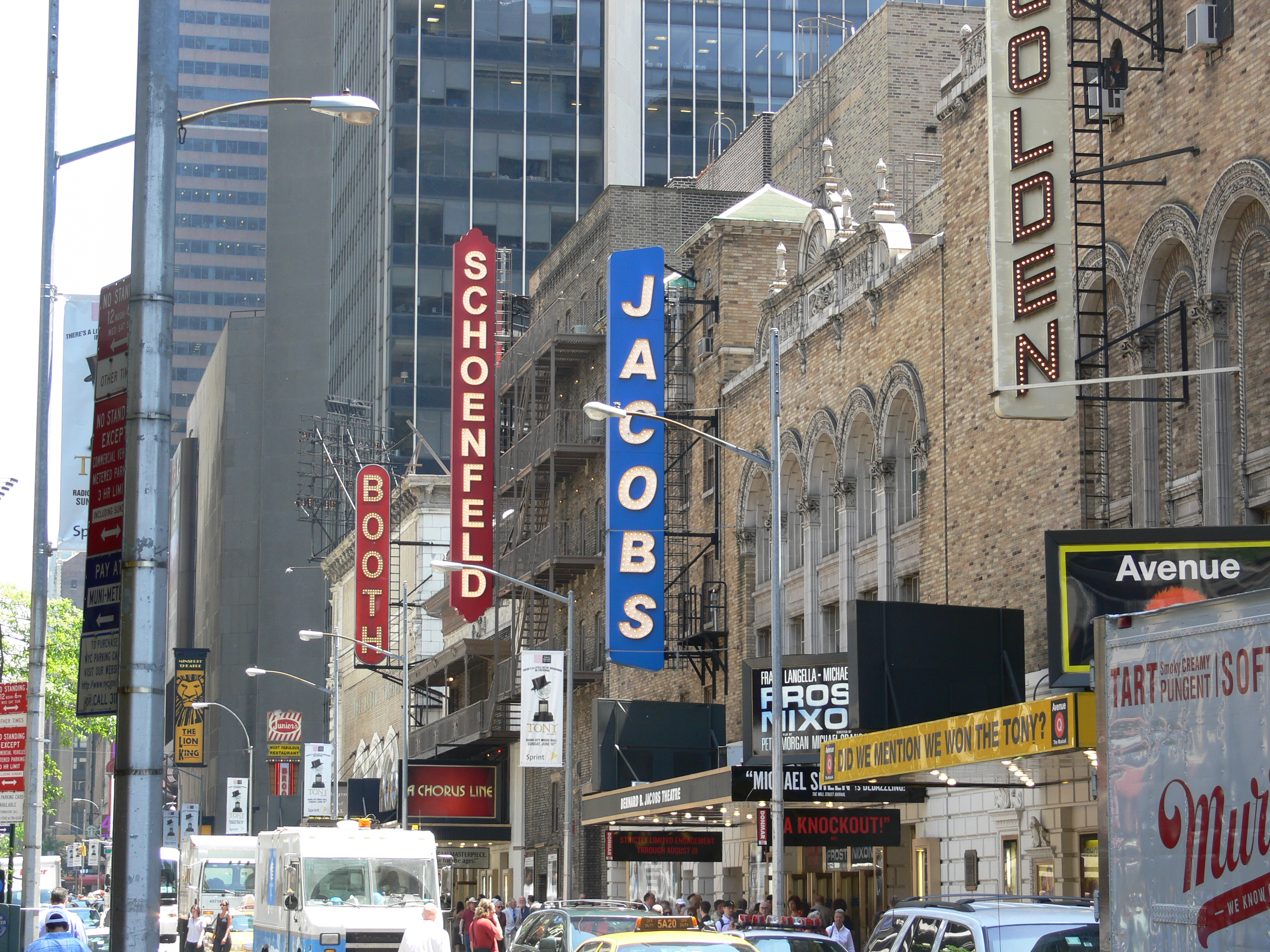
The Booth, Schoenfeld (Plymouth), Bernard B. Jacobs (Royale), and Golden (Masque) theaters from left to right

The Shuberts obtained the exclusive rights to operate the Masque in 1930, though the productions of that decade largely flopped. The first production of that year was a transfer of Martin Flavin's hit Broken Dishes, which had transferred from the Ritz Theatre. Also in 1930, the Masque presented Frances Goodrich and Albert Hackett's play Up Pops the Devil, with 146 performances. It was succeeded the next year by the DuBose Heyward drama Brass Ankle; a short run of The Venetian; and Norman Krasna's comedy Louder, Please. The original romance Goodbye Again, with Osgood Perkins, opened in 1932 and ran for 212 performances. Tobacco Road, another eventual hit, premiered at the Masque in 1933 and relocated the next month. The Masque's other successes of the mid-1930s included Post Road in 1934, Laburnum Grove in 1935, and Russet Mantle in 1936, all of which had over 100 performances.

The Broadway theater industry declined during the Great Depression, and the Majestic, Masque, and Royale were auctioned in November 1936 to satisfy a $2 million mortgage against the theaters. A representative of the Shubert family bought the rights to operate the theaters for $700,000, but the Bankers Securities Corporation retained a half interest. The Holmeses of Baker Street, which opened in December 1936, was the last show to be produced at the Masque before the theater changed names. At the end of the month, producer John Golden leased the Masque, with plans to renovate the theater and rename it after himself. The name "John Golden Theatre" had previously been applied to the neighboring Royale in 1934, (Note: The "John Golden Theatre" name had first been given to a theater on 58th Street, which opened in 1926.) but Golden had lost the right to operate the Royale in the 1936 auction. The Theatre Masque became the John Golden Theatre on January 26, 1937, and the flop And Now Goodbye became the first production in the newly renamed theater the next week.

The Golden continued to host flops after its renaming. One especially short run was Curtain Call in 1937, which had four performances before closing. The Golden's next hit was Paul Vincent Carroll's Shadow and Substance, which opened in 1938 and ran for 206 performances. Another play by Carroll, The White Steed, was moderately successful after relocating to the Golden in 1939. A major hit opened in 1941 with the premiere of Angel Street, which ran nearly 1,300 performances over the next three years. Angel Street became the Golden's longest-running production, despite initial expectations of failure: only three days' worth of playbills were ordered for the initial run. It was followed in 1944 by Rose Franken's comedy Soldier's Wife, which had a successful run of 255 performances.

=== Later Shubert operation ===
==== Mid-1940s to 1960s ====
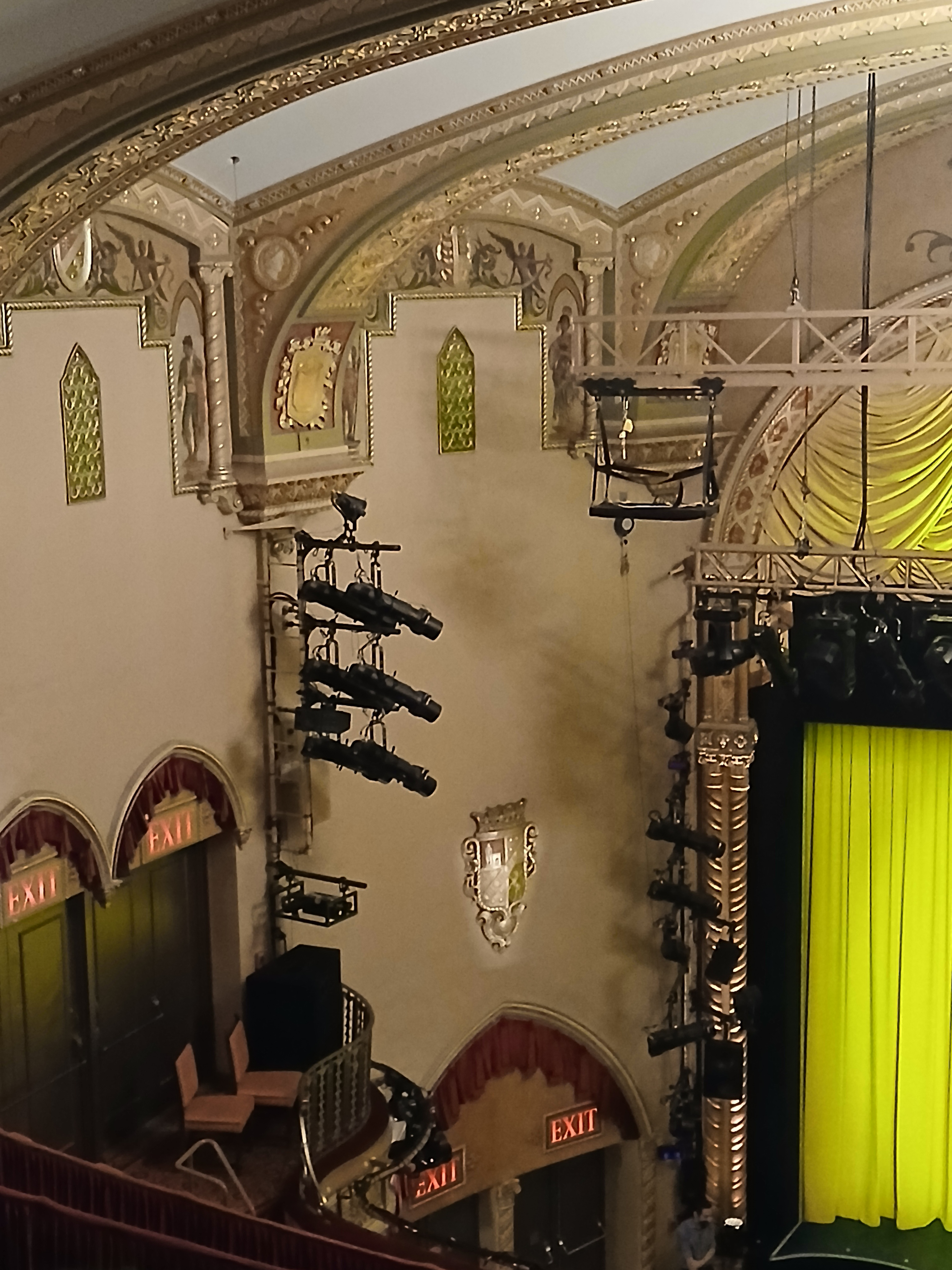
Decorative details on the front left-hand wall, including emergency exits

The Shubert brothers bought the Majestic, Golden (Masque), and Royale theaters from the Bankers Securities Corporation in 1945, giving the family full ownership of these theaters. During the mid-1940s, the Golden presented numerous mediocre plays, including The Rich Full Life and Dunnigan's Daughter in 1945, as well as January Thaw and I Like It Here in 1946. In July 1946, the Golden was leased for five years to the Super Cinema Corporation. The lessee planned to show Italian films there, but the Golden instead showed the British film Henry V for nearly a year. The theater was used as a cinema until February 1948, when Maurice Chevalier opened a solo show there. The Golden then hosted several short-run shows with live performers. The cinema's lease did not expire until 1950. That year, the Golden hosted a moderate hit, The Velvet Glove with Grace George and Walter Hampden, as well as the flop Let's Make an Opera, which had five performances. Other works during the early 1950s included The Green Bay Tree; To Dorothy, A Son; and The Fourposter.

Victor Borge's one-man show Comedy in Music, which opened in 1953 and ran 849 performances during the next three years. By sharp contrast, even though Bert Lahr and E. G. Marshall were acclaimed for their performances in the 1956 play Waiting for Godot, it had only 59 performances. The same year, Menasha Skulnik starred in Uncle Willie during its 141-performance run. Look Back in Anger was also a minor hit when it was staged at the Golden for six months in 1958. Starting in the late 1950s, the Golden hosted numerous revues with two performers. First among them was A Party with Betty Comden and Adolph Green, featuring the duo of Betty Comden and Adolph Green, who premiered in 1958 and returned in 1959. Also presented in 1959 were The Billy Barnes Revue, as well as At the Drop of a Hat with Michael Flanders and Donald Swann. An Evening With Mike Nichols and Elaine May premiered in 1960 and ran for 306 performances, followed the next year by An Evening with Yves Montand.

The Golden hosted a transfer of Sunday in New York with Robert Redford in 1962. Beyond the Fringe premiered later that year, ultimately running over 600 performances. Victor Borge again played the Golden in 1964 with 192 performances of his solo Comedy in Music, Opus 2. This was followed in 1966 by the South African revue Wait a Minim!, which ran more than twice as long, with 457 performances. For the most part, the Golden's other productions during the 1960s were short-lived. Seven productions followed Wait a Minim! in the late 1960s, including After the Rain and Brief Lives in 1967.

==== 1970s and 1980s ====
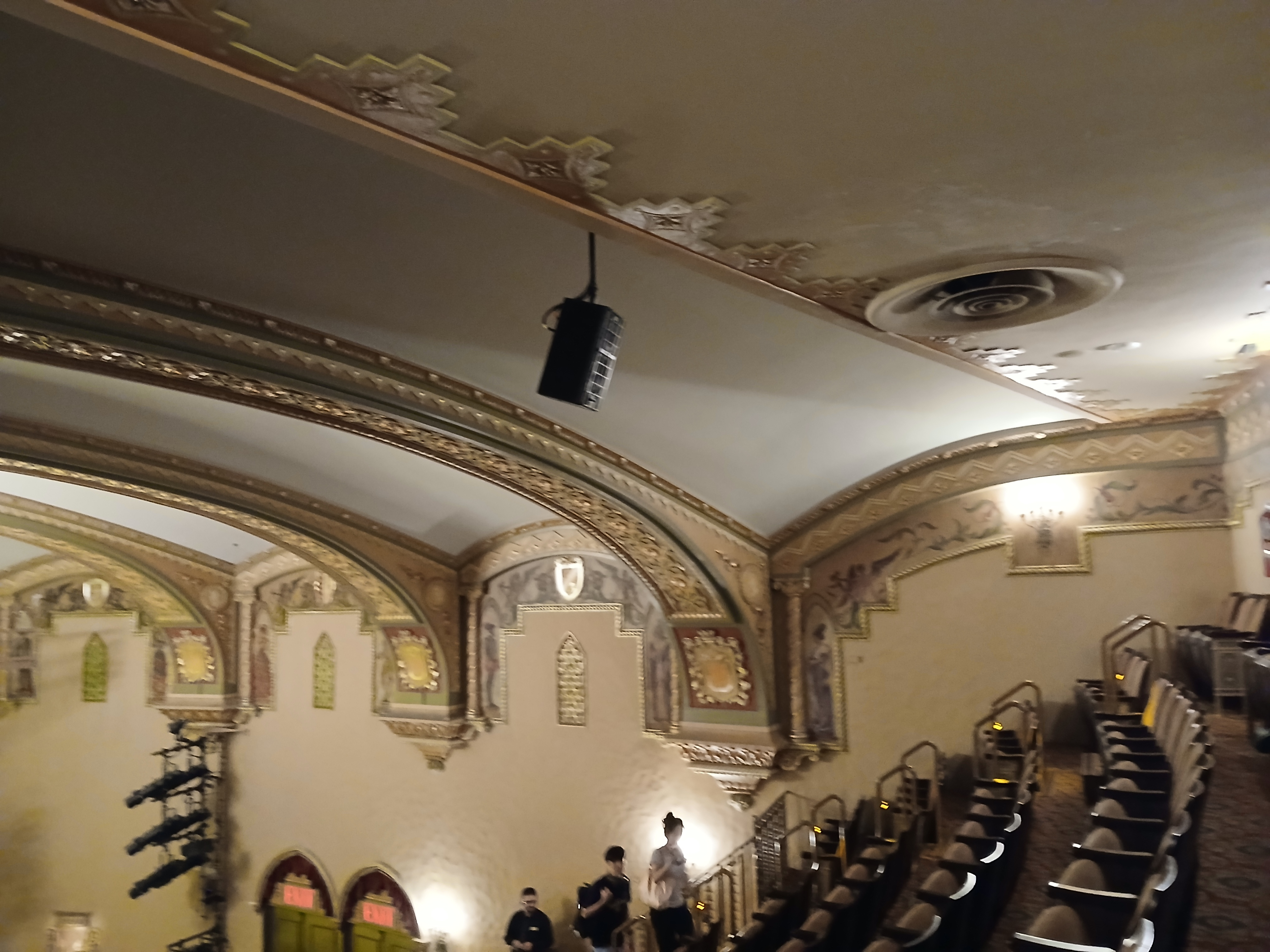
Seating in the upper balcony

The first success in the 1970s was Bob and Ray—The Two and Only, a comedy that starred Bob Elliott and Ray Goulding for 158 performances. The following year, the off-Broadway hit You're a Good Man, Charlie Brown ran at the Golden, though its 32-performance Broadway run was far shorter than its off-Broadway run. In 1972, The Public Theater presented David Rabe's Sticks and Bones, starring Elizabeth Wilson and Tom Aldredge for 245 performances. Sammy Cahn featured in the revue Words and Music in 1974, while Shirley Knight appeared the next year in Kennedy's Children. Two major productions opened in 1977: Dirty Linen & New-Found-Land, a pair of plays by Tom Stoppard, and The Gin Game, a Pulitzer Prize-winning tragicomedy by Donald L. Coburn with 517 performances. By contrast, Murder at the Howard Johnson's was a notable failure with only four performances in 1979.

In 1980, the Golden hosted a short revival of Watch on the Rhine, followed by the premiere of the double bill A Day in Hollywood / A Night in the Ukraine. Hollywood/Ukraine relocated in June 1980 and the Golden underwent a renovation. The theater reopened that October with Tintypes, a revue that transferred from off-Broadway. The following year, the Golden hosted another off-Broadway transfer, the Pulitzer-winning Crimes of the Heart, which ran for 535 performances. Two other Pulitzer-winning productions were then staged at the Golden: 'night, Mother in 1983 and Glengarry Glen Ross. This set a record for the number of Pulitzer-winning productions on Broadway, with four such productions in seven years. A revival of Athol Fugard's Blood Knot opened at the Golden in 1985, which was followed in 1987 by Stepping Out and All My Sons. The New York International Festival of the Arts premiered Juno and the Paycock on Broadway in 1988, and Eastern Standard premiered the next year, featuring Richard Greenberg in his Broadway debut. During the 1980s, the Shuberts renovated the Golden as part of a restoration program for their Broadway theaters.

The New York City Landmarks Preservation Commission (LPC) had started considering protecting the John Golden Theatre as an official city landmark in 1982, with discussions continuing over the next several years. The LPC designated both the facade and the interior as landmarks on November 17, 1987. This was part of the LPC's wide-ranging effort in 1987 to grant landmark status to Broadway theaters. The New York City Board of Estimate ratified the designations in March 1988. The Shuberts, the Nederlanders, and Jujamcyn collectively sued the LPC in June 1988 to overturn the landmark designations of 22 theaters, including the Golden, on the merit that the designations severely limited the extent to which the theaters could be modified. The lawsuit was escalated to the New York Supreme Court and the Supreme Court of the United States, but these designations were ultimately upheld in 1992.

==== 1990s to present ====
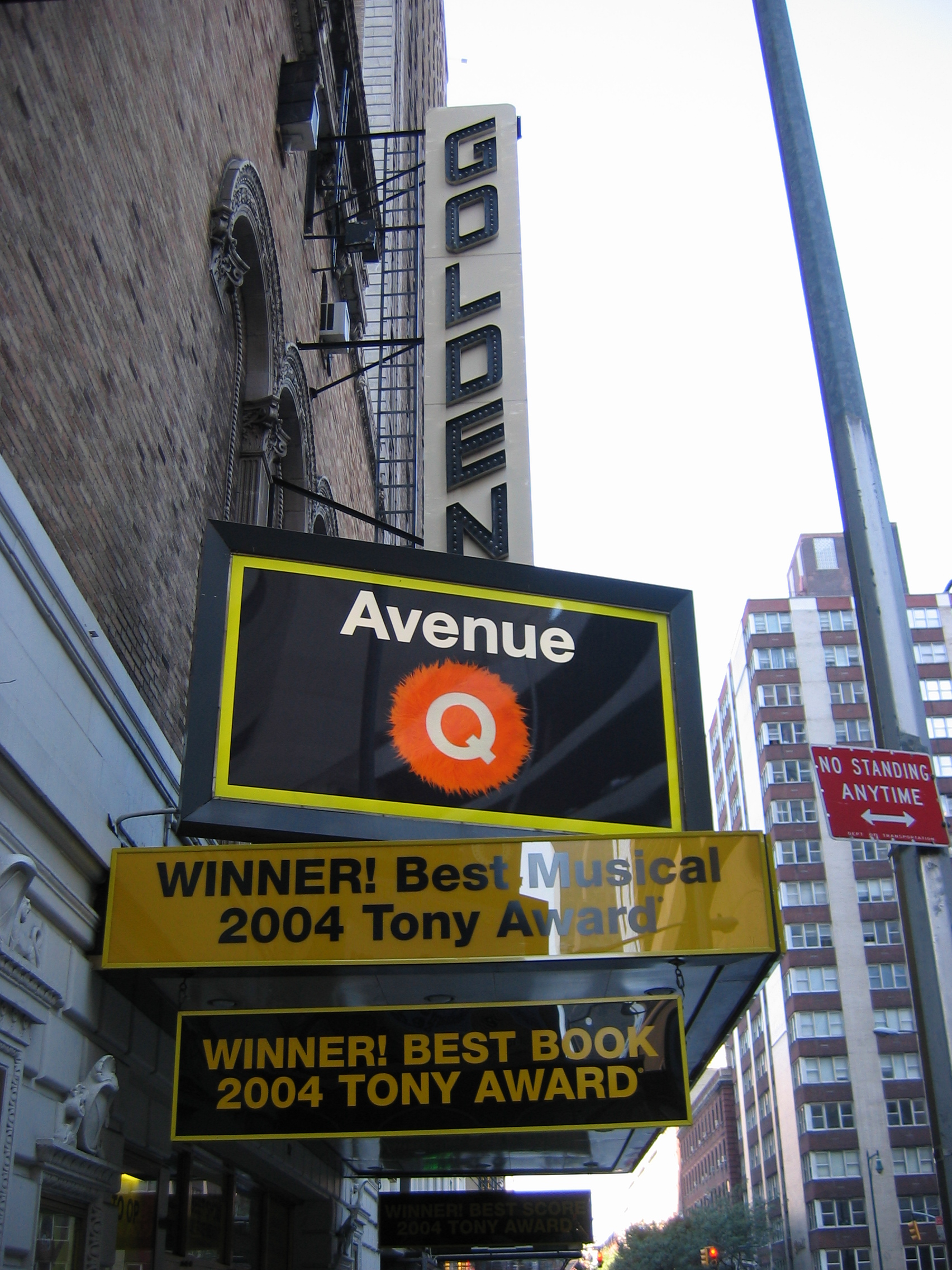
While showing Avenue Q

In 1990, Michael Feinstein performed at the Golden with his show Concert: Piano and Voice. This was followed by Falsettos (1992), which had 487 performances, and by the drama Mixed Emotions (1993) with Katherine Helmond, which had 55 performances. The comedian Jackie Mason subsequently starred at the Golden in Politically Incorrect, which opened in 1994 and ran for over 340 performances. It was followed the next year by Master Class, which ran for about 600 performances through 1997. Also successful was a limited engagement of The Chairs in 1998, as well as a transfer of the off-Broadway production Side Man later that year, which then ran until 1999. Mason returned at the end of 1999 for Much Ado About Everything.

The first hit of the 2000s was Stones in His Pockets in 2001, which ran for 198 performances. This was followed by The Goat, or Who Is Sylvia? in 2002, as well as Vincent in Brixton in 2003. As part of a settlement with the United States Department of Justice in 2003, the Shuberts agreed to improve disabled access at their 16 landmarked Broadway theaters, including the Golden. The musical Avenue Q, transferred from off-Broadway, opened at the Golden on July 31, 2003, and became a major hit, recovering its production cost within a year. By the time Avenue Q transferred back off-Broadway in 2009, it had become the Golden's longest-running production with over 2,500 performances. Subsequently, the Golden hosted Oleanna in late 2009; Red and Driving Miss Daisy in 2010; The Normal Heart and Seminar in 2011; and Anarchist in 2012. The Shuberts hired Francesca Russo to renovate the Golden Theatre in 2013. Russo's company removed many later modifications, and they also restored the original appearance using historical pictures, as well as details inspired by structures such as the Taj Mahal.

The Golden Theatre continued to host small productions in the mid-2010s. These included Vanya and Sonia and Masha and Spike and A Time to Kill in 2013; Mothers and Sons and A Delicate Balance in 2014, Skylight and a revival of The Gin Game in 2015; and Eclipsed and The Encounter in 2016. Subsequently, the Golden hosted A Doll's House, Part 2 in 2017; Three Tall Women and The Waverly Gallery in 2018; and Hillary and Clinton and Slave Play in 2019. The theater closed on March 12, 2020, due to the COVID-19 pandemic. The production Hangmen, which was supposed to open in mid-2020, did not officially open at that time due to the pandemic. The Golden Theatre reopened October 13, 2021, with performances of Thoughts of a Colored Man, which closed at the end of the year. This allowed Hangmen to be booked for a limited run from April to June 2022, followed by Topdog/Underdog for a limited run from October 2022 to January 2023. The play Prima Facie was staged at the Golden from April to July 2023; it was followed by The Shark Is Broken from August to November 2023. Subsequently the immensely successful play-with-music Stereophonic transferred from off-Broadway to run at the Golden from April 2024 to January 2025 in a twice-extended run wherein it would become the most nominated play in Tony Awards history, a record it still holds to this day. This would be followed by the transfer of the British award-winning musical Operation Mincemeat in February 2025, in a heftily extended run that, as of June 2026, is still ongoing.

== Notable productions ==
Productions are listed by the year of their first performance. This list only includes Broadway shows; it does not include films screened at the theater.

Notable productions at the theater
Opening year	Name	Refs.
1927	Patience	
1929	Rope's End	
1931	The Venetian	
1931	Louder, Please	
1933	Tobacco Road	
1935	Eden End	
1938	Shadow and Substance	
1938	Lightnin'	
1939	The White Steed	
1941	Angel Street	
1948	Maurice Chevalier in an evening of Songs and Impressions	
1949	Goodbye, My Fancy	
1950	Let's Make an Opera	
1951	The Green Bay Tree	
1951	To Dorothy, A Son	
1952	The Fourposter	
1953	Comedy in Music	
1956	Someone Waiting	
1956	Waiting for Godot	
1957	The Potting Shed	
1957	Monique	ref name="NYCL p. 34"/>
1958	Look Back in Anger	
1958	Epitaph for George Dillon	
1958	A Party with Betty Comden and Adolph Green	
1959	Requiem for a Nun	
1959	The Billy Barnes Revue	
1959	At the Drop of a Hat	
1960	An Evening With Mike Nichols and Elaine May	
1961	An Evening with Yves Montand	
1962	Sunday in New York	
1962	Beyond the Fringe	
1966	Wait a Minim!	
1967	After the Rain	
1967	Brief Lives	
1968	Carry Me Back to Morningside Heights	
1968	The Exercise	
1970	Bob and Ray—The Two and Only	
1971	You're a Good Man, Charlie Brown	
1972	Sticks and Bones	
1975	Hughie and Duet	(Note: Hughie and Duet performed in repertory.)
1975	P. S. Your Cat Is Dead!	
1975	Kennedy's Children	
1976	Going Up	
1977	Dirty Linen & New-Found-Land	
1977	The Gin Game	
1979	Murder at the Howard Johnson's	
1980	Watch on the Rhine	
1980	A Day in Hollywood / A Night in the Ukraine	
1980	Tintypes	
1981	Crimes of the Heart	
1983	'night, Mother	
1984	Glengarry Glen Ross	
1985	Blood Knot	
1987	Stepping Out	
1987	All My Sons	
1988	Juno and the Paycock	
1989	Eastern Standard	
1992	Falsettos	
1995	Master Class	
1998	The Chairs	
1998	Side Man	
2001	Stones in His Pockets	
2002	The Goat, or Who is Sylvia?	
2003	Vincent in Brixton	
2003	Avenue Q	
2009	Oleanna	
2010	Red	
2010	Driving Miss Daisy	
2011	The Normal Heart	
2011	Seminar	
2013	Vanya and Sonia and Masha and Spike	
2013	A Time to Kill	
2014	Mothers and Sons	
2014	A Delicate Balance	
2015	Skylight	
2015	The Gin Game	
2016	Eclipsed	
2017	A Doll's House, Part 2	
2018	Three Tall Women	
2018	The Waverly Gallery	
2019	Hillary and Clinton	
2019	Slave Play	
2021	Thoughts of a Colored Man	
2022	Hangmen	(Note: Hangmen only had previews in 2020 due to the COVID-19 pandemic. Playbill classifies the 2020 and 2022 productions separately, while the Broadway League originally considered these to be the same production.)
2022	Topdog/Underdog	
2023	Prima Facie	
2023	The Shark Is Broken	
2024	Stereophonic	
2025	Operation Mincemeat	

== See also ==
- List of Broadway theatres
- List of New York City Designated Landmarks in Manhattan from 14th to 59th Streets
