= Miss Littlewood =

- Music: Sam Kenyon
- Lyrics: Sam Kenyon
- Book: Sam Kenyon
- Basis: The life of Joan Littlewood
- Premiere: 3 July 2018: Swan Theatre, Stratford-upon-Avon
- Productions: 2018 Stratford-upon-Avon

Miss Littlewood is a stage musical with music, lyrics and book by Sam Kenyon.

It is based on the life of theatre director Joan Littlewood and the formation of the Theatre Workshop which found residency at Theatre Royal Stratford East.

== Production history ==
=== World premiere: Stratford-upon-Avon (2018) ===
The musical was produced by the Royal Shakespeare Company and made its world premiere at the Swan Theatre in Stratford-upon-Avon on 3 July 2018 (with previews from 22 June) for a limited 6 week run until 4 August 2018. The production was directed by Erica Whyman with design by Tom Piper, lighting design by Charles Balfour, musical supervision and orchestrated by Sarah Travis, musical direction by Tarek Merchant, sound by Jonathan Ruddick and movement by Lucy Hind. The musical was developed in collaboration with Theatre Royal Stratford East. The full cast was announced on 13 April 2018.

The playtext was published by Samuel French Limited on 21 June 2018. A cast recording, featuring 13 tracks and produced by Gareth Cousins, was recorded at the Swan Theatre during the musical's preview period and is available from the RSC shop and Spotify

== Cast and characters ==
Character	Stratford-Upon-Avon
Character	2018
Joan Littlewood	Clare Burt
Sister Mary/Rosalie Williams/Reporter	Daisy Badger
Robert Littlewood/Jimmie Miller/Cedric Price	Greg Barnett
Kate Littlewood/Beattie/Shelagh Delaney	Laura Elsworthy
Gerry Raffles	Solomon Israel
Nellie	Natasha Lewis
Gielgud's Macbeth/Howard Goorney/Murray Melvin/Bellboy	Tam Williams
Joan 1/Pearl Turner/Barbara Young/Lionel Bart/Barbara/Barbara Windsor	Emily Johnstone
Joan 2/Frank Norman	Aretha Ayeh
Joan 3/Avis Bunnage	Sophia Nomvete
Sister Gertrude/Woman with pears/Jean Newlove/Joan 4	Sandy Foster
Sister Susannah/Nick/Archie Harding/John Bury/Joan 5/Victor Spinetti	Amanda Hadingue
Caroline Emily/Hal Prince/Joan 6	Dawn Hope

== Musical numbers ==
Act I

- "Joan All Alone" - Joan Littlewood and Joan 1
- "The Trouble With Theatre" - Joan 1 and Women
- "My Father's Eyes" - Joan 1, Joan 2 and Company
- "Paris Is A Woman" - Joan 2 and Company
- "The Trouble With Theatre: RADA Reprise" - Joan 2
- "The Wanderer's Lament" - Jimmie Miller and Company
- "Goodbye" - Joan 2 and Women
- "The Theatre Workshop Story 1: Fuente Ovejuna" - Company
- "The Theatre Workshop Story 2: Last Edition" - Company
- "Now" - Joan Littlewood and Gerry Raffles
- "The Theatre Workshop Story 3: Uranium 235" - Company
- "Goodbye: Ormesby Reprise" - Joan Littlewood, Joan 1, 2 and 3

Act II

- "In Stratford East" - Joan Littlewood, Joan 4, Company, Avis Bunnage and Gerry Raffles
- "Top Of The Morning" - Jimmie Miller
- "A Taste Of Honey" - Shelagh Delaney
- "A Taste Of Honey: Frank Norman Reprise" - Frank Norman and Lionel Bart
- "A Taste Of Honey: Hal Prince Reprise" - Hal Prince and Company
- "Change" - Joan Littlewood, Joan 1, 2, 3, 4 and 5, and Gerry Raffles
- "A Little Bit of Business" - Barbara Windsor
- "Where Have You Been All My Life?" - Joan 6 and Barbara Windsor
- "The Theatre Workshop Story 4: Oh What A Lovely War" - Company
- "Nothing Much Happened After That" - Joan Littlewood, Joan 1, 2, 3, 4, 5 and 6
- "A Decent Day" - Joan Littlewood and Company

=== Orchestrations ===
The production, orchestrated by Sarah Travis, uses 7 musicians, including 1 reed player (clarinet/bass clarinet/flute), 1 brass (trumpet), 2 strings (violin/viola and cello/double bass), a percussionist and 2 keyboards (keyboard/accordion and keyboard programming).
