= Inter-Action Centre =

London community centre building, 1971–2003

Coordinates: 51.548°N 0.148°W

The Inter-Action Centre was one of architect Cedric Price's few realized projects. The community centre, sited at Talacre Public Open Space in Kentish Town, in the London Borough of Camden, was commissioned in 1964 by Ed Berman and the Inter-Action Trust and built in 1971.

The Inter-Action Centre is particularly notable for having been one of the first buildings to make concrete the ideas of flexible architecture and impermanence. Price's body of work as a whole had a tremendous influence on the architecture profession, and the Inter-Action Centre helped realize the ambitions of his earlier, unbuilt Fun Palace (which had proposed the fusion of architecture and information technology, entertainment and educational activities) and Potteries Thinkbelt. It was constructed around an open framework into which modular, pre-fabricated elements could be inserted and removed according to need. It was essentially a building that could be reconfigured over time as its occupants' requirements evolved.

Often compared to Centre Pompidou and other high-tech buildings of the time, the Inter-Action Centre differed in being explicitly designed around a democratic approach to architecture.

Price had been working with, and was influenced by, cybernetician Gordon Pask and used the Inter-Action Centre as a way to present an architectural approach to second-order cybernetics. The Inter-Action Centre was architectural evidence that Price's radical and utopian agenda could be materialized in a built form with a clear social agenda, though there is also a view that the building showed that his goals were not quite realizable in the real world.

Price himself persuaded English Heritage not to list the building, and supported its demolition in 2003 because he believed it had fulfilled its purpose as a temporary commodity with a short lifespan.
