= Fun Palaces =

Cultural scheme in the United Kingdom

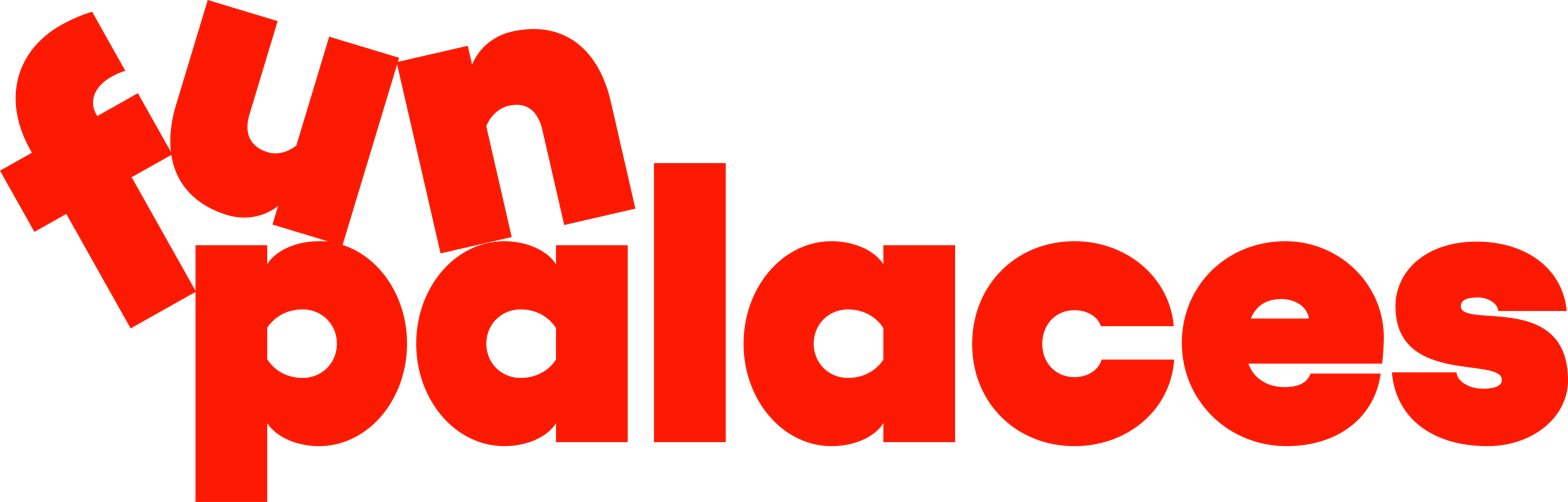
- Status: active
- Genre: community movement, grassroots, cultural democracy campaign
- Date: First weekend of October (Annual)
- Frequency: Annually
- Venue: United Kingdom
- Location: National
- Inaugurated: October 2014
- People: Joan Littlewood, Cedric Price, Stella Duffy
- Website: official website

Fun Palaces is a UK-based movement and campaign promoting cultural democracy through community-led participation in arts, science, and culture. It encourages people and groups to create their own free, hands-on events called Fun Palaces, run by and for local communities across the UK and internationally. The annual Weekend of Celebration, held on the first weekend of October, sees thousands of volunteers and grassroots organisations independently host Fun Palaces to share skills and creativity. The campaign challenges traditional ideas about culture and aims to make arts and sciences accessible to everyone, emphasising inclusivity and collective agency. Inspired by a concept developed by theatre director Joan Littlewood and architect Cedric Price in the 1960s, the modern Fun Palaces campaign was launched in 2014 by Stella Duffy and Sarah-Jane Rawlings.

== History ==
=== Original concept (1960s) ===
The idea for Fun Palaces originated in 1961 with theatre director Joan Littlewood and architect Cedric Price, who envisioned creating a single, flexible building where communities could come together to celebrate arts, science, and culture. Their original blueprint described a space where you could:

Choose what you want to do – or watch someone else doing it. Learn how to handle tools, paint, babies, machinery, or just listen to your favourite tune. Dance, talk or be lifted up to where you can see how other people make things work. Sit out over space with a drink and tune in to what's happening elsewhere in the city. Try starting a riot or beginning a painting – or just lie back and stare at the sky.

— Joan Littlewood

Inspired by pleasure gardens and working men's clubs, Littlewood and Price aimed to make culture, science, and education accessible to a broader section of society by creating a venue that encouraged both participation and performance. Despite interest, their plans faced significant obstacles: local authorities refused to donate land, and funding was not forthcoming, so the original Fun Palace was never built.

=== Unbuilt legacy and influence ===
Although the original Fun Palace was never constructed, its radical ideas had a lasting impact on architecture, cultural theory, and community practice. The concept's emphasis on flexible, participatory design (blurring the boundaries between learning, leisure, art, and science) anticipated later developments in interactive and user-driven architecture.

Elements of the Fun Palace vision were also realised in later projects by Cedric Price, such as the Inter-Action Centre (1971), and in experimental community events led by Littlewood, including the Stratford Fair (1975) and “Bubble City” (1968). Over time, the Fun Palace has become a major reference point in academic and architectural discourse, celebrated as a “landmark in 20th-century architectural thought” for its social ambition and innovative approach to public space.

The fact that the Fun Palace was never built has contributed to its enduring status as a provocative, utopian ideal in architectural and cultural debates.

== Contemporary movement ==
=== Modern revival (2013- present) ===
The Fun Palaces concept was revived in 2013, by writers and producers Stella Duffy and Sarah-Jane Rawlings, inspired by Joan Littlewood's centenary and a renewed interest in community-led culture. The new campaign invited communities, venues, and organisations across the United Kingdom - and later internationally - to create their own Fun Palaces. Since 2014, Fun Palaces has become an annual movement each October, with communities independently organising local, free events in a wide variety of spaces.

=== Leadership ===
In 2020, Kirsty Lothian and Makala Cheung were appointed as joint co-directors, reflecting the campaign's ongoing commitment to collaborative leadership and representation. In 2024, Amie Taylor became Director of Fun Palaces.

== Principles and ethos ==
Fun Palaces is grounded in cultural democracy, aiming to remove barriers between professionals and amateurs in arts and sciences. Events are locally organised, free to attend, and based on skill-sharing and participation rather than traditional performance or audience models. As Stella Duffy explains, "A Fun Palace is not a fete. It's not about coming along and having a lovely time. It's not audience development. It's saying to everybody—you can do this; you already do this. You are allowed to make art and science."

The campaign also seeks to address social isolation, increase wellbeing, and build stronger communities by encouraging intergenerational and cross-cultural connections. Its principles have been referenced in research on cultural democracy, community development, and participatory arts practice.

== Impact and evaluation ==
The campaign celebrated its tenth anniversary in 2023, and during that decade they have become a major force in the campaign for cultural democracy.

In 2023, Fun Palaces partnered with Dr. Katy Pilcher and the Centre for Cultural Value on the “Creative Voices, Activist Voices” research project, exploring how cultural participation can drive social change and empower grassroots activism within communities.

“The research has highlighted the importance for participants of what it means to ‘hand over’ your space – of levelling space from the outset, and how people carry this ethos into their wider community activities and activism.” - Dr. Katy Pilcher
