= Joan Littlewood =

English theatre director (1914–2002)

- Cover of Joan's Book: the autobiography of Joan Littlewood
- Born: Joan Maud Littlewood; 6 October 1914; Stockwell, London, England
- Died: 20 September 2002 (aged 87); London, England
- Occupation: Theatre director
- Years active: 1930–1975
- Spouse: Ewan MacColl (m. 1934; div. 1950)
- Partner(s): Gerry Raffles; Philippe de Rothschild

Joan Maud Littlewood (6 October 1914 – 20 September 2002) was an English pioneering theatre director, who has been referred to as "The Mother of Modern Theatre". She trained at the Royal Academy of Dramatic Art and is best known for her work in developing the Theatre Workshop. Her production of Oh, What a Lovely War! in 1963 was one of her more influential pieces.

Littlewood and her company lived and slept in the Theatre Royal while it was restored. Productions of The Alchemist and Richard II, the latter starring Harry H. Corbett in the title role, established the reputation of the company.

She also conceived and developed the concept of the Fun Palace, in collaboration with architect Cedric Price.

Miss Littlewood, a musical written about Littlewood by Sam Kenyon, was performed by the Royal Shakespeare Company in 2018.

== Early years ==
Littlewood was born in Stockwell, London, and was educated at La Retraite Convent School in Clapham Park. She trained as an actress at RADA, but left after an unhappy start and moved to Manchester in 1934, where she met folksinger Jimmie Miller, who later became known as Ewan MacColl. After joining his troupe, Theatre of Action, Littlewood and Miller soon were married. After a brief move to London, they returned to Manchester and set up the Theatre Union in 1936.

== Career ==
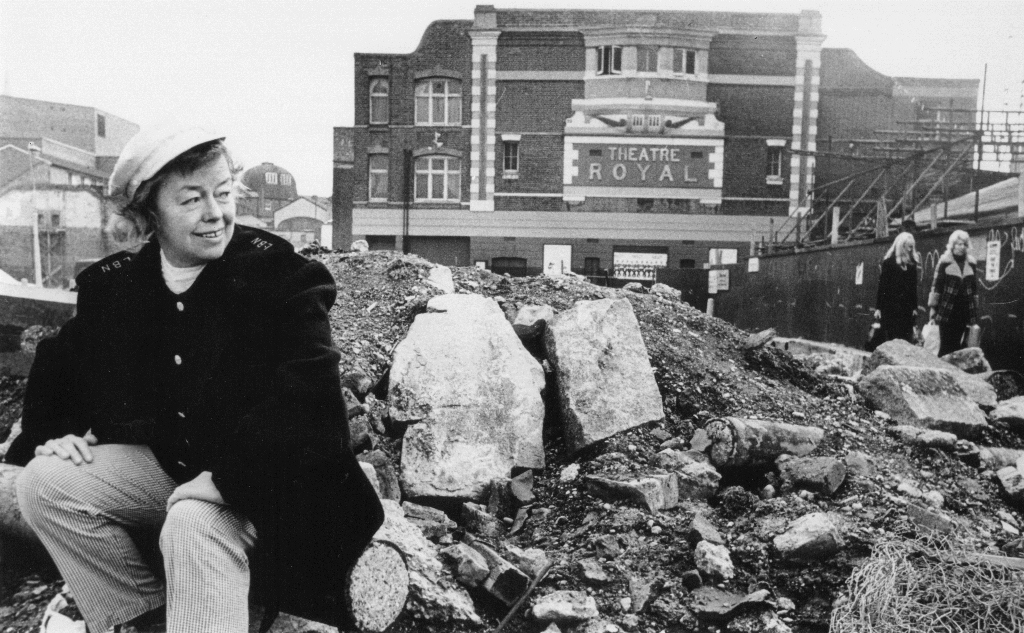
Joan Littlewood and the Theatre Royal

In 1941, Littlewood was banned from broadcasting on the BBC and her personnel file was marked by an MI5 officer as she was deemed a security risk. The ban was lifted two years later, when MI5 said she had broken off her association with the Communist Party. She was under surveillance by MI5 from 1939 until the 1950s.

In 1945, after the end of World War II, Littlewood, her husband the communist folk singer Ewan MacColl, and other Theatre Union members formed Theatre Workshop and registered it while staying at Ormesby Hall. The following eight years were spent touring. Shortly afterwards, when Gerry Raffles joined the troupe, MacColl and Littlewood divorced, though they still worked together for many years and Littlewood was godmother to MacColl's two children. Littlewood and Raffles were life partners until his death in 1975.

In 1953, after an attempt to establish a permanent base in Glasgow, Theatre Workshop took up residence at the Theatre Royal in Stratford, east London, where it gained an international reputation, performing plays across Europe and in the Soviet Union. One of Littlewood's most famous productions was the British première of Bertolt Brecht's Mother Courage and Her Children (1955), which she directed and also starred in. Her production of Fings Ain't Wot They Used T'Be, a musical about the London underworld, became a hit and ran from 1959 to 1962, transferring to the West End.

The works for which she is now best remembered are probably Shelagh Delaney's A Taste of Honey (1958), which gained critical acclaim, and the satirical musical Oh, What a Lovely War! (1963), her stage adaptation of a work for radio by Charles Chilton. Both were made into films. She received a Tony Award nomination for Best Direction of a Musical for Oh, What a Lovely War!, becoming the first woman nominated for the award. Theatre Workshop also championed the work of Irish playwright Brendan Behan.

== Later life and death ==
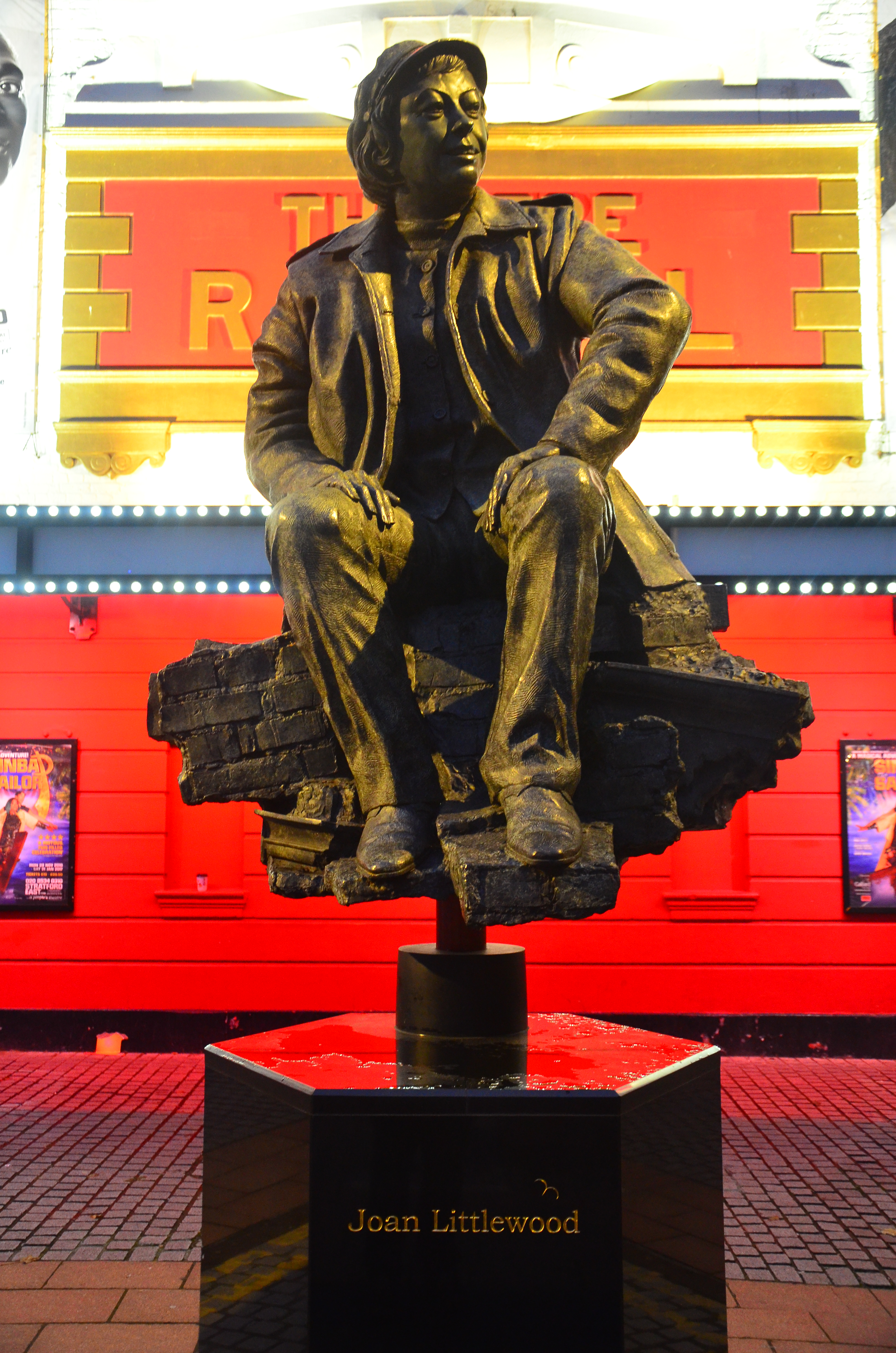
Philip Jackson's sculpture of Joan Littlewood at Theatre Royal Stratford

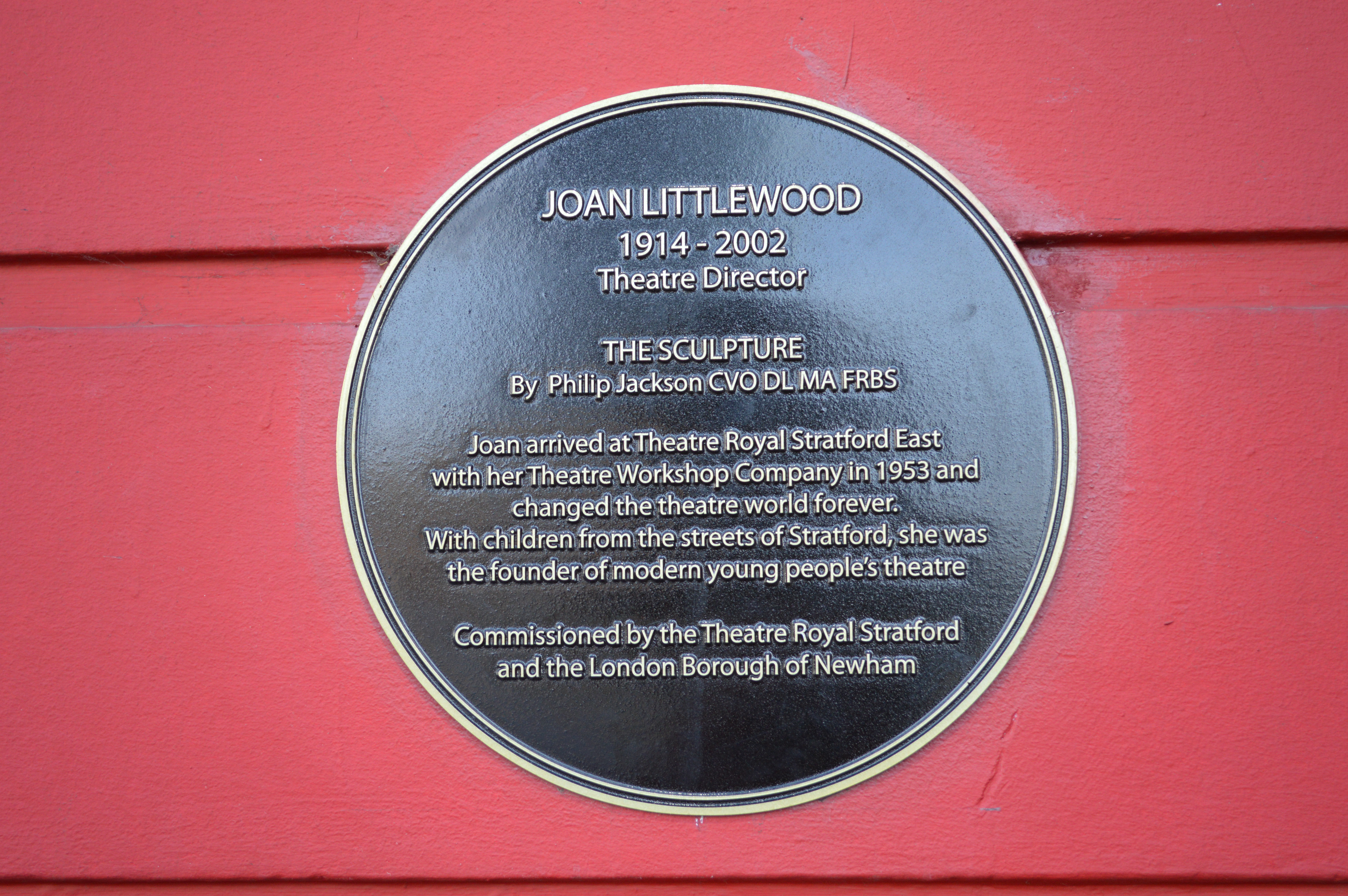
Plaque on the wall of the Theatre Royal Stratford, commemorating Joan Littlewood and the erection of the sculpture of her on 4 October 2015

After Raffles's death in 1975, Littlewood left Theatre Workshop and stopped directing. After a time of drifting she settled in France and became the companion of Baron Philippe de Rothschild, the vintner and poet, and wrote his memoirs Milady Vine. In the mid-1980s, she commenced work on her 1994 autobiography, Joan's Book.

Littlewood died in 2002 of natural causes in London at the age of 87.

== Portrayals ==
Littlewood was played by Zoë Wanamaker in the 2017 BBC Television drama Babs, about the life of Barbara Windsor.

== Honours ==
- Commandeur de l'ordre des Arts et des Lettres (1986)
