= Dirty Linen and New-Found-Land =

Pair of two Tom Stoppard plays always performed together

1976 playbill cover

Dirty Linen and New-Found-Land is a pair of two 1976 Tom Stoppard plays that are always performed together. New-Found-Land interrupts the two parts of Dirty Linen. It was first performed as an Ambiance Lunch-Hour Theatre Club presentation at Interaction's Almost Free Theatre on April 6, 1976. Then, opening in June 1976, it played four years at the Arts.

== Plot ==
A Select Committee of the House of Commons of the United Kingdom meets to discuss a ridiculous scandal on which the tabloid press has begun focusing. The papers allege that some mystery woman has accused 128 members of the House of sexual promiscuity. The six members of the Committee look into it so as to maintain the House's good name. Ironically, each member of the committee reminds the secretary, Miss. Madeleine Gotobed, not to bring up their most recent rendezvous. They do not want the press to get the wrong idea. It turns out that the secretary, who is not very adept at dictation, is the woman who has been spotted with all of these men.

The curtain falls and then rises again for New-Found-Land in which an older and a younger man, two Home Office officials, briefly discuss the naturalization of an American into British citizenship (based on the real-life naturalization of the play's director, ED Berman MBE). They laud the American nation as a whole, including every American patriotic cliché they can remember. Eventually, the Select Committee returns and tries to reclaim its room. The play ends with Maddie and M.P. French passing a new report that clears all men of having done wrong.

== Reception ==
Christopher Hahn unfavorably compared Dirty Linen with Stoppard's earlier short plays The Real Inspector Hound and After Magritte, writing that it "establishes no special relationship with the audience, nor does it make use of particular theatrical conventions, or even parody to any great extent the genre of the sex farce, surely fruitful ground for Stoppard's ironic talent. Instead, the play is a fairly straightforward duplication of a recognisable type, with the slight difference that assumptions about the dumb blonde usually prominent in this kind of play are overturned". However, Hahn praised New-Found-Land for its "clever manipulation of props" and its "conciseness and economy".

== See also ==
- Arts Theatre
