= Almost Free Theatre =

Alternative theatre in Soho, London

Coordinates: 51.5106°N 0.1325°W

The Almost Free Theatre was an alternative and fringe theatre set up by American actor and social activist E. D. Berman in 1971 in Rupert Street, Soho, London.

Audiences paid what they could afford, but at least one penny. It also pioneered the lunchtime performance, which bought in a whole new audience. The theatre staged seasons, including the first season of gay plays in Britain, the first women's season, a Jewish season, an anti-nuclear season and a season to mark the 1976 American Bicentennial. There were readings of John Arden and Margaretta D'Arcy's controversial The Non-Stop Connolly Show (1976) on Irish politics.

Numerous individual new plays by writers Mike Stott, Henry Livings, Michael Stevens, Wolf Mankowitz and Edward Bond were performed.

Tom Stoppard developed several of his key one-act plays here, including After Magritte and Dogg's Hamlet, Cahoot's Macbeth. His highly successful Dirty Linen and New-Found-Land went on to transfer from the Almost Free to run for four-and-a-half years at the Arts Theatre.
