= Comedy in Music =

Broadway comedy by Victor Borge

Comedy in Music is an original Broadway comedy by Victor Borge, with no additional cast involved, performed as a one-man show.

== Production ==
Comedy in Music opened at the John Golden Theatre in New York City on October 2, 1953. It became the longest running one-man show in the history of theater with 849 performances by the time it closed on January 21, 1956, a feat which placed it in the Guinness Book of World Records.

== Recordings ==
- Comedy in Music, Vol. 1 (1954, Columbia Records CL-6292, 10'' LP)
- Comedy in Music, Vol. 2 (1954, Columbia Records CL-6293, 10'' LP)
- Comedy in Music (1954, Columbia Records CL-554, LP)
- Comedy in Music (1972, CBS S 53140, LP)
- Comedy in Music (1999, Collectables Records 6032, CD)
- Comedy in Music (2009, SHO-227, CD)
