= Cedric Price =

English architect

Cedric Price FRIBA
- Born: 11 September 1934; Stone, Staffordshire, England
- Died: 10 August 2003 (aged 68); London, England
- Education: St John's College, Cambridge; Architectural Association School of Architecture
- Occupation: Architect
- Partner: Eleanor Bron (?–2003; his death)

Cedric Price FRIBA (11 September 1934 – 10 August 2003) was an English architect and influential teacher and writer on architecture.

== Early life and education ==
The son of the architect A.G. Price, who worked with Harry Weedon, Price was born in Stone, Staffordshire. He studied architecture at St John's College, Cambridge, graduating in 1955, and the Architectural Association School of Architecture (AA) in London, where he encountered and was influenced by the modernist architect and urban planner Arthur Korn. From 1958 to 1964 he taught part-time at the AA and at the Council of Industrial Design. He later founded Polyark, an architectural schools network.

== Career ==
After graduating, Price worked briefly for Erno Goldfinger, Denys Lasdun, the partnership of Maxwell Fry and Jane Drew, and applied unsuccessfully for a post at London County Council, working briefly as a professional illustrator before starting his own practice in 1960. He worked with The Earl of Snowdon and Frank Newby on the design of the Snowdon Aviary at London Zoo (1961). He later also worked with Buckminster Fuller on the Claverton Dome.

One of his more notable projects was the East London Fun Palace (1961), developed in association with theatrical director Joan Littlewood and cybernetician Gordon Pask. Although it was never built, its flexible space influenced other architects, notably Richard Rogers and Renzo Piano whose Centre Georges Pompidou in Paris extended many of Price's ideas – some of which Price used on a more modest scale in the Inter-Action Centre at Kentish Town, London (1971).

Having conceived the idea of using architecture and education as a way to drive economic redevelopment—notably in the north Staffordshire Potteries area (the 'Think-Belt' project)—he continued to contribute to planning debates. Think-Belt (1963–66) envisaged the reuse of an abandoned railway line as a roving "higher education facility", re-establishing the Potteries as a centre of science and technology. Mobile classroom, laboratory and residential modules could be moved grouped and assembled as required.

In 1969, with planner Sir Peter Hall and the editor of New Society magazine Paul Barker, he published Non-plan, a work challenging planning orthodoxy.

In 1984, Price proposed the redevelopment of London's South Bank, and foresaw the London Eye by suggesting that a giant Ferris wheel should be constructed by the River Thames.

== Personal life and death ==
Price was the partner of the actress Eleanor Bron. They had no children.

Price died in London, aged 68, in 2003.

== Recognition ==
In 2002, Price was awarded the Austrian Frederick Kiesler Prize for Architecture and the Arts.
