= After Magritte =

1970 play written by Tom Stoppard

After Magritte is a surreal comedy written by Tom Stoppard in 1970. It was first performed in the Green Banana Restaurant at the Ambiance Lunch-hour Theatre Club in London.

== History ==
Tom Stoppard wrote After Magritte during the period of his well-known plays Rosencrantz and Guildenstern Are Dead and The Real Inspector Hound. Stoppard was already well-established as a writer of stage, radio, and television plays. The idea struck for After Magritte came to him while writing the radio play Artist Descending a Staircase, which was based on a Marcel Duchamp painting of a similar name. Around this time Stoppard was beginning to become interested in bringing his plays to an American stage.

== Motifs ==
=== Surrealism ===
After Magritte is an example of surrealism in the arts, in which what is seen by the naked eye is not what the art necessarily expresses. The basis of the surrealism in this play is the predisposition of René Magritte as a surrealist painter; Stoppard sought to bring to life the characters inside of Magritte’s surrealist reality. The idea behind After Magritte is partly to represent the surrealist schools of thought that are shared between art forms, but also to animate Magritte's world of still images, and to its illogical situations perpetually illogical.

=== Absurdism (Art vs Reality) ===
After Magritte is also an example of Absurdism, which is based on the idea that humans are always in search of inherent meaning in life, even when there is no meaning—at least none that is understandable. As Magritte's paintings places figures in situations that are devoid of meaning to our eyes, so Stoppard's characters try to find meaning, even as they don’t know why they are in this painting or why they are doing certain things. Stoppard creates confusion through his use of language: "Several critics have noticed the specific quality of language in the play, the use of puns and the fact that language is an inadequate means of describing reality."

== Setting of the play ==
The setting of the play takes in an unidentified René Magritte painting that bears similarities to his L'assassin menacé. Stoppard describes the set in his script: “The only light comes through the large window which is facing the audience…The central ceiling light hangs from a long flex which disappears up into the flies. The lampshade itself it a heavy metal hemisphere, opaque,…similarly hanging from the flies, is a fruit basket attractively overflowing with apples, oranges, bananas, pineapple, and grapes,…It will become apparent that the light fixture is on a counterweight system, it can be raised and lowered, or kept in any vertical position, by means of the counterbalance, which in this case is a basket of fruit. Most of the furniture is stack up against the street door in a sort of barricade, an essential item is a long low bench-type table, about eight feet long, but the pile also includes a settee, two comfortable chairs, a TV set, a cupboard and a wind up gramophone with an old-fashioned horn…” The set as described by Stoppard resembles the beginning of the play Tango by Slawomir Mrożek, which was translated by Stoppard in 1966.

== Synopsis ==
The play begins with an astonished policeman looking through the window of a house where a group of people are posed in a bizarre, surreal tableau reminiscent of the paintings of René Magritte. Finding this suspicious, he calls in his inspector.

Inside the room, a rational explanation for the tableau gradually becomes apparent. Two ballroom dancers, a man and a woman named Reginald and Thelma Harris, are hurriedly getting ready for an event. A lampshade which had used bullets as a counterweight has broken and a woman crawls on the floor to look for them. The mother plays the tuba.

The inspector arrives and asks about the family's memories of a man they had seen outside of the Tate Gallery, where a René Magritte exhibit is being held. He invents an entirely false story, accusing the family of complicity in a crime known as the Crippled Minstrel Caper. As he continues, the stage picture becomes increasingly ridiculous. For instance, the couple offers the inspector a banana as the male dancer stands on one foot. One scene is even performed in total darkness. By the end of the play, the characters are posed in another Magritte-like tableau.

== Reception ==
Randolph Ryan praised After Magritte as “a clever and funny look at the problem of determining reality, reduced from philosophic terms to those of farce.” Theresa Montana Sabo dubbed it "witty" along with The Real Inspector Hound (1968). Jadwiga Uchman called the play "hilariously funny" in 1999 and argued, "Stoppard wittily employs language to create confusion, making it clear that it is an imperfect tool for describing reality." Nancy Worssam of The Seattle Times wrote, "None of this preposterous yet outrageously funny behavior seems to make sense. Amazingly, by play’s conclusion, everything that had appeared to be totally idiotic is explainable. And isn’t that more than a bit like life?"

Leone Lucille Michel stated, "Attention to structure at the expense of ideas marks this as one of Stoppard's less notable achievements. Nevertheless, as ingeniously constructed light entertainment, After Magritte succeeds to a great extent". Jess M. Bravin of The Harvard Crimson said that the play is, like The Real Inspector Hound, weaker in character development and plot than in dialogue, but that this is a less important flaw in the case of After Magritte because of its brevity. He described both works as "diverting and enjoyable entertainment". Adam Langer praised the exchanges between the five characters about the man walking near the gallery as "hilariously whimsical and disorienting [...] despite the sophomoric philosophizing about perceptions, the play, with its many inspired sight gags and turns of phrase, can be a hoot."

Clive Barnes referred to After Magritte as "a brief Dadaist sketch that somehow does not quite sustain itself". J. Wynn Rousuck of The Baltimore Sun dismissed it as a "trifle" for Stoppard. Todd Everett wrote that "Stoppard’s manic script [...] simply doesn’t make much sense."

== Premiere ==
Actors and characters for premiere at the Green Banana Restaurant at the Ambiance Lunch-hour Theatre Club in London.

- Harris – Stephen Moore
- Thelma – Prunella Scales
- Mother – Josephine Tewson
- Foot – Clive Barker
- Holmes – Malcolm Ingram

Directed by Geoffrey Reeves
