= When Eight Bells Toll (film) =

1971 film directed by Étienne Périer

- DVD cover
- Directed by: Étienne Périer
- Written by: Alistair MacLean
- Based on: When Eight Bells Toll by Alistair MacLean
- Produced by: Elliott Kastner; Jerry Gershwin
- Starring: Anthony Hopkins; Robert Morley; Jack Hawkins; Nathalie Delon; Corin Redgrave; Derek Bond
- Cinematography: Arthur Ibbetson
- Edited by: John Shirley
- Music by: Angela Morley (credited as Walter Stott)
- Production companies: Gershwin-Kastner Productions; Winkast Film Production
- Distributed by: Rank Film Distributors (UK); Cinerama Releasing Corporation (US)
- Release date: 9 March 1971
- Running time: 94 minutes
- Country: United Kingdom
- Language: English
- Budget: $1.8 million

When Eight Bells Toll is a 1971 British action film directed by Étienne Périer and starring Anthony Hopkins, Jack Hawkins, Robert Morley, and Nathalie Delon. Set in Scotland, it is based upon Scottish author Alistair MacLean's 1965 novel of the same name. Producer Elliott Kastner planned to produce a string of realistic gritty espionage thrillers to rival the James Bond series, but the film's poor box office receipts ended his plans.

== Plot ==
British Treasury secret agent Phillip Calvert is sent to investigate the hijacking of five cargo ships in the Irish Sea, tracking the latest hijacked ship – the Nantesville, carrying £8 million in gold bullion – to the Scottish Highlands and the sleepy port town of "Torbay" on the "Isle of Torbay" (actually filmed in Tobermory, on the Isle of Mull).

Posing as marine biologists, Calvert and his partner Hunslett find the local inhabitants suspicious and hostile. They suspect that Cypriot tycoon and shipping magnate Sir Anthony Skouras, whose luxury yacht Shangri-La is anchored off the coast, may be behind the pirating of the gold bullion. While searching the surrounding area in a Royal Navy Helicopter, Calvert makes contact with a group of remote shark fishermen who appear friendlier than Torbay's locals. Calvert also meets the occupants of a castle, Lord Kirkside and his teenage daughter, who behave strangely as well as being hostile.

As the helicopter brings Calvert back to Torbay it comes under attack from the shore and the Royal Navy pilot is killed. The helicopter crashes onto the rocky shoreline, explodes and slides into the sea. Calvert escapes from the helicopter after it sinks to the bottom. When he returns to his research yacht Firecrest he finds Hunslett is missing and is surprised by the presence of his boss Sir Arthur Arnford-Jones, known as "Uncle Arthur". Together, they combat boarders and make ready for sea. On raising the anchor they find the dead body of Hunslett tied to it.

They are joined by Skouras's wife, Charlotte, whom they find calling for help in the sea. She claims to have escaped his yacht after he beat her. Calvert is both attracted to, and suspicious of her.

When a pirate speedboat approaches, Calvert rams it, shoots the occupants and blows up the boat in vengeance for Hunslett's death.

Calvert recruits the shark fishermen to deal with Skouras and his modern day pirates. Guessing that the missing bullion ships are being sunk to allow the gold to be offloaded invisibly, Calvert dives in the bay and finds the Nantesville. He fights and kills one of the divers, whom he has previously encountered and who he suspects killed Hunslett.

He then secretly enters Kirkside's castle and questions the Lord's daughter, discovering that Skouras is an innocent victim whose real wife is being held hostage along with other locals down in the castle's dungeons. He then sneaks into the underground dock of the castle where the gold is being offloaded.

At midnight (eight bells) the shark fishermen ram the gates of the underground dock with their boat. The pirates are expecting them because Charlotte has been transmitting Calvert's plans to them by secret radio. She is actually the wife of their ringleader, not Skouras. A fire fight ensues in which the pirates are wiped out, after which Calvert lets Charlotte escape with a single bar of gold in her possession.

== Cast ==
- Anthony Hopkins as Commander Philip Calvert
- Robert Morley as Sir Arthur Arnford-Jones (Uncle Arthur)
- Nathalie Delon as Charlotte Skouras
- Jack Hawkins as Sir Anthony Skouras
- Corin Redgrave as Roy Hunslett
- Derek Bond as Lord Charnley
- Ferdy Mayne as Lavorski
- Maurice Roëves as Lieutenant Scott Williams
- Leon Collins as Tim Hutchinson
- Wendy Allnutt as Sue Kirkside
- Peter Arne as Imrie
- Oliver MacGreevy as Quinn
- Tom Chatto as Lord Kirkside
- Edward Burnham as Macullum

An uncredited Charles Gray dubbed the voice of Jack Hawkins, whose larynx had been removed in March 1966 after being diagnosed with throat cancer. Gray was used with Hawkins' approval.

== Production ==
=== Development ===
In July 1966, Kastner and his producing partner Jerry Gershwin had purchased five screenplays from MacLean: Where Eagles Dare, When Eight Bells Toll, and three other unnamed ones. In November Kastner announced they would make the film as part of a 14-film slate over two years. Among the 14 movies were Maclean's Where Eagles Dare, which was a big hit in 1968, leading to high expectations for When Eight Bells Toll.

Kastner saw When Eight Bells Toll as a combination of The Guns of Navarone, Gunga Din and The Treasure of the Sierra Madre. "There was a strong character and a great adventure in there," recalled Kastner.

MacLean elected to adapt his novel for the cinema himself, and kept the adaptation close to the novel. The story is very close to the source text, and features some of the same witty dialogue. Some of the twists in the ending have been changed, however, and a shootout replaces MacLean's original Agatha Christie-style summation.

Elliott Kastner hoped that the film would be the first of a series of spy adventures films featuring MacLean's Philip Calvert character by capturing James Bond series fans after the anticipated demise of that series (Sean Connery was believed to be planning to quit the Bond role, and some thought that the Bond series would end after his departure).

The director was a Belgian, Etienne Perier who had done low budget movies. Kastner later said hiring him was "probably the one mistake" he made on the film.

Kastner says he raised the budget by ringing "a guy I read about in Fortune magazine and I went and saw him and said 'I need one point eight million dollars to make this second Alistair Maclean project.' And he heard me out and he wrote the damn cheque." Hopkins was paid £8,000 for his performance.

=== Casting ===
Kastner wanted a Celtic actor to play the hero Calvert, having enjoyed a big success casting Richard Burton in Where Eagles Dare. "I saw the agent Calvert as a very exciting characterisation," said Kastner. "A lot could be done with him. But I didn't want a Tony Curtis. I didn't want a star. I wanted a classical actor. A real actor." He considered Michael Jayston and Anthony Hopkins for the role. Hopkins, then best known as a stage actor for his work at the National Theatre, was chosen on the basis of his performance in The Lion in Winter.

Hopkins says he turned down the role at first, worried about being an action star. "It seemed too fast for me," he said. "I could hear myself saying, 'Now wait a minute'. Then when I had finally overcome my fright I said to myself 'I'd be mad to turn this chance down.' I didn't."

Kastner wanted Hopkins to lose weight for the role. Bond film stunt arranger Bob Simmons helped him slim down to become a convincing Royal Naval officer trained as a commando and frogman.

=== Filming ===
Filming started in September 1969 and went for sixteen weeks. It was done partly on location on and near the Isle of Mull in Scotland, including Tobermory, Dervaig, Bloody Bay, Rubha nan Gall lighthouse, Duart Castle, and Fingal's Cave. Studio work was filmed at Pinewood.

The main helicopter used in the film is a Westland Widgeon painted in Royal Navy Rescue helicopter colours. The helicopter, registered G-ANLW was also seen in the 1981 war movie Eye of the Needle. The aircraft still exists and in 2021 was reported as being restored to flying condition.

The ship used to represent Calvert and Hunslett's yacht Firecrest was the Tavit, built in 1966 at Berwick Shipyard. The ship still exists to this day, currently registered in Greece. Skouras' yacht, the Shangri-La was in reality the Maureen Mhor, built in 1961 by Yarrows. The ship still exists, now called the Camara C. The "Northern Diver" the boat used to search for Calvert after the helicopter crash is currently being assessed for restoration by Cam Marine Services on the Isle of Skye.

During filming Hopkins fell in love with one of Kastner's assistants, Jennifer Lynton, and left his first wife, Petronella Barker, and their daughter, Abigail Hopkins, for her. Lynton became Hopkins' second wife.

== Release ==
When Eight Bells Toll performed poorly in cinemas in the US, although it was more popular in Europe and was the 11th most popular film at the British box office in 1971.

Kastner said the film "tripled its money" but admitted it was a disappointment.

== Reception ==
The Monthly Film Bulletin wrote: "The characters are standard MacLean inventions – tough, unconventional agent and likeable but prickly boss – but the tested clichés look quite fleshy in a setting and climate that manage to be both appropriately inhospitable and recognisably human. Calvert's dour professionalism and emotional tensions are well set off by the bleak vistas of the Western Highlands and the uncommunicative minor characters ... The fact that the Panavision cameras roving across glittering seascapes and precipitous cliffs are also visiting the author's ancestral home may be a factor; and Périer does well to keep these landscapes cunningly in view, maintaining a subdued sense of menace across the glassy grey expanses of sea."

The Guardian described the film as, "All thoroughly silly but routine rather than rotten".

== Notes ==
- Callan, Michael Feeney (1994). Anthony Hopkins. Scribner. ISBN 9780684196794.
