= Jerry Gershwin =

American film producer

- Born: Jerome Gershwin; April 10, 1926; New York City, New York, U.S.
- Died: September 17, 1997 (aged 71); Los Angeles, California, U.S.
- Occupation: Film producer
- Years active: 1966 – 1993

Jerome "Jerry" Gershwin (April 20, 1926 – September 17, 1997) was an American film producer. He was best known for his long collaboration with Elliott Kastner. His credits include Where Eagles Dare (1968) and Harper (1966). He was a member of the Academy of Motion Pictures Arts & Sciences.

Gershwin was born in New York City. He died at the age of 71 in Los Angeles, California from leukemia.

== Partial filmography ==
- Bound By Honor (1993)
- Nomads (1986)
- Breakheart Pass (1975)
- Your Three Minutes Are Up (1973)
- When Eight Bells Toll (1971)
- A Severed Head (1970)
- The Walking Stick (1970)
- Tam-Lin (1970)
- The Night of the Following Day (1968)
- Where Eagles Dare (1968)
- Sweet November (1968)
- Harper (1966)
