= Tenneck =

Tenneck may refer to:

- Tenneck (Werfen), a village in the cadastral municipality of Sulzau in the municipality of Werfen, Salzburg, Austria
- Hoher Tenneck (2,455 m), a peak in the Hochkönig massif, above the Blühnbach valley near Tenneck, Salzburg, Austria
  - Niederer Tenneck, an arête below the Hoher Tenneck
