= Schloss Blühnbach =

Castle in Austria

Coordinates: 47.4803°N 13.1049°E

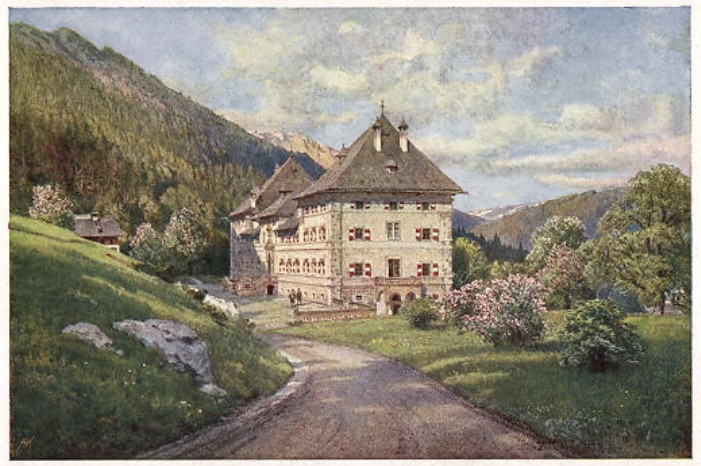
Schloss Blühnbach

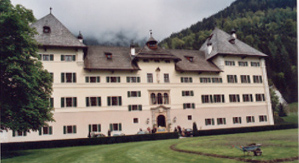
Schloss Blühnbach garden front

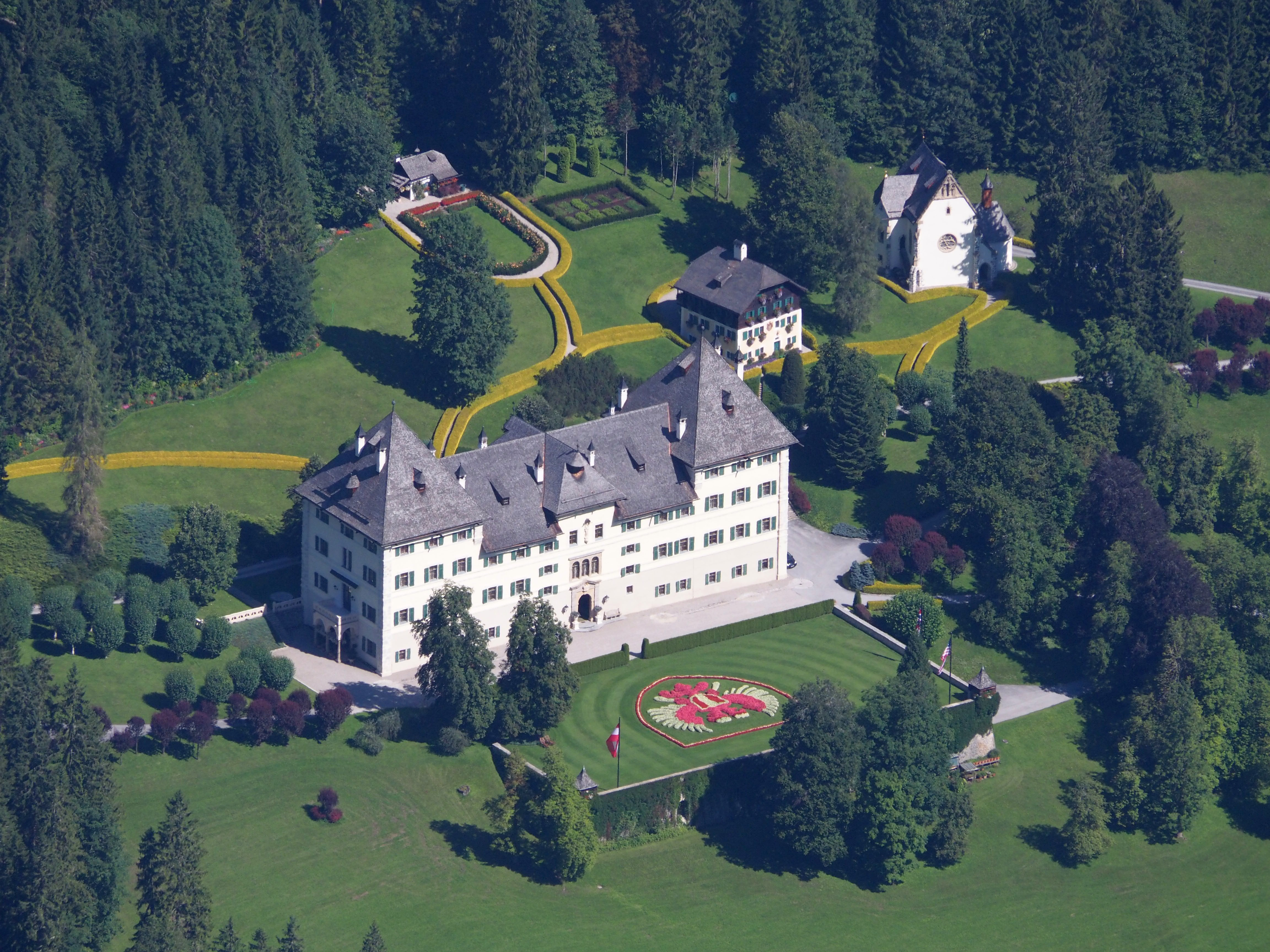
Schloss Blühnbach from the air with the chapel and the Jägerhaus to the right

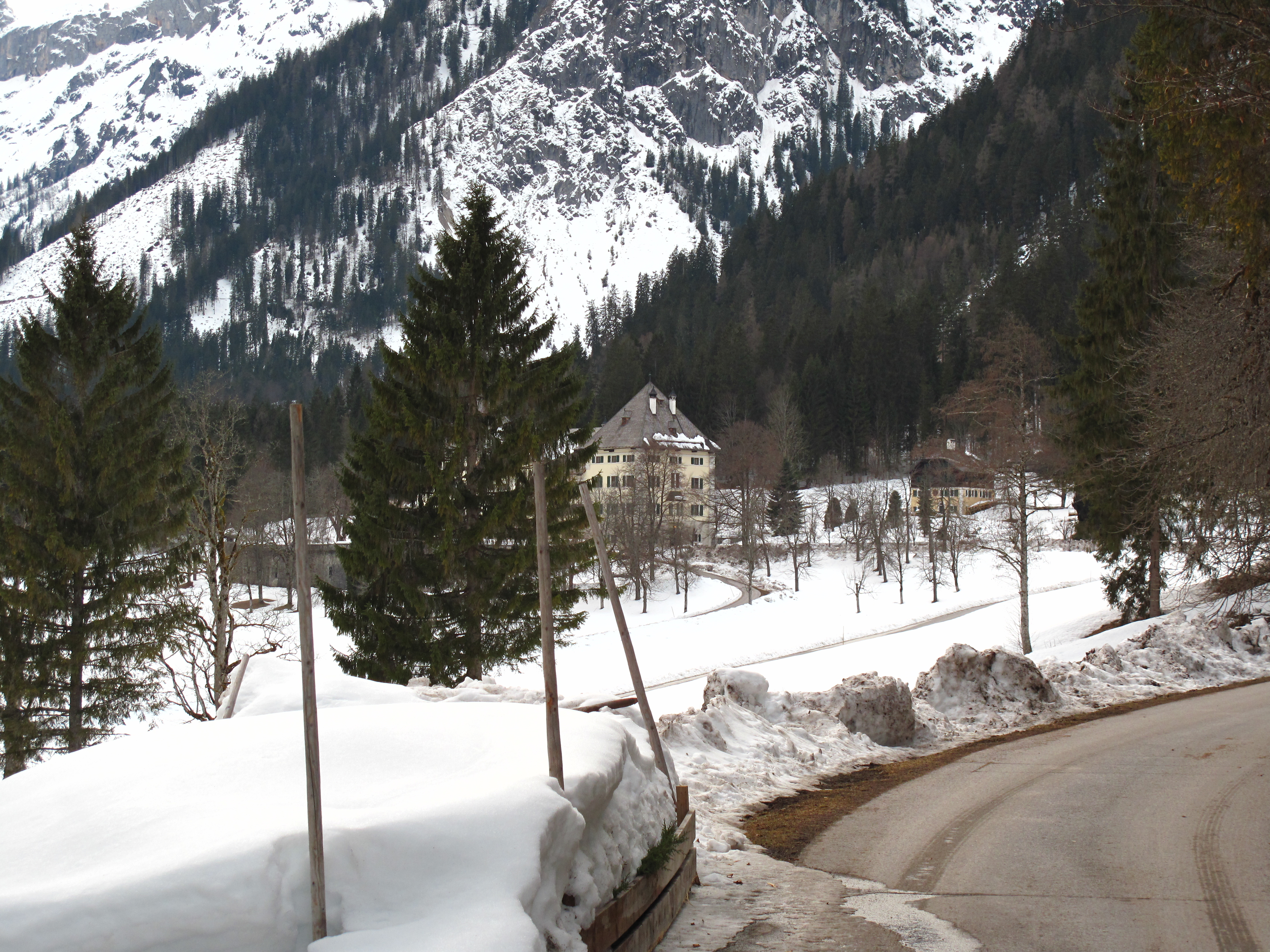
Schloss Blühnbach from a distance

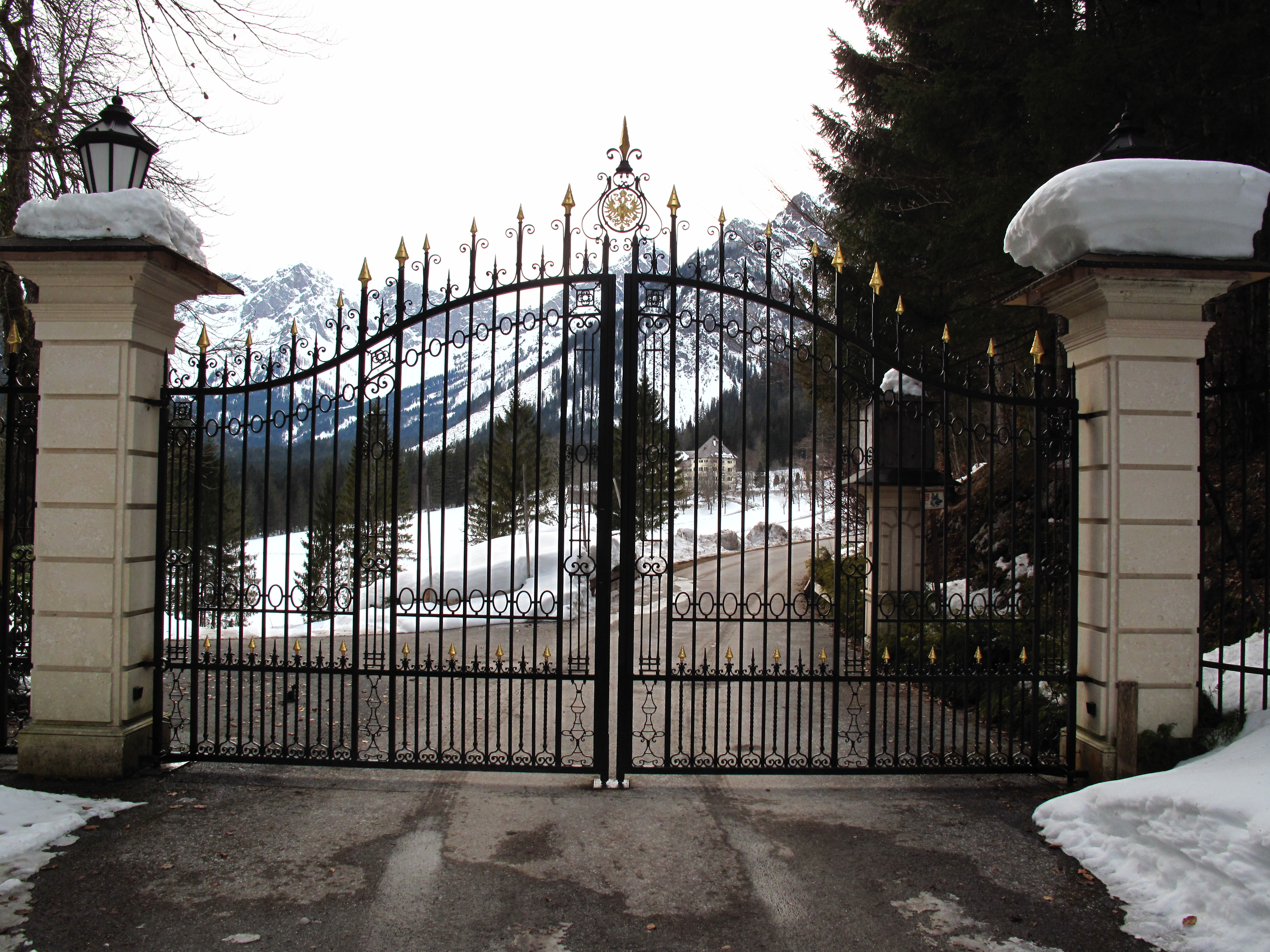
Schloss Blühnbach is closed to the general public

Schloss Blühnbach (German: Schloss Blühnbach) is a stately home in the Blühnbach valley in Werfen, Salzburg (state), Austria. Formerly, it was a hunting lodge of the Prince-Archbishops of Salzburg and Archduke Franz Ferdinand of Austria, heir to the Austro-Hungarian throne, whose assassination in Sarajevo triggered World War I. The estate is privately owned by a charitable foundation, and is not open to the general public.

== History ==
=== Prince-Archbishops of Salzburg ===
Already in the Middle Ages, there was a hunting seat of the Salzburg Archbishops in the Blühnbach Valley. During the German Peasants' War of 1525/1526, the manor house was destroyed. However, it was soon restored afterwards. It was a modest building, primarily constructed from wood. Prince-Archbishop Wolf Dietrich von Raitenau (1559-1617) created a hunting lodge in stone between 1603 and 1608. The name of the architect is not known, but an attribution to the Italian Vincenzo Scamozzi from Vicenza could be defended, as he was working in Salzburg at the same time. Although some state that this is just speculation. Master builders involved were Ruep Eder, Andrä Mairer and Gabriël Prändtl. In 1604, a newly fitted roof collapsed under the snow load of the harsh winter and had to be renewed the next year. With the finalization of the stables, the castle was completed in 1608. However, the planned magnificent interior decoration was largely omitted, as Wolf Dietrich was disposed and his successor Prince-Archbishop Markus Sittich von Hohenems (1574-1619) was not fond of hunting. Instead, he preferred the pleasure gardens of Hellbrunn Palace.

Blühnbach’s first heyday was under Prince-Archbishop Paris Lodron (1586-1653). Large hunting events were held in the valley. Also, he invited important guest such as Leopold V, Archduke of Austria (1586-1632) and Claudia de' Medici (1604-1648) to join the hunt events. In this period, a large stable was constructed to house the hunting dogs. From the 18th century, Schloss Blühnbach lost its attraction with the Prince-Archbishops due to its remote location. The hunting lodge in Weitwörth was much closer to Salzburg. It soon served as a stud farm for several hundred horses. The last Prince-Archbishop, Hieronymus von Colloredo (1732-1812, Prince-Archbishop from 1772 to 1803), was fond of hunting and loved to come to Blühnbach. He expanded the castle, reroofed it and replaced the furniture.

After the incorporation of the Salzburg state into Austria, the castle belonged to the Austrian state. It was leased to a hunting society of local nobility in 1842. They used it as a base for big game hunting. On invite of the society, Archduke Franz Ferdinand visited the Blühnbach for the first time in 1892.

=== Archduke Franz Ferdinand of Austria ===
When Archduke Franz Ferdinand became interested in the estate, it was transferred from the Austrian state to the Habsburg private property in 1908. Franz Ferdinand was able to acquire practically the entire valley, creating a hunting estate with 14,000 hectares of forest. He used the castle as a hunting lodge. He engaged the Viennese architect Ludwig Simon to convert and expand the castle in historicist style and “embellish” the former Renaissance fronts with Neo-Renaissance decor. Also, an additional floor was added to the building changing its proportions. For the interior, he engaged the Viennese firm Sigmund Járay. The aim was to find furniture in the art trade that once belonged to Prince-Archbishop Wolf Dietrich or at least came from his time. However, the heir to the throne could not enjoy his new hunting lodge for long, as the construction work was not completed until 1913 and he was assassinated in Sarajevo the following year, which triggered the First World War. Shortly before, he had killed a white chamois in the Blühnbach area, which gave new fuel to the old hunter's superstition that shooting down a white animal is bad luck.

=== Krupp von Bohlen und Halbach ===
In 1916, Emperor Franz Joseph I of Austria sold the estate to Gustav Krupp von Bohlen und Halbach (1870-1950), who used it as a place to spend the summer holidays. Gustav was to become one of the defendants in the Nuremberg trials after the Second World War. However, he was removed from the list as he was unfit to stand trial due to illness. He spent his last years in Blühnbach. At the same time, the American authorities confiscated the main building and converted it into a refugee home with 80 rooms. Only, in the 1950s, it was returned to Gustav’s son Alfried Krupp von Bohlen und Halbach (1907-1967). After his death, the estate passed to his son Arndt von Bohlen und Halbach (1938-1986). In 1973, the forests surrounding the castle were sold to the Austrian Federal Forest agency (German: Österreichische Bundesforste).

=== Frederick R. Koch ===
In 1988, Arndt’s widow sold the castle and the estate to Frederick R. Koch (1933-2020), an American collector and philanthropist. He was the eldest of the four sons born to American industrialist Fred Chase Koch, founder of what is now Koch Industries, and Mary Clementine (née Robinson) Koch. As from the 1980s, Frederick Koch started to collect and restore historic houses such as the Donahue house, a Woolworth mansion in Manhattan;, the Romanesque Villa Torre Clementina in Cap Martin, France; and Elm Court, a Tudor Gothic manse in Butler, Pennsylvania. Also, Schloss Blühnbach was painstakingly restored.

Koch died in February 2020, and the property was transferred to a foundation in his name. The foundation's mission is to preserve, inspire and celebrate the rich cultural heritage embodied by Schloss Blühnbach while empowering creativity, fostering education, and advancing global collaboration.

== Architecture ==
The south-east facing central front of the castle consists of several parts. A round-arched portal with place stones and wedge stones from the beginning of the 17th century is surmounted by a profiled flat gable. A new statue of Mary can be seen above it. The adjoining parts only have three floors, the outer parts again tower over the middle part. Accordingly, the roof is divided into five. The narrow side in the southwest has four floors and is equipped with a Gothic portal, a terrace resting on columns and a romantic balustrade. The floors are divided by double fascias and coupled windows. This is typical of buildings from the time of Prince-Archbishop Wolf Dietrich. A hall with barrel vaults runs through the lower floor. A kitchen was installed in the former stables. A flight of stairs leads to a large hall on the second floor, which is connected to wide, hall-like corridors. To the north-east of Schloss Blühnbach is the so-called hunter’s house (German: Jägerhaus), dating from 1780. Two floors are brick, a third is made of wood. Archbishop Colloredo's coat of arms is attached to the house.

== Chapel ==
The chapel at Schloss Blühnbach Castle bears the name ‘St. Rupert im Blühnbachtal’ and is dedicated to Saint Rupert, the patron saint of the Austrian state of Salzburg. The chapel has been mentioned for the first time in 1582. Under Archduke Franz Ferdinand, the original chapel, dedicated to Our Lady, was remodeled in a neo-Gothic style and became a side chapel of a newly built, larger chapel of St. Rupert. The archduke himself put together the furnishings for this. The last member of the Krupp family, Arndt von Bohlen und Halbach, was buried in the crypt of the castle chapel in 1986.

== Vicinity ==
The Blühnbachstraße from Tenneck to Schloss Blühnbach is only open to pedestrians.

== Literature ==
- Heinrich Graf von Spreti (2016). Das Jagdschloss Blühnbach (in German). Wien: Brandstätter Verlag. p. 160. ISBN 978-3-7106-0100-2.
- Maria-Katharina Aschaber (1994). Blühnbach als Idee eines herrschaftlichen Jagdsitzes (degree dissertation) (in German). Salzburg: University of Salzburg.
- Wladimir Aichelburg (2003). Der Thronfolger und die Architektur Erzherzog Franz Ferdinand von Österreich-Este als Bauherr (in German). Graz: NWV Neuer Wissenschaftlicher Verlag. p. 174. ISBN 978-3708301259.
- Ilsebill Barta, Marlene Ott-Wodni, Alena Skrabanek (2019). Repräsentation und (Ohn)Macht – Die Wohnkultur der habsburgischen Prinzen im 19. Jahrhundert - Kaiser Maximilian von Mexiko, Kronprinz Rudolf, Erzherzog Franz Ferdinand und ihre Schlösser – Eine Publikationsreihe M MD der Museen des Mobiliendepots - Band 038 (in German). Wien: Böhlau Verlag. p. 748. ISBN 978-3205200352.
- Die Kirchen von Pfarrwerfen - Werfen – Werfenweng (Christliche Kunststätten Österreichs) (PDF) (in German). Salzburg: Verlag St. Peter - Erzabtei St. Peter. 2006. p. 28.
- Hetz Siegfried (2018). Mit Macht und Pracht: Burgen, Schlösser und Klöster im fürsterzbischöflichen Salzburg (in German). Salzburg: Verlag Anton Pustet Salzburg. p. 224. ISBN 978-3702507978.
- Friederike Zaisberger, Walter Schlegel (1978). Burgen und Schlösser in Salzburg. Pongau, Pinzgau, Lungau (in German). Vienna: Birken-Reihe. ISBN 3-85030-037-4.
- Robert Hoffmann (2011). "Erzherzog Franz Ferdinand und die Salzburger Altstadt". Bastei (60-4) (in German): 9–12.
- Pert Peternell (1968). "Schloss Blühnbach". Salzburger Volksblatt (24/25) (in German).
