= Ice Station Zebra (novel) =

1963 novel by Alistair MacLean

- First edition cover (UK)
- Author: Alistair MacLean
- Cover artist: John Heseltine
- Language: English
- Genre: Thriller
- Publisher: Collins (UK); Doubleday (US)
- Publication date: 1963
- Publication place: United Kingdom
- Media type: Print (hardcover)
- Pages: 276 pp.
- OCLC: 844681
- Preceded by: The Satan Bug
- Followed by: When Eight Bells Toll

Ice Station Zebra is a 1963 thriller novel written by Scottish author Alistair MacLean. It marked a return to MacLean's classic Arctic setting. After completing this novel, whose plot line parallels real-life events during the Cold War, MacLean retired from writing for three years. In 1968 it was loosely adapted into a film of the same name.

== Plot ==
Drift ice Station Zebra, a British meteorological station built on an ice floe in the Arctic Ocean, suffers a catastrophic oil fire; several of its men die, and their shelter and supplies are destroyed. The survivors take refuge in one hut with little food and heat.

The (fictional) American nuclear-powered submarine USS Dolphin is dispatched on a rescue mission. Just before it departs, Dr. Carpenter, the narrator, is sent to accompany it. Carpenter's background is unknown, but he claims that he is an expert in dealing with frostbite and other deep-cold medical conditions, and he carries orders from the Chief of Naval Operations of the United States Navy. Commander Swanson, the Dolphin submarine captain, is suspicious of Carpenter, and calls in his superior, Admiral Garvie. Garvie refuses to allow Carpenter on board without knowing his mission. Under duress, Carpenter finally reveals that the ice station is actually a highly-equipped listening post, keeping watch for nuclear missile launches from the Soviet Union, a statement that convinces the commander and the admiral.

Dolphin reaches the Arctic pack ice and dives under it. It surfaces in a break in the ice and succeeds in making tenuous radio contact with Ice Station Zebra. Carpenter confides to the Captain that the commander of the station is his brother. Having obtained a bearing on the station, Dolphin dives again, and succeeds in finding a lead 8 kilometres (5 mi) from the station and breaks through a crack in the ice above. Carpenter, Executive Officer Hansen, and two crewmen are put above on the pack ice and make the journey to the station on foot through an Arctic storm, taking with them as many supplies as they can. They reach Zebra after a near-impossible trek and find that eight of the men on the station are dead, while the 11 others are barely alive. Investigating the corpses, Carpenter finds that one of them has been shot. They find that their radio has been damaged, and so Carpenter and Hansen return to Dolphin. The American submarine moves close to the station, and finding no open water, uses a torpedo to blast a hole in the ice.

The sick men are cared for by Dolphin. Carpenter investigates further and finds that the fire was no accident; it was a cover to hide that three of the dead men, one of whom was his brother, were murdered. He also discovers some unburned supplies hidden in the bottom of a hut, while Swanson finds a gun hidden in a petrol tank. The surviving members of Zebra are brought on board the Dolphin, and the station is abandoned. While still under the ice, a fire breaks out in the engine room and the submarine is forced to shut down its nuclear reactor. Thanks to Swanson's ingenuity and several hours of hard work, the crew succeeds in saving the boat.

Carpenter calls a meeting of the survivors and announces that the fire was no accident. He reveals that he is an MI6 officer, and that his real mission was to retrieve photographic film from a reconnaissance satellite that has photographed every missile base in the United States. The film had been ejected from the satellite so that Soviet agents operating under cover at Zebra could retrieve it; Carpenter's brother had been sent to the station to prevent this. Carpenter reveals the identity of the Soviet agents, and arrests them.

The film of the American bases is recovered, but Carpenter has switched the film on the Soviets. The film they successfully sent to the Soviet surface ships is actually photographs of cartoon characters on the walls of the submarine's sick bay.

== Background and origin of plot ==
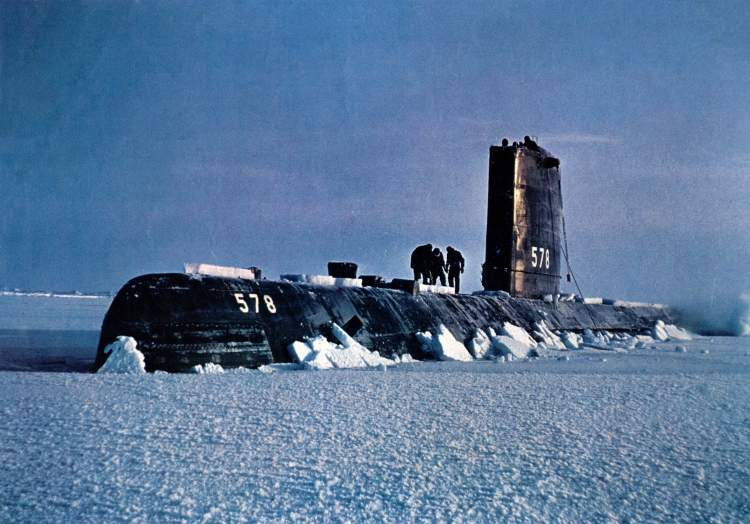
USS Skate

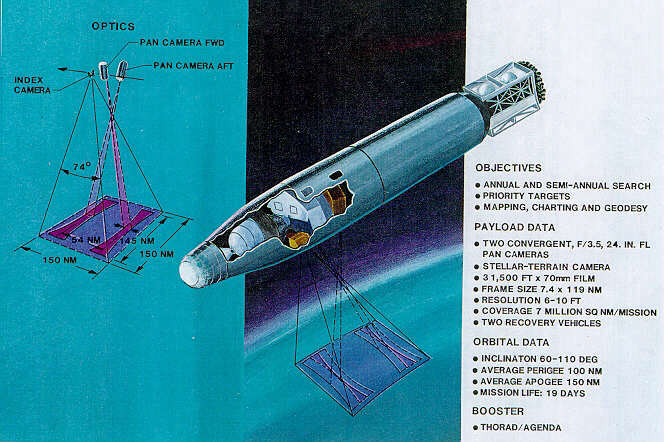
CORONA spy satellite

The novel was influenced by the heightened atmosphere of the Cold War, with its escalating series of international crises in the late 1950s and early 1960s, such as the 1960 U-2 incident; West Berlin; unrest in Hungary, Indochina, Congo, and Latin America; and the Cuban Missile Crisis.

The novel exploits contemporary fascination with the under-the-ice exploits of such American nuclear submarines as Nautilus (first to pass under the North Pole), Skate, Sargo and Seadragon. MacLean may have been anticipating the excitement of his British readers regarding the upcoming commissioning of HMS Dreadnought, the Royal Navy's first nuclear submarine. Also, MacLean may have been influenced by press reports about the nuclear-powered submarine USS Skate visiting Ice Station Alpha, located on Ice Island T-3 in the Arctic, on 14 August 1958, as part of the International Geophysical Year (IGY). At the time that the novel was published, under-the-ice operations by US Navy nuclear-powered submarines were prohibited until SUBSAFE measures had been implemented following the loss of USS Thresher.

Ice Station Zebra also uses the accelerating Space Race between the United States and the Soviet Union as the backdrop for the novel, and may have been directly inspired by news accounts from 17 April 1959, about a missing experimental CORONA satellite capsule (Discoverer 2) that inadvertently landed near Spitzbergen on 13 April and may have been recovered by Soviet agents. In 2006 the National Reconnaissance Office declassified information stating that "an individual formerly possessing CORONA access was the technical adviser to the movie" and admitted "the resemblance of the loss of the DISCOVERER II capsule, and its probable recovery by the Soviets" on Spitsbergen Island, to the book by Alistair MacLean.

The story has parallels with CIA Operation Cold Feet, which took place in May/June 1962. In this operation, two American officers parachuted from a CIA-operated Boeing B-17 Flying Fortress to an abandoned Soviet ice station. After searching the station, they were picked up three days later by the B-17 using the Fulton Sky hook system.

Finally, MacLean even mentions the newly-operational Soviet nuclear-powered icebreaker Lenin by involving the ship in an aborted attempt to reach the survivors at Drift Ice Station Zebra.

Maclean says he got much of the technical information of the novel from the book Nautilus 90 North by William Anderson.

== Reception ==
The New York Times called it "an exciting adventure". Another review said Maclean's "gift for sustained excitement is remarkable."

== Film adaptation ==
The novel was later very loosely adapted into the 1968 John Sturges film of the same name starring Rock Hudson. The most obvious changes involved the names of the novel's characters:

- The nuclear submarine Dolphin became USS Tigerfish.
- The British spy Dr. Carpenter was renamed David Jones, portrayed by Patrick McGoohan.
- Commander Swanson was changed to Commander Ferraday, portrayed by Hudson.

Additional characters were added, including a US Marine platoon trained in Arctic warfare:

- Soviet double-agent Boris Vaslov, portrayed by Ernest Borgnine
- Marine Captain Leslie Anders, portrayed by Jim Brown
- 1st Lt. Russell Walker, portrayed by Tony Bill

Much of the novel's characterisation involving the submarine's crew was jettisoned in favour of these new cinematic creations. Also all characters from the Ice Station Zebra in the novel were removed. They were claimed to have died in the fire, notably two main villains who had caused the fire in the first place. Also removed were all references to Dr. Carpenter's brother.

Beyond the name change, the film's submarine has a design similar to the first nuclear-powered submarine, Nautilus, rather than the more streamlined, teardrop-shaped vessel, either the contemporaneous Skipjack or Permit design, that was described in the novel. In the movie, the fire on the drift Ice Station was explained away as accidental.

The Soviet interest in recovering the lost spy satellite is shown early in the film when a spy ship disguised as a fishing trawler waits outside Holy Loch when the Tigerfish sets sail. The nearly fatal flooding of the forward torpedo room, before the intermission, is the only time in the film where the submarine is shown to be in jeopardy, unlike the novel where a fire in the engine room nearly kills the entire crew. The film does not show the return trip of the submarine. In the novel, the survivors of Ice Station Zebra are rescued and it is on the return trip that the saboteur of the station sets fire to the engine room in an attempt to get the satellite pictures out. The film's climax involves a superpower confrontation between Soviet paratroopers and the US Marines at Ice Station Zebra itself, but concludes on a much more ambiguous note than the novel, reflecting the perceived thaw in the Cold War following the Cuban Missile Crisis.

== Popular culture ==
The novel is referenced in the 19th episode of the second season of Perfect Strangers, “Snow Way to Treat a Lady, Part 2”. After a second avalanche during the night while everyone was sleeping, Larry wakes up in the morning in discomfort. he pulls a book from under him and reads the title "Ice Station Zebra?", and throws it aside.

The novel is referenced in "The Leadership Breakfast", the eleventh episode of the second season of The West Wing. While building a fire, Josh Lyman (played by Bradley Whitford) says, "It's like Ice Station Zebra in here."

The novel is parodied in the Sealab 2021 third-season episode, "Frozen Dinner". The Sealab crew must rescue scientists aboard Ice Station Zebra, a research station on top of an ice floe. The ice floe has turned upside down and trapped the two men, while the Sealab crew tries to rescue them in a submarine. While the scientists immediately turn to cannibalism, the Sealab sub – led by a German crew resembling that from Das Boot – predictably fumbles the rescue.

The movie adaptation of the novel is referenced in The Big Bang Theory Episode 23 of season 2 "The Monopolar Expedition".

Howard Hughes's obsession with the movie adaptation of the novel is referenced in "I Wanna Be a Boss", a 1991 song by American singer-songwriter Stan Ridgway.

In 2018 Jack White released a song with the title "Ice Station Zebra".

In the eighth episode of the second season of the American television drama series Breaking Bad, "Better Call Saul", there is a scene where the character Saul Goodman, played by Bob Odenkirk, asks his new client, Badger, played by Matt L. Jones, to send him a money order payable to "Ice Station Zebra Associates", the company name Saul Goodman uses for his loan out for tax purposes.

In the first season of the British cartoon Danger Mouse, the 11th episode "Ice Station Camel" is a clear reference to the novel.

== Sources ==
- Anderson, William R. (1959). Nautilus 90 North. Hodder & Stoughton.
- Polmar, Norman; Moore, K. J. (2004). Cold War Submarines: The Design and Construction of US and Soviet Submarines. Washington, D.C.: Potomac Books, Inc. ISBN 1-57488-530-8.
- Phil Taubman. Secret Empire: Eisenhower, the CIA, and the Hidden Story of America's Space Espionage (New York: Simon & Schuster, 2003) ISBN 0-684-85699-9
- Marion D. Williams. Submarines Under Ice: The US Navy's Polar Operations (Annapolis, Maryland: Naval Institute Press, 1998) ISBN 1-55750-943-3
