= When Eight Bells Toll =

1966 novel by Alistair MacLean

- First edition cover (UK)
- Author: Alistair MacLean
- Language: English
- Genre: Thriller novel
- Publisher: Collins (UK); Doubleday (US)
- Publication date: 1966
- Publication place: United Kingdom
- Media type: Print (hardback and paperback)
- Preceded by: Ice Station Zebra
- Followed by: Where Eagles Dare

When Eight Bells Toll is a first-person narrative novel written by Scottish author Alistair MacLean and published in 1966. It marked MacLean's return after a three-year gap, following the publication of Ice Station Zebra (1963), during which time he took a break from writing and ran several restaurants.

When Eight Bells Toll combines the genres of spy novel and detective novel. MacLean calls on his own Scottish background to authentically portray the rugged weather, people and terrain of western Scotland.

== Plot synopsis ==
Five cargo ships have been hijacked in the Irish Sea; ships carrying vast quantities of precious stones and gold bullion. The crews later turn up, but the ships have disappeared. Clearly, the hijackers are getting impeccable intelligence. The British Secret Service, under Rear-Admiral Sir Arthur Arnford-Jason (known as "Uncle Arthur") has planted agents on the ships – but only the ship's masters know of their presence. When no word is received from the agents, Phillip Calvert (who narrates the story) and Hunslett are sent to investigate.

They manage to track the latest hijacked ship – the Nantesville, carrying £8 million in gold bullion – to the Scottish Highlands and the sleepy port town of Torbay on the Island of Torbay (patterned after Tobermory, on the Isle of Mull). Under cover of being marine biologists on a UNESCO project, they travel in the Firecrest, an outwardly normal but very specially equipped motor launch. Calvert boards the ship under cover of night and finds that the two agents planted aboard have been murdered. His chief suspect is Cypriot shipping magnate Sir Anthony Skouras, whose luxury yacht, Shangri-La, is also anchored in Torbay.

Calvert barely escapes the murderous hijackers, and returns to his boat. But late at night, they are boarded by local police and plain-clothes men claiming to be customs officers seeking information on stolen chemicals. After the search and their departure, he finds the boat's well-concealed powerful radio to have been sabotaged.

While searching the surrounding area in a Fleet Air Arm Helicopter, Calvert meets the occupants of a castle, Lord Kirkside and his teenage daughter Susan, who both clearly want him well away from the castle, and a fierce gun-toting local on his private island.

As the helicopter brings Calvert back to Torbay, it comes under attack from the shore by machine-gun; and the pilot, Lieutenant Williams, is killed. The helicopter crashes, explodes and plummets into the sea. Calvert escapes from the helicopter after it sinks to the bottom. When he returns to Firecrest, he finds Hunslett is missing.

Not having received any further communications from his agents, Uncle Arthur arrives himself by commandeered RAF launch. Together, they combat boarders and make ready for sea. On trying to use a concealed radio, they find it has been stolen and Hunslett's body left in its place.

They are joined by Skouras's second wife, Charlotte, who claims to have escaped from his physical and psychological abuse of her. When a pirate speedboat approaches, Calvert rams it, shoots the occupants and blows up the boat in vengeance for Hunslett's death.

On the promise of a share of the insurance reward, Calvert recruits the assistance of Tim Hutchinson, a shark fisherman who has unrivalled knowledge of local water conditions and boat handling. Guessing that the missing bullion ships are being sunk to allow the gold to be offloaded invisibly, Calvert, formerly a marine salvage expert, dives into the bay and finds the Nantesville. He fights and kills Quinn, one of the divers, whom he has previously encountered and who he suspects killed Hunslett.

He then penetrates Kirkside's castle, disabling the guards, and questions Susan. He discovers a powerful radio transmitter and caches of gold bullion. He concludes that the castle's occupants are working under duress with the hijackers, as is the local police sergeant, whose son is being held hostage.

At midnight (eight bells) the shark fishermen ram the gates of the underground dock with their boat. The pirates are expecting them because, in a final twist, Charlotte has been transmitting Calvert's plans to them. Calvert, held at gunpoint and expecting to be killed, asks that the real story be explained to him, which Charlotte does. It emerges that Skouras is also an innocent victim of the pirates; one of several who are working under duress. His real wife is not dead, as is widely believed, but in a French nursing home – Charlotte Meiner is her cousin and also under threat.

The standoff is broken by the sudden but pre-planned arrival of a detachment of Royal Marine Commandos. The pirates are disarmed and the several hostages are freed.

Calvert tells Charlotte that he didn't believe her story, and that he knew from the beginning that she was faking, with information received from Uncle Arthur.

Calvert is a typical MacLean hero, world-weary and sometimes cynical, yet ultimately honorable, who must battle bureaucracy as well as the bad guys to solve the crime. Calvert's frantic search for the hijackers and for the hostages they hold takes him over the remote isles and sea lochs and forces him to make allies of some unlikely locals. As is usual with MacLean, the plot twists and turns, not all characters are as they seem to be at first introduction, and the double-crosses continue to the very last page.

== Adaptations and uses in other media ==
- When Eight Bells Toll (1971 film) was directed by Étienne Périer and starred Anthony Hopkins as Calvert, Robert Morley as Uncle Arthur, Jack Hawkins as Skouras, and Nathalie Delon as Charlotte
- In the Bollywood film Aradhana (1969), while Rajesh Khanna sang "Mere Sapno Ki Rani Kab Aayegi Tu" to Sharmila Tagore, Sharmila was trying to read When Eight Bells Toll
