= Hohenwerfen Castle =

11th century castle by Werfen, Austria

Coordinates: 47°28′55″N 13°11′16″E

- Festung Hohenwerfen
- Werfen, Salzburg, Austria
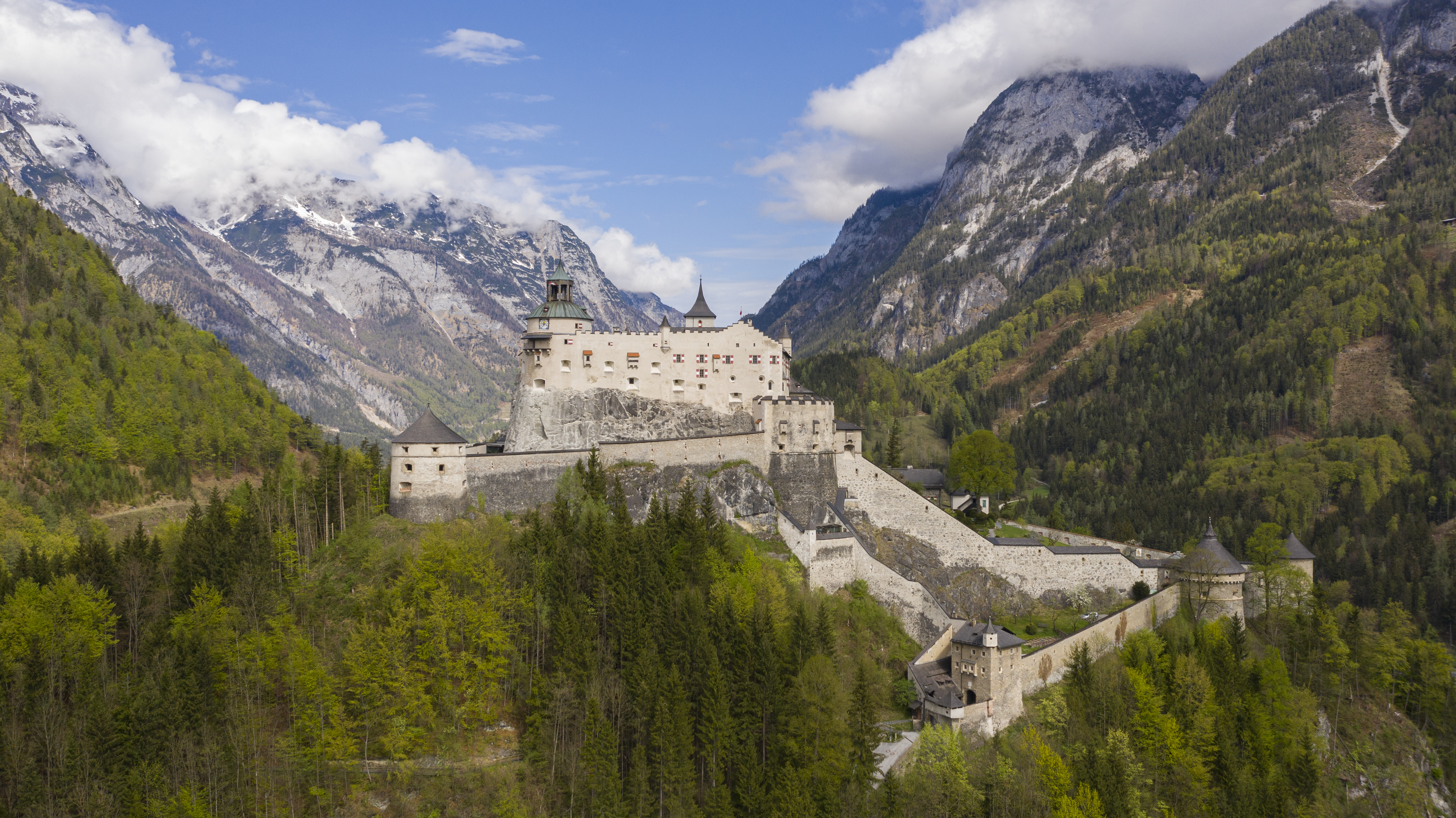
- Burg Hohenwerfen

Site information
- Open to the public: Yes
- Condition: Preserved

Site history
- Built: 1075–1078
- Built by: Archbishop Gebhard of Salzburg

Hohenwerfen Castle (German: Festung Hohenwerfen, lit. 'Hohenwerfen Fortress') is a medieval rock castle, situated at an altitude of 623 metres (2,044 ft), on a 155-metre (509 ft) rock pillar overlooking the Austrian market town of Werfen in the Salzach valley, approximately 40 kilometres (25 mi) south of Salzburg. The fortress is surrounded by the Berchtesgaden Alps and the adjacent Tennen Mountains. Hohenwerfen is a "sister" of Hohensalzburg Fortress, both built by the Archbishops of Salzburg in the 11th century.

The castle became known internationally as the main location in the film Where Eagles Dare.

== History ==
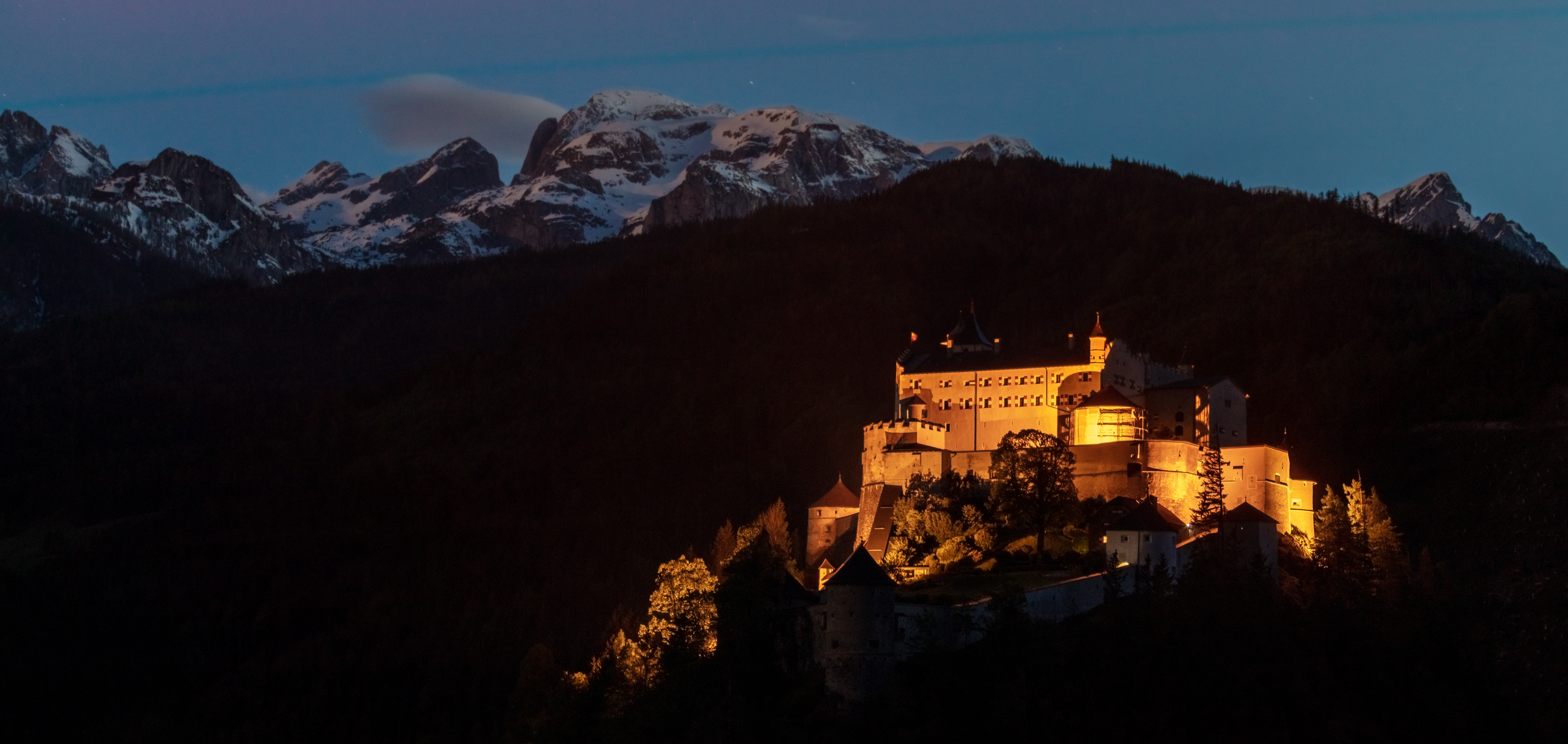
Night view

The fortification was built between 1075 and 1078 at the behest of Archbishop Gebhard of Salzburg during the Imperial Investiture Controversy, meant as a strategic bulwark atop a 155-metre (509 ft) high rock. Gebhard, an ally of Pope Gregory VII and the anti-king Rudolf of Rheinfelden, had three major castles extended to secure the route across the Eastern Alps along the Salzach river against the forces of King Henry IV of Germany: Hohenwerfen, Hohensalzburg and Petersberg Castle at Friesach in Carinthia. Nevertheless, King Henry had Gebhard expelled in 1077 and the archbishop could not return to Salzburg until 1086, only to die at Hohenwerfen two years later.

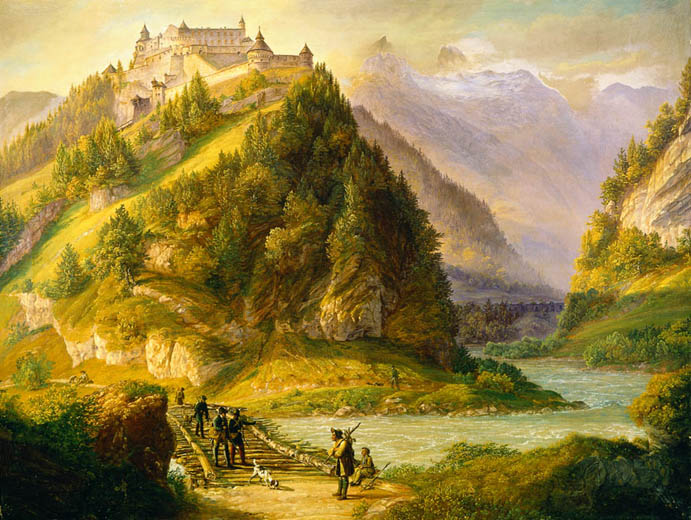
Johann Michael Sattler: Festung Hohenwerfen, 1827/28

In the following centuries Hohenwerfen served Salzburg's rulers, the prince-archbishops, not only as a military base but also as a residence and hunting retreat. The fortress was extended in the 12th century and to a lesser extent again in the 16th century during the German Peasants' War, when in 1525 and 1526 riotous farmers and miners from the south of Salzburg moved towards the city, laying fire and severely damaging the castle.

Shot from the castle, overlooking the gardens. 2019

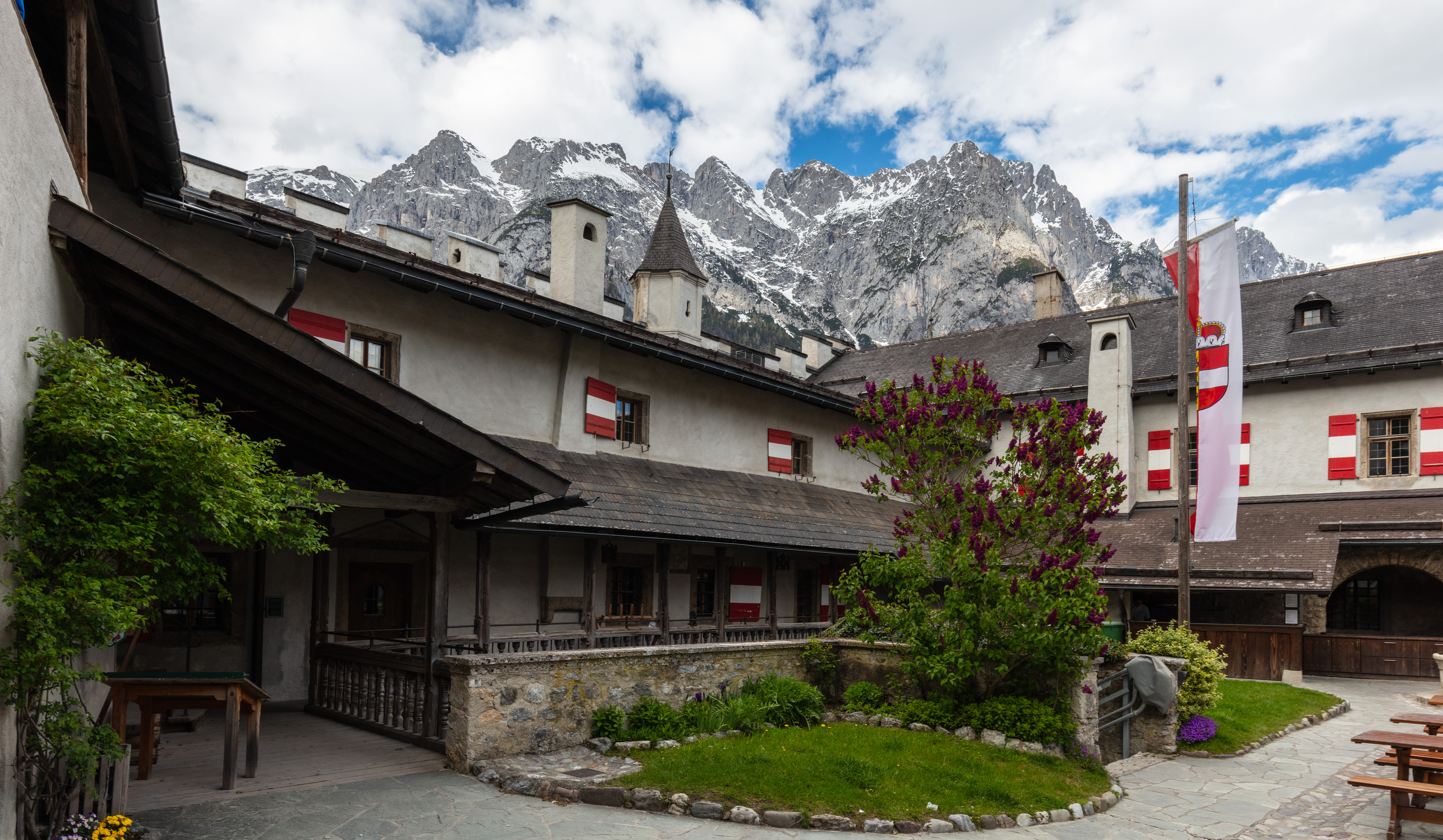
Courtyard. 2019

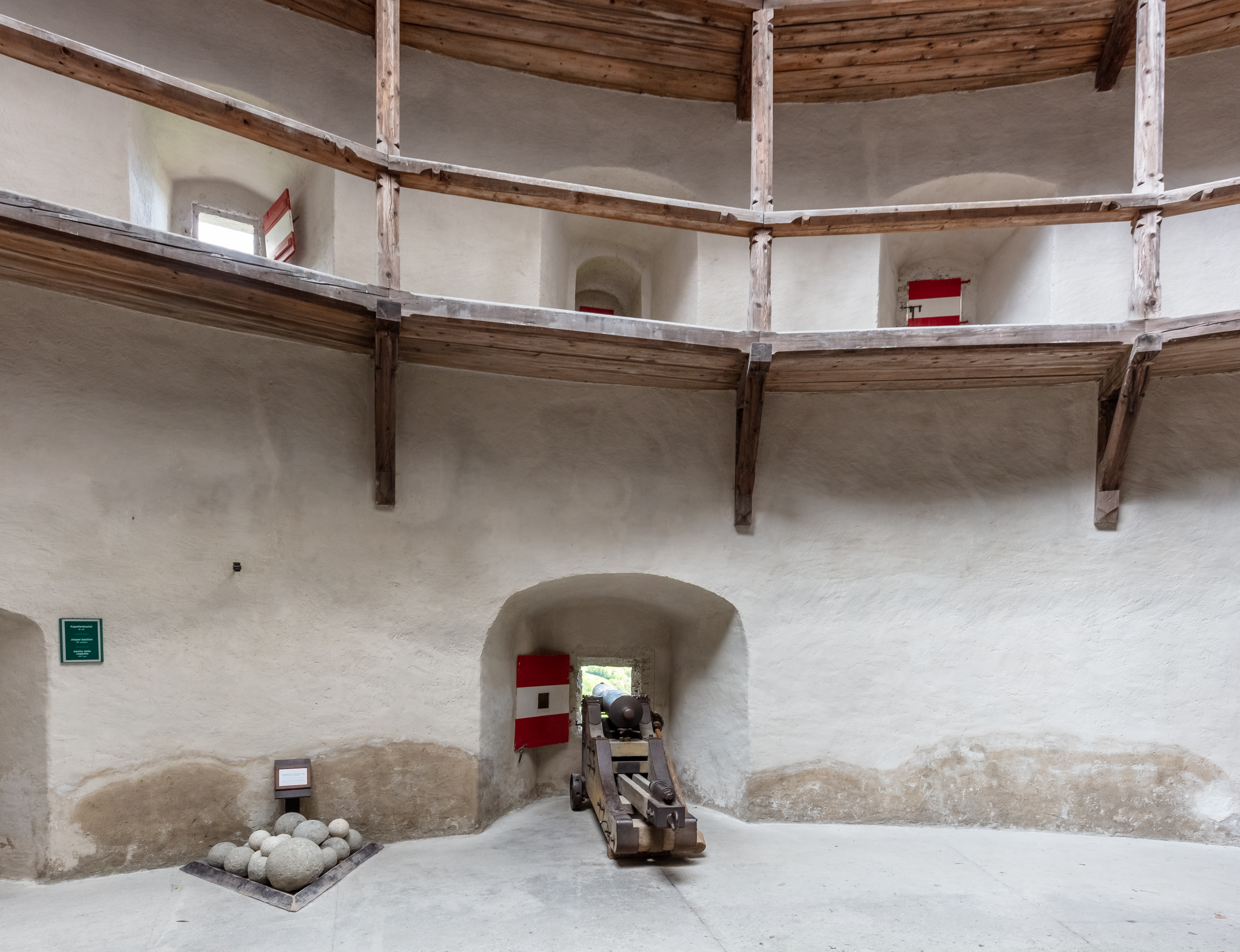
Cannon

Alternatively it was used as a state prison and therefore had a somewhat sinister reputation. Its prison walls have witnessed the tragic fate of many 'criminals' who spent their days there – maybe their last – under inhumane conditions, and, periodically, various highly ranked noblemen have also been imprisoned there including rulers such as Archbishop Adalbert III, arrested by his own ministeriales in 1198; Count Albert of Friesach (in 1253); the Styrian governor Siegmund von Dietrichstein, captured by insurgent peasants in 1525; and Prince-Archbishop Wolf Dietrich Raitenau, who died here in 1617 after six years of imprisonment.

In 1931 the fortress, owned by Archduke Eugen of Austria since 1898, was again damaged by a fire and, though largely restored, finally had to be sold to the Salzburg Reichsgau administration in 1938. In World War II, the castle served as a Gauführerschule, a Nazi education camp opened on 5 March 1939 by Salzburg's Gauleiter Friedrich Rainer and active during World War II. After the war it was used as a training camp by the Austrian Gendarmerie (rural police) until 1987.

Currently, the bastion functions as a museum. Among the numerous attractions offered by the fortress are guided tours showing its extensive weapons collection, the historical Salzburg Falconry with the falconry museum as well as a fortress tavern. The historic Falconry Centre is a special attraction, offering daily flight demonstrations using various birds of prey, including eagles, falcons, hawks, and vultures.

== Owners ==
Formerly the castle belonged to the House of Habsburg. The estate is now owned by the state of Salzburg.

== In popular culture ==
- In the 1968 film Where Eagles Dare the castle featured as the fictional Schloß Adler that is raided by a S.O.E. paratroop team during World War II.
- In the Amazon Video original series The Man in the High Castle (2015) the castle was used as the Führer's headquarters.
- The castle can be seen in the background of the "Do-Re-Mi" picnic scene in The Sound of Music starring Julie Andrews, which was filmed on a hillside showing the village of Werfen.
- In the video game Call of Duty: Black Ops III, the zombies map "Der Eisendrache" is based on 'Hohenwerfen Castle'.
