= Eisriesenwelt =

Limestone and ice cave in Austria

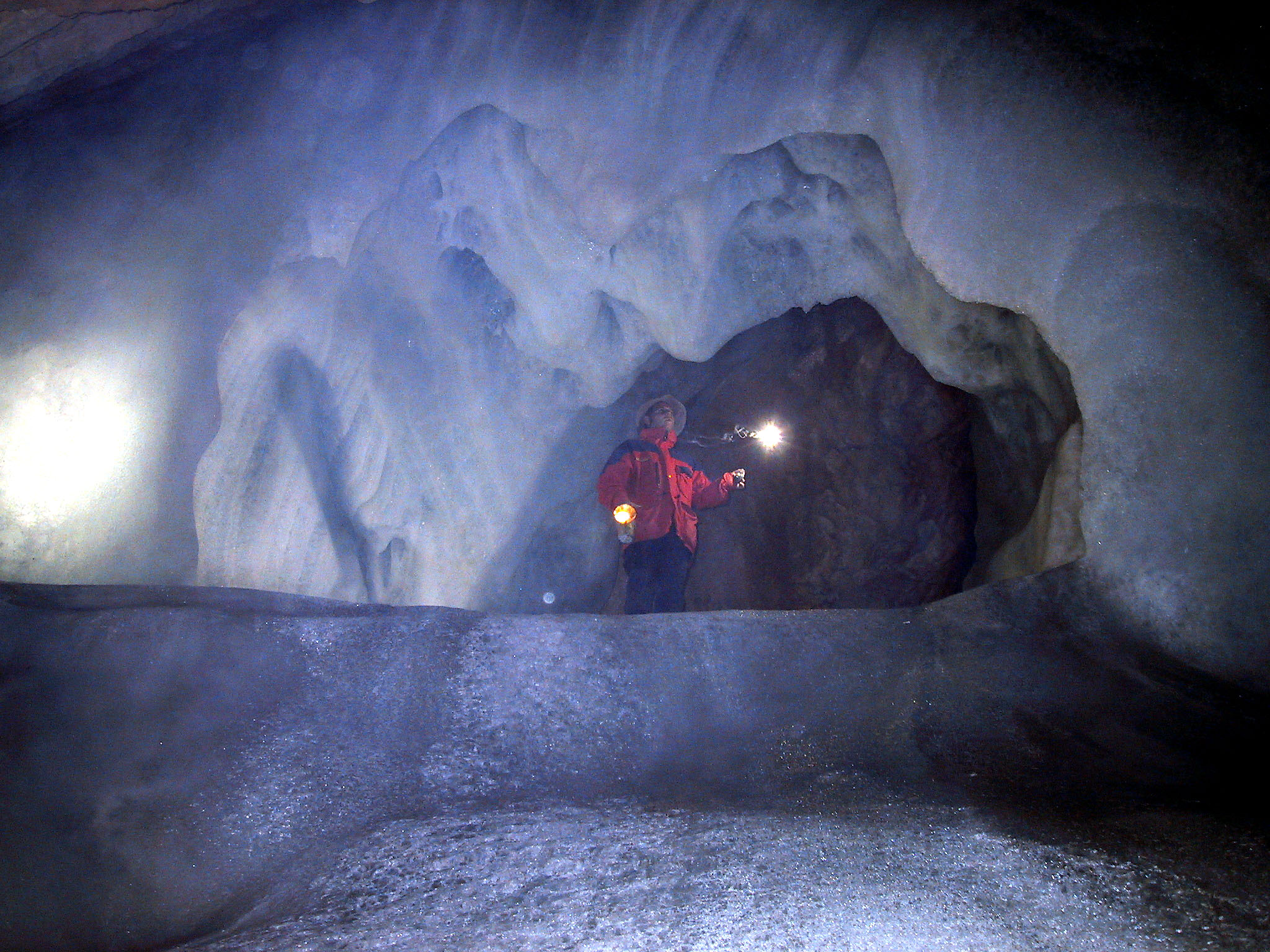
- The interior of the caves

- Location within Austria
- Interactive map of Eisriesenwelt
- Location: Werfen (Salzburg, Austria)
- Coordinates: 47°30′11″N 13°11′25″E
- Length: 42 km
- Elevation: 1,656 m
- Discovery: 1879
- Geology: Ice cave
- Entrances: 1
- Access: Public
- Show cave opened: 1920
- Show cave length: 1,000 m
- Visitors: 200,000 (by year)
- Website: Official website

The Eisriesenwelt (German for 'World of the Ice Giants') is a natural limestone and ice cave located in Werfen, Austria, about 40 km south of Salzburg. The cave is inside the Hochkogel mountain in the Tennengebirge section of the Alps. It is the largest ice cave in the world, extending more than 42 km and visited by about 200,000 tourists every year.

== Geology ==
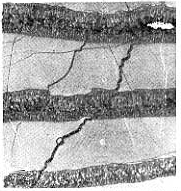
Layers of zebra limestone under the cave

The Tennengebirge mountains were formed during the late Tertiary period, during the Würm glaciation period of the Pleistocene. The mountain range, one of the massifs in the Austrian Alps, is the largest karst plateau in the Salzburger Alps, and the Eisriesenwelt is located at the rim of this plateau. Although the cave has a length of 42 km, only the first kilometer, the area that tourists are allowed to visit, is covered in ice. The rest of the cave is formed of limestone.

Eisriesenwelt was formed by the Salzach river, which eroded passageways into the mountain. The ice formations in the cave were formed by thawing snow which drained into the cave and froze during winter.

Since the entrance to the caves is open year-round, chilly winter winds blow into the cave and freeze the snow inside. In summer, a cold wind from inside the cave blows toward the entrance and prevents the formations from melting.

== History ==
The first official discovery of Eisriesenwelt was by Anton Posselt, a natural scientist from Salzburg, in 1879, though he only explored the first two hundred meters of the cave. Before his discovery, the cave was known only to locals, who, believing that it was an entrance to Hell, refused to explore it. In 1880, Posselt published his findings in a mountaineering magazine, but the report was quickly forgotten.

Alexander von Mörk, a speleologist from Salzburg, was one of the few people who remembered Posselt's discovery. He led several expeditions into the caves beginning in 1912, which were soon followed by other explorers. Von Mörk was killed in World War I in 1914, and an urn containing his ashes is inside a niche in the cave. In 1920, a cabin for the explorers, Forscherhütte, was built and the first routes up the mountain were established. Tourists began to arrive after. Later another cabin, the Dr. Oedl House, and paths from Werfen and Tenneck were constructed.

In 1955 a cable car was built, shortening the 90-minute climb to 3 minutes. Today the Eisriesenwelt cave is owned by the National Austrian Forest Commission, which has leased it to the Salzburg Association of Cave Exploration since 1928. The Forest Commission still receives a percentage of the entrance fees.

== Visiting ==
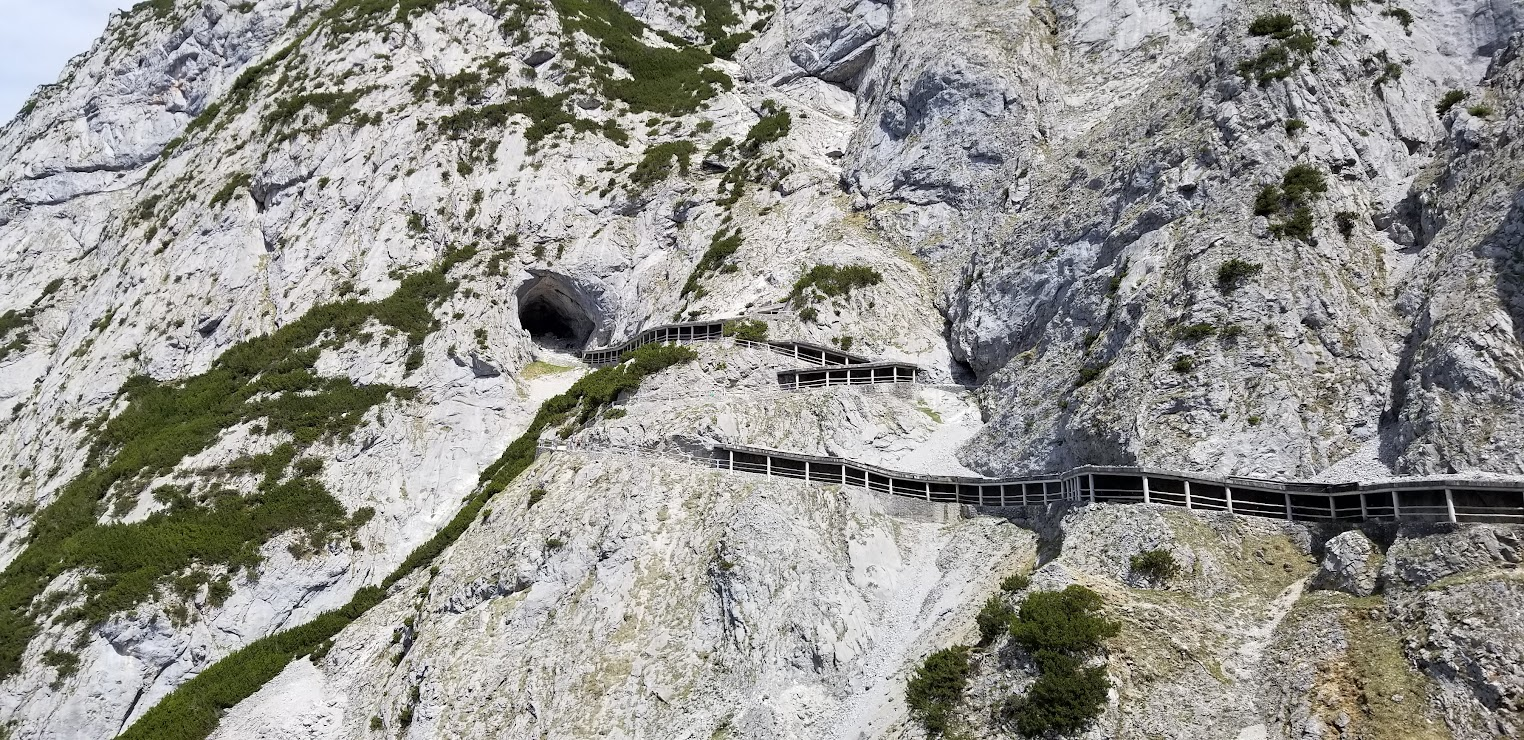
Eisriesenwelt Ice Cave Entrance

The cave operates annually from May 1 to October 26. Operating hours are 9:00 a.m. to 4:30 p.m. during July and August, and 9:00 a.m. to 3:30 p.m. during May, June, September, and October. Internal temperatures remain below freezing, and winter clothing is required. Photography is prohibited inside the cave.

The guided route begins at the entrance and proceeds to Posselt Hall, which features the Posselt Tower stalagmite. The path then passes an ashen cross marking Anton Posselt’s furthest point of exploration. Beyond this point lies the Great Ice Embankment, a 25-meter-high formation representing the area of greatest ice growth. The tour continues past Hymir's Castle—named after a giant in Norse mythology—where stalactites form Frigga's Veil, also known as the Ice Organ. Visitors then enter the Alexander von Mörk Cathedral, which holds von Mörk's ashes. The final destination is the Ice Palace, located one kilometer into the cave and 400 meters underground. Visitors return along the same path to the entrance. The round-trip tour lasts approximately one hour and 15 minutes.

== Gallery ==
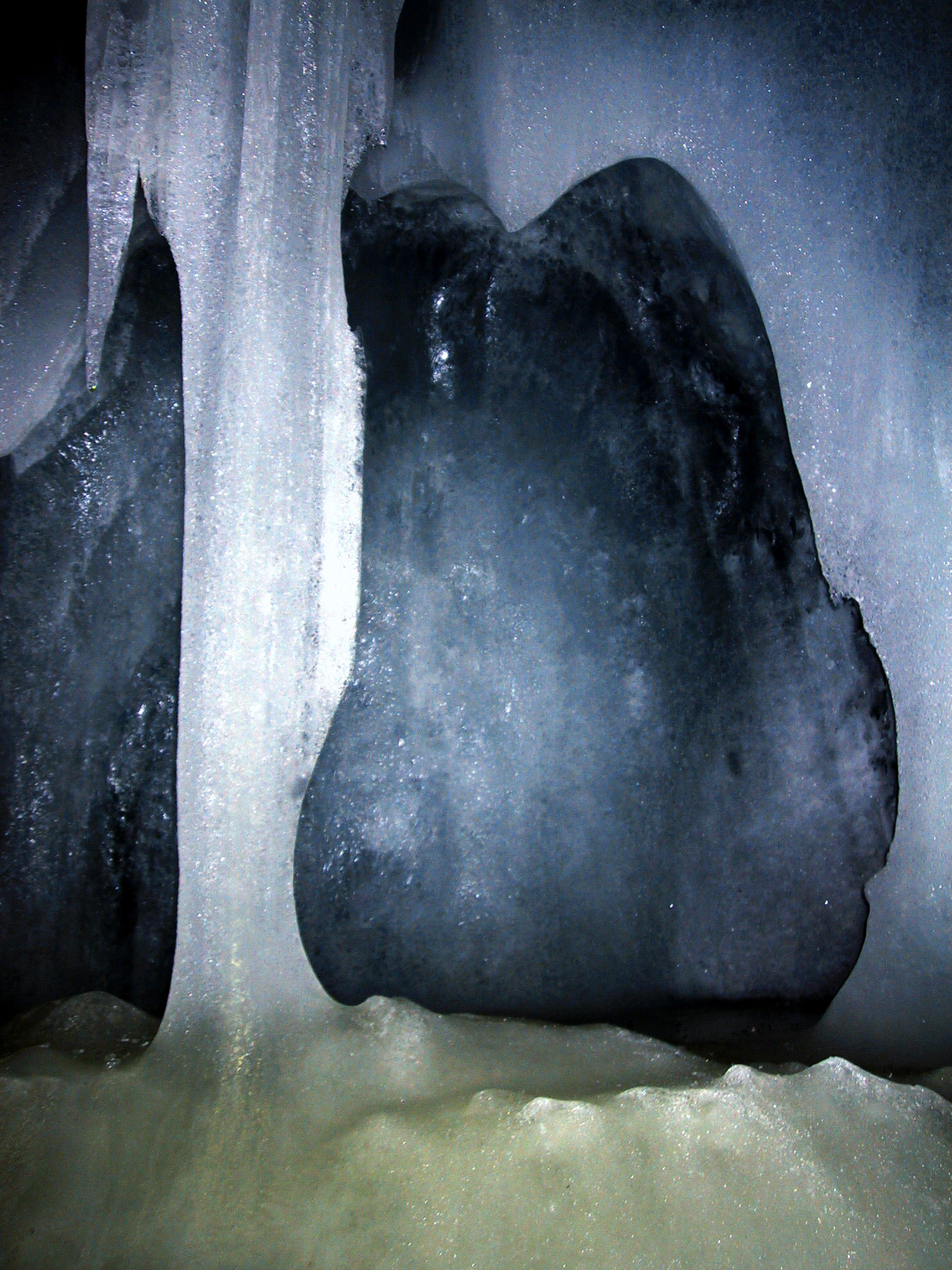
A closeup of one of the ice formations.

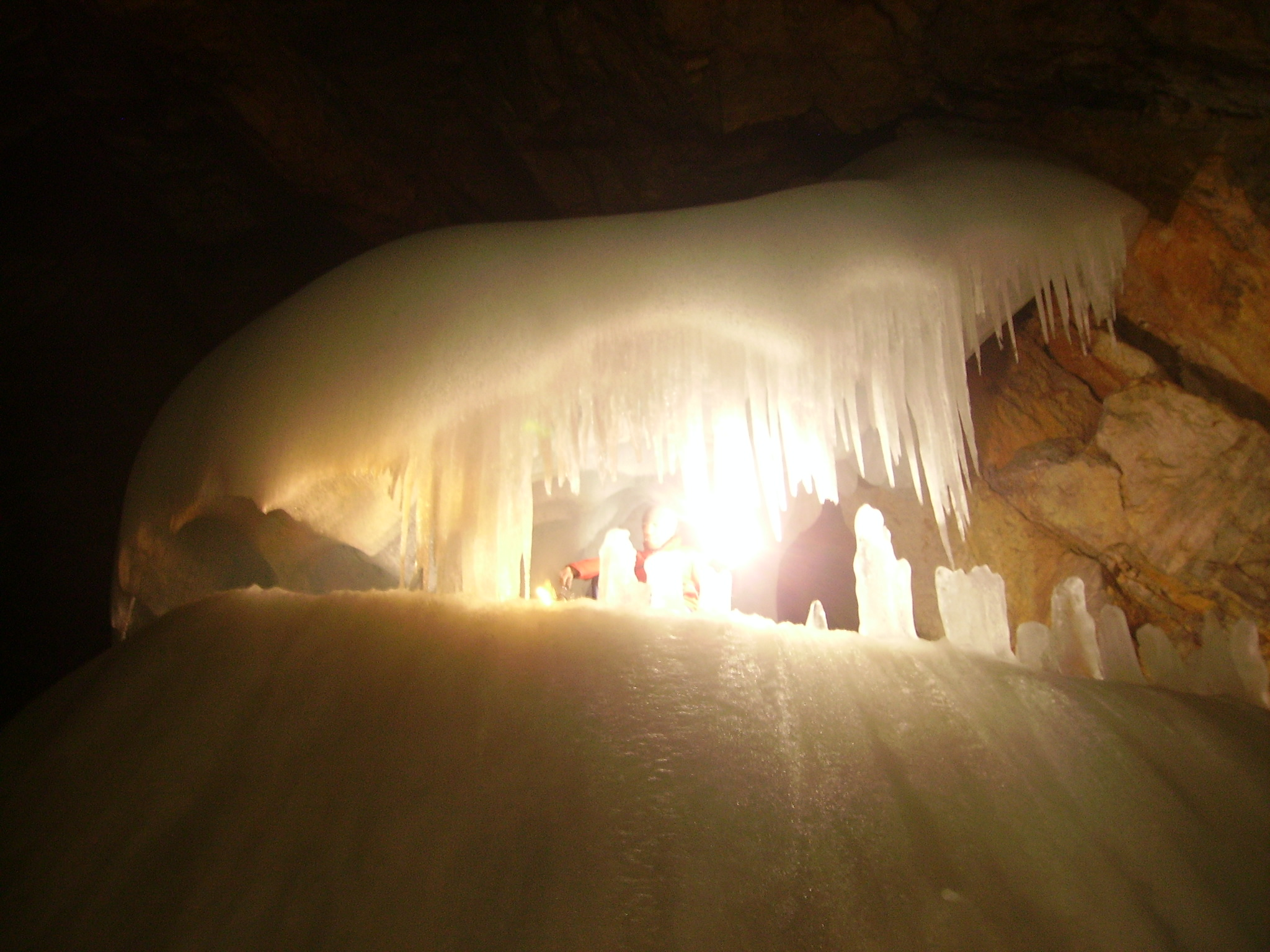
Ice formations.

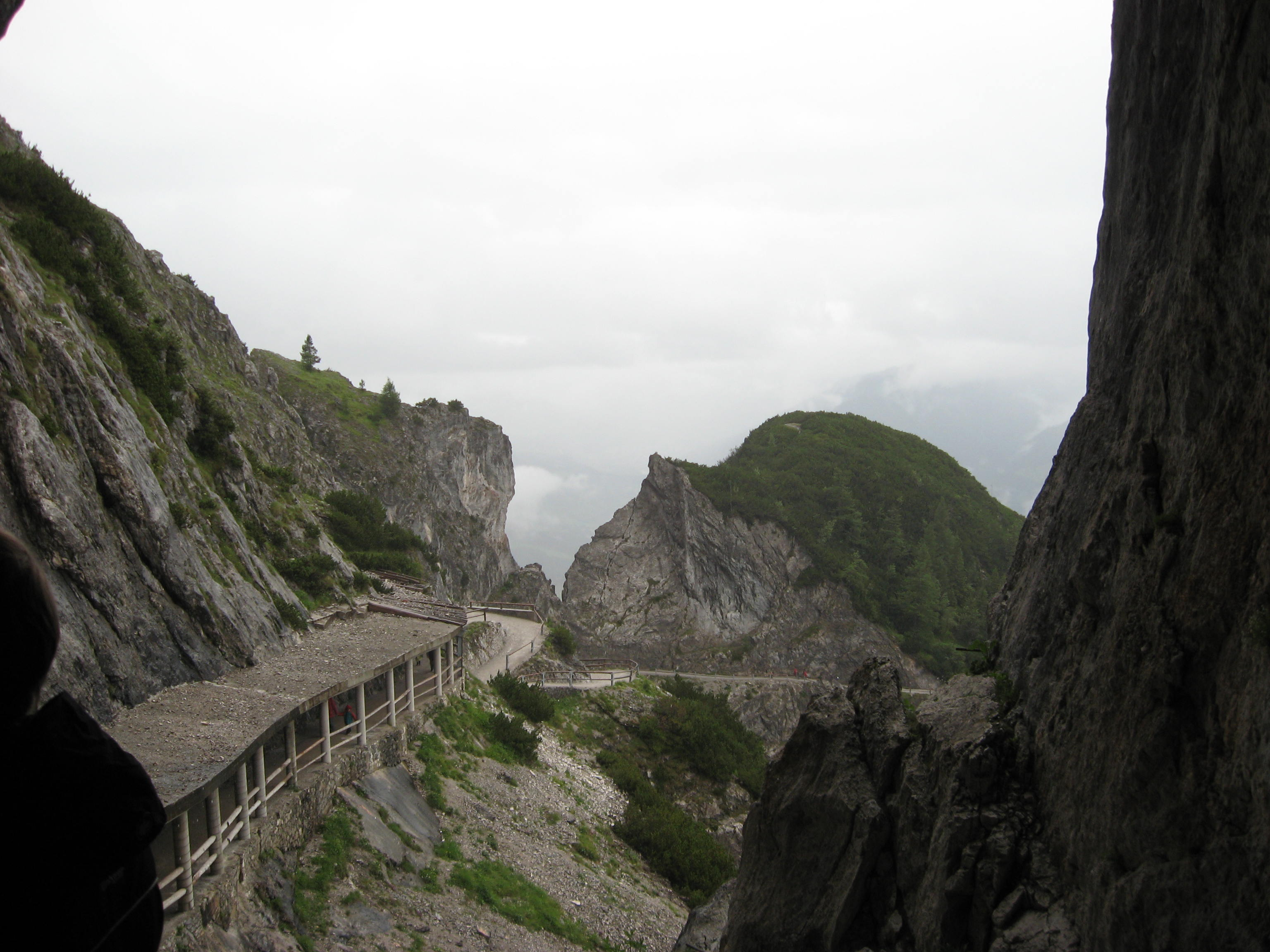
Looking down from the cave onto the trail, which is the only way of access to the cave.

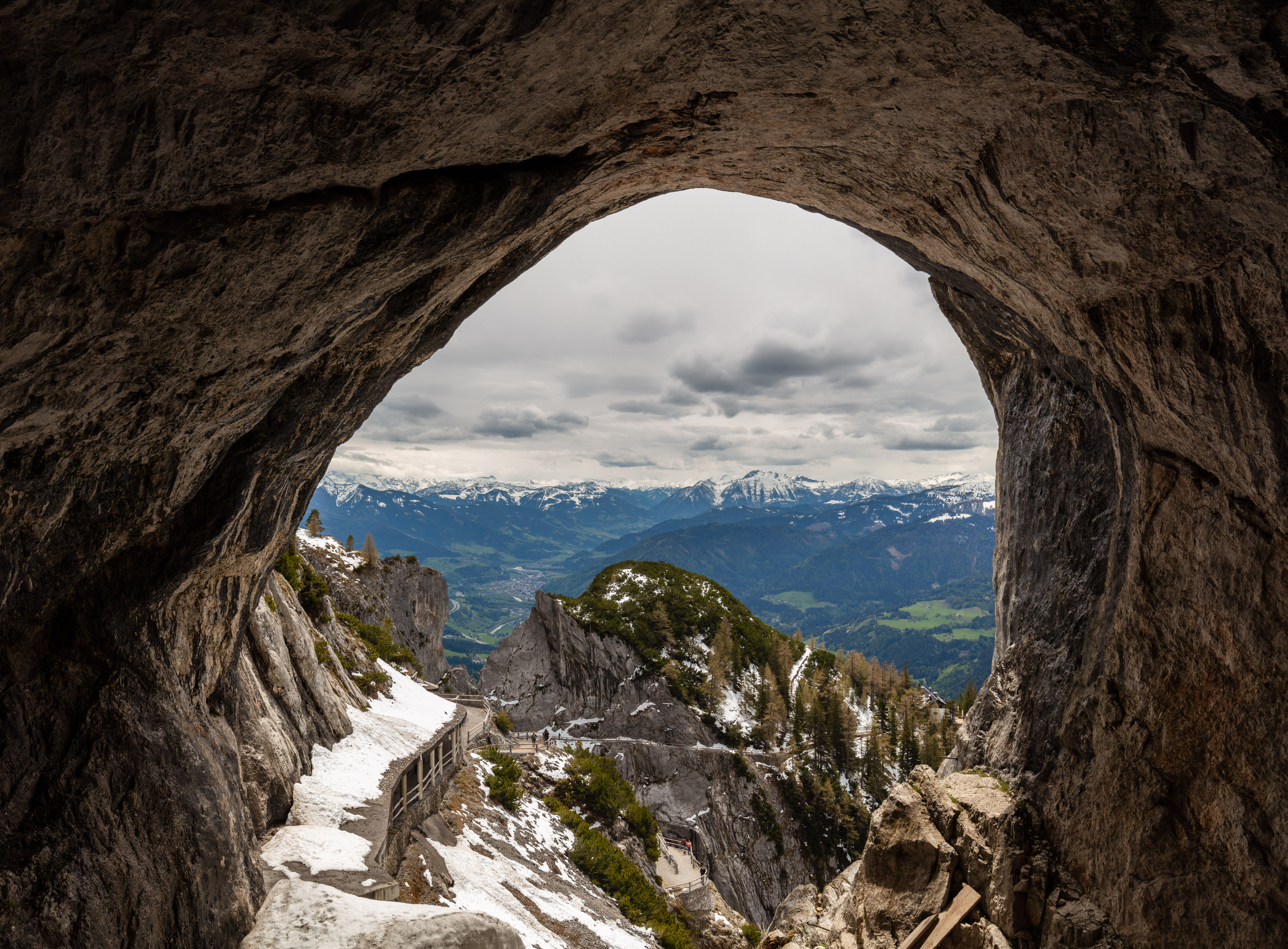
View of the landscape from the cave.

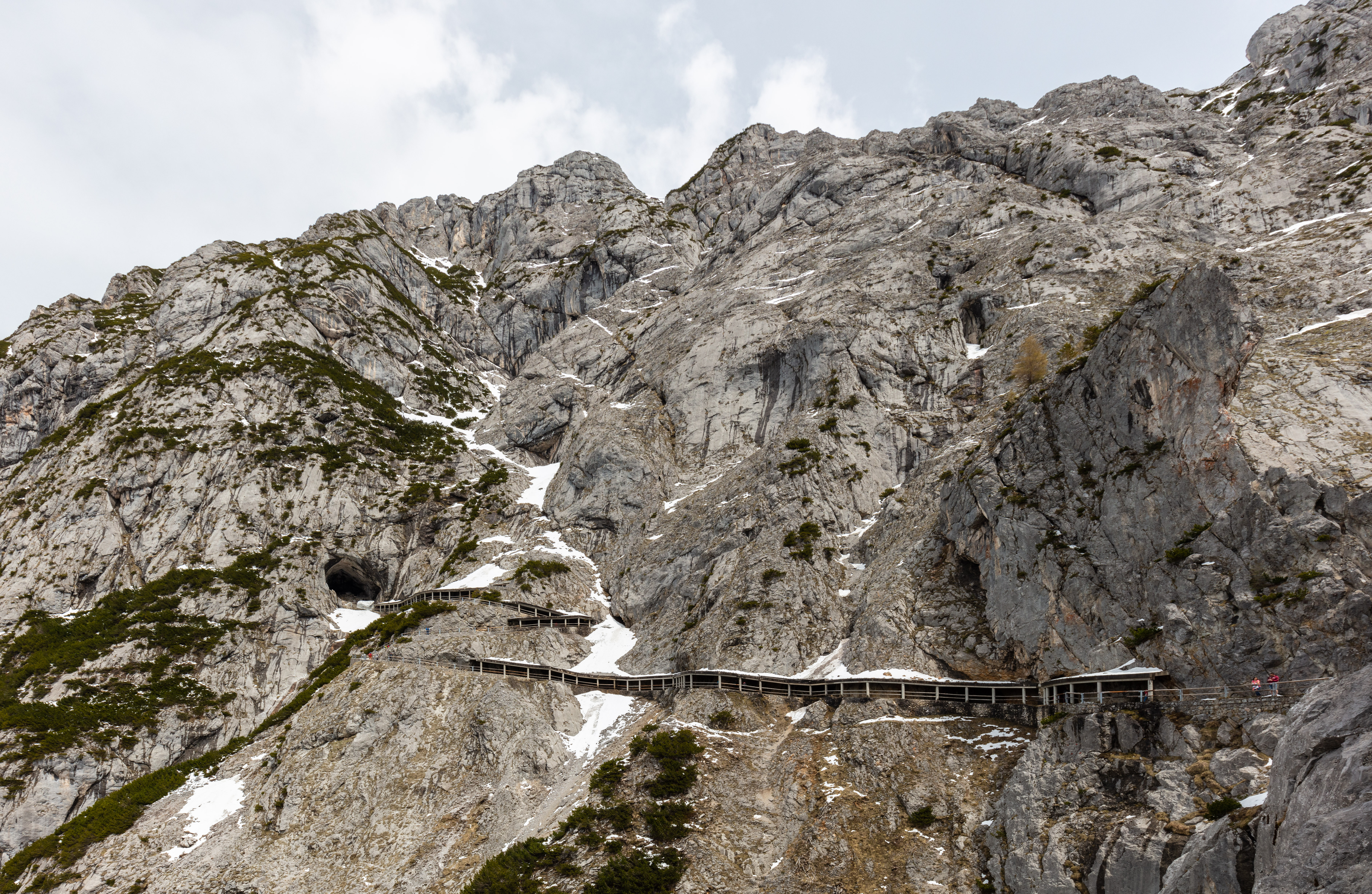
Access to the cave.
