= Werfen =

- Municipality
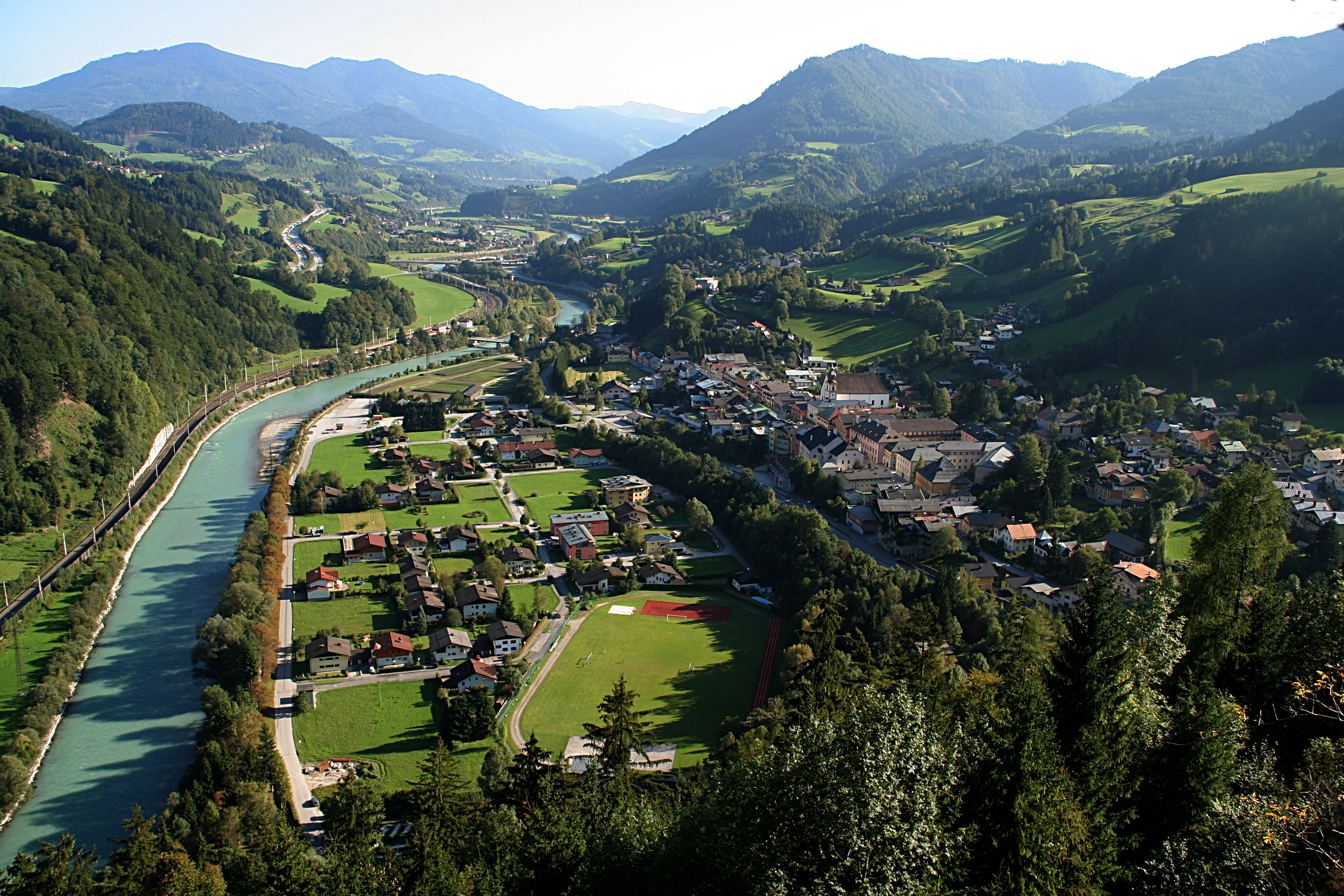
- View from Hohenwerfen Castle

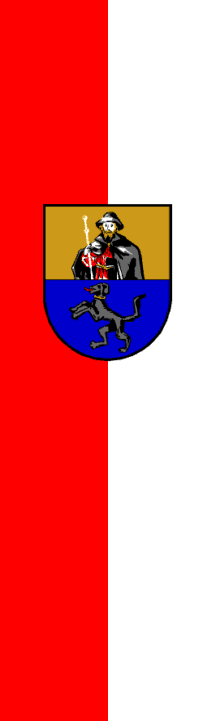
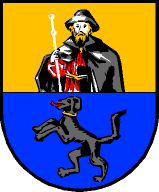
- Flag Coat of arms

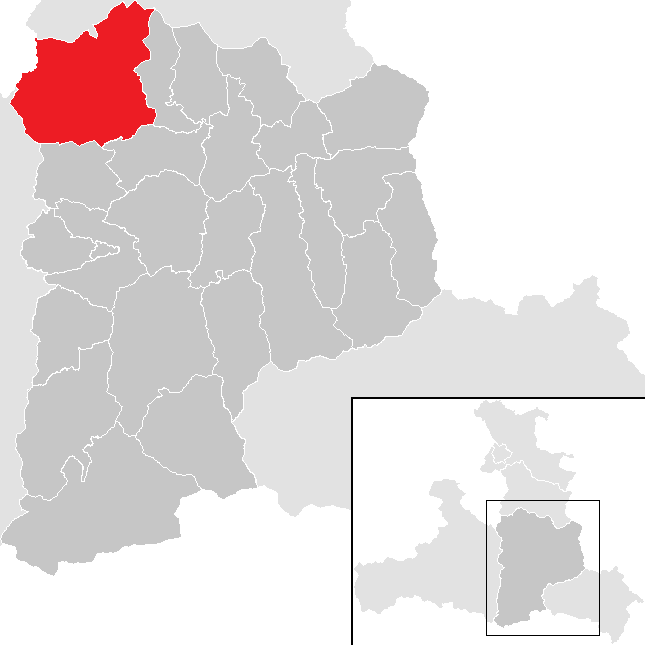
- Werfen in Pongau district

- Location within Austria
- Coordinates: 47°28′30″N 13°11′20″E
- Country: Austria
- State: Salzburg
- District: St. Johann im Pongau

Government
  - Mayor: Hubert Stock (ÖVP)

Area
  - Total: 153.99 km^{2} (59.46 sq mi)
- Elevation: 548 m (1,798 ft)

Population (2018-01-01)
  - Total: 3,027
  - Density: 19.66/km^{2} (50.91/sq mi)
- Time zone: UTC+1 (CET)
  - Summer (DST): UTC+2 (CEST)
- Postal code: 5450
- Area code: 06468
- Vehicle registration: JO
- Website: Official website

Werfen (German pronunciation: [ˈvɛɐ̯fn̩]) is a market town in the district of St. Johann im Pongau, in the Austrian state of Salzburg. It is mainly known for medieval Hohenwerfen Castle and the Eisriesenwelt ice cave, the largest in the world.

== Geography ==
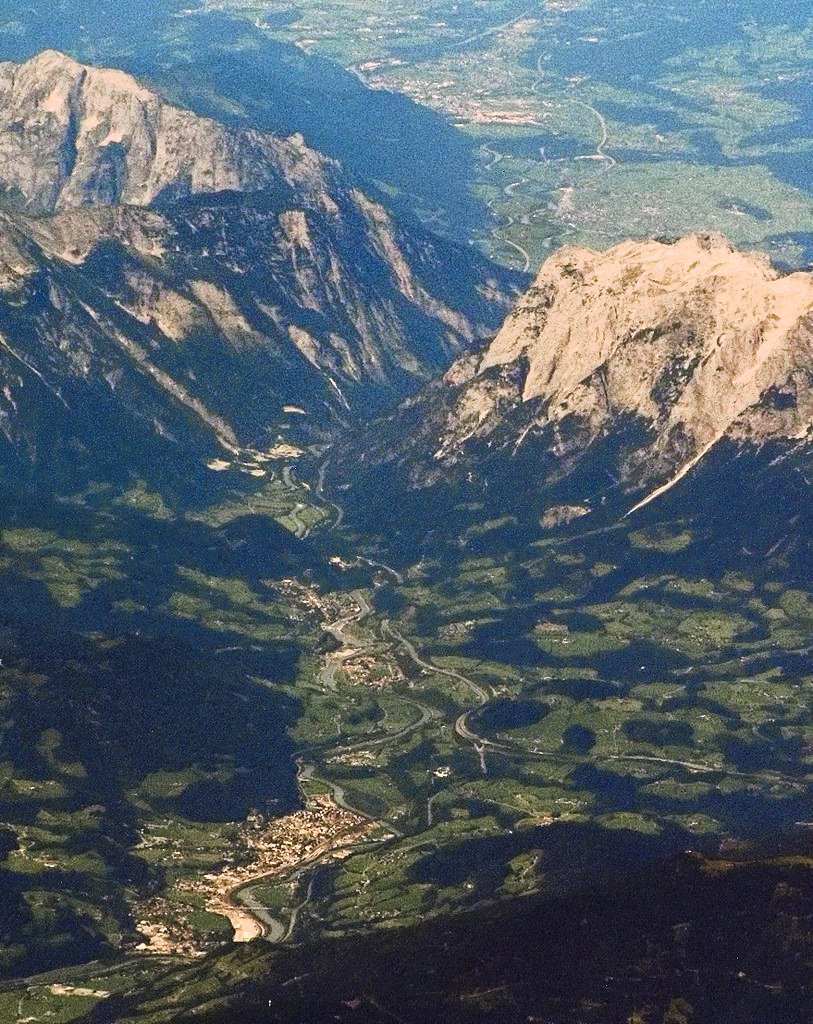
Aerial view of the Salzach valley

Werfen is located in the northwest of the historic Pongau region, about 40 km (25 mi) south of the city of Salzburg. The settlement is situated in the Salzach valley south of the Lueg Pass, between the Berchtesgaden Alps (Hagen Mountains and the Hochkönig massif) in the west and the Tennen Mountains in the east. The Salzburg-Tyrol Railway line (Giselabahn) and the Tauern Autobahn run parallel to the river. The region is known as the type locality of the geologic Werfen Formation, a Triassic stone layer of the Limestone Alps.

The municipality comprises the cadastral communities (Katastralgemeinden) of Reitsam, Scharten, Sulzau, Werfen Markt, and Wimm.

== History ==
Important trade routes passed through the Salzach valley since ancient times, when the area was part of the Roman Noricum province. Werven was first mentioned about 1140 AD. The settlement arose south of Hohenwerfen Castle, erected from 1075 at the behest of the Archbishop Gebhard of Salzburg during the Investiture Controversy with King Henry IV of Germany. It is one of the oldest markets in the former Archbishopric of Salzburg, with market privileges documented since 1425. At about the same time, the nearby parish of Pfarrwerfen was established, like the neighbouring settlement of Werfenweng in the east.

Parish church

As the seat of the local administration, Werfen and the castle were heavily attacked during the German Peasants' War in 1525/26. From 1675 onwards, numerous people in the environment of the local knacker Barbara Koller and her son Jakob were sentenced and executed in the Zaubererjackl witch trials. Werfen was also a centre of the expulsion of Salzburg Protestants under the rule of Prince-Archbishop Count Leopold Anton von Firmian in 1731. In the late 18th century, a large limonite deposit was developed in Sulzau, which from 1770 became the most important ironworks (Konkordiahütte) in the Salzburg archbishopric.

With the lands of the secularised prince-archbishopric, Werfen finally fell to the Austrian Empire by resolution of the Vienna Congress in 1816. The Salzburg-Tyrol Railway line from Salzburg to Wörgl opened in 1875, with stations in Sulzau, Tenneck, and Werfen.

The secluded Blühnbach Valley above the village of Tenneck is the site of the Baroque Schloss Blühnbach, a former hunting lodge of Archbishop Wolf Dietrich Raitenau, which in 1908 was acquired by Archduke Franz Ferdinand of Austria. After the archduke's assassination in 1914, the Habsburg-Lorraine dynasty sold the castle to the German Krupp industrial magnates. The Krupp dynasty held the premises until the death of Arndt von Bohlen und Halbach in 1986, today the estates are privately owned by Frederick R. Koch.

A small portion of a picnic scene from The Sound of Music was filmed on a hillside of the village of Werfen. Julie Andrews and crew filmed the opening shots of the "Do-Re-Mi" sequence with Hohenwerfen Castle in the background. Hohenwerfen was also the location for some filming of Where Eagles Dare.

== Politics ==
Seats in the municipal council (Gemeinderat) as of 2019 local elections:

- Austrian People's Party (ÖVP): 10
- Social Democratic Party of Austria (SPÖ): 6
- Freedom Party of Austria (FPÖ): 3

== Gallery ==
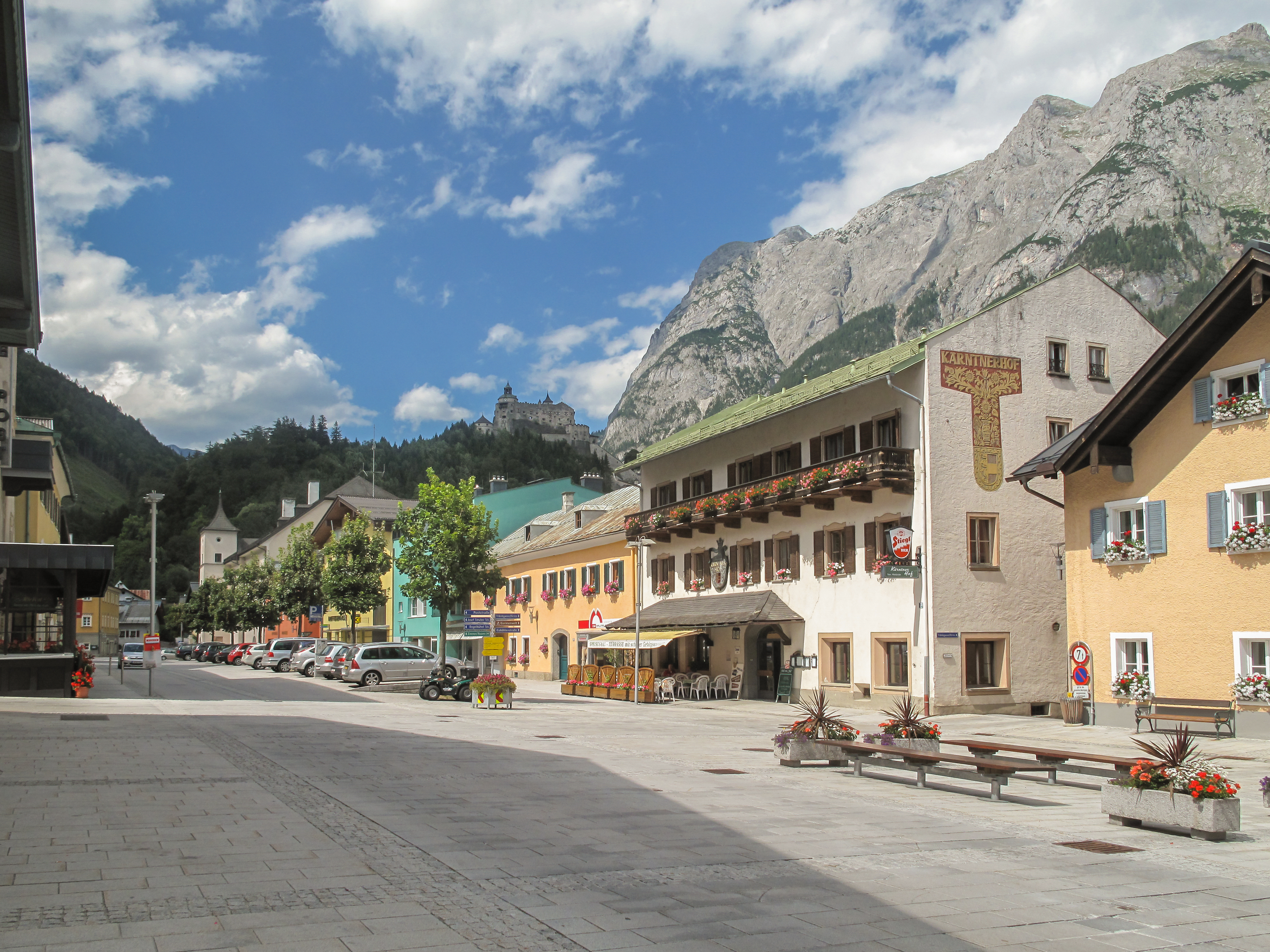
Main square

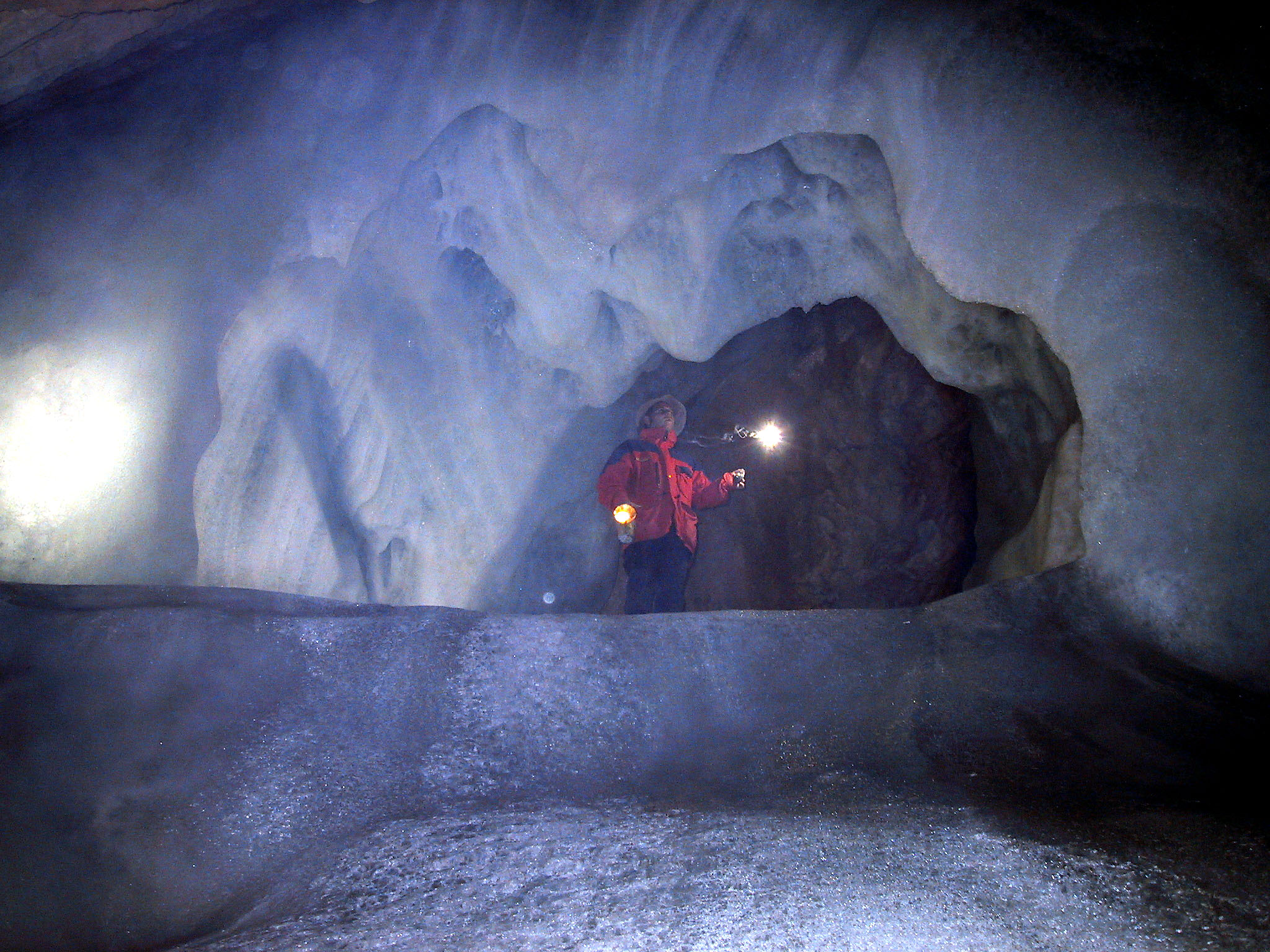
Eisriesenwelt Cave

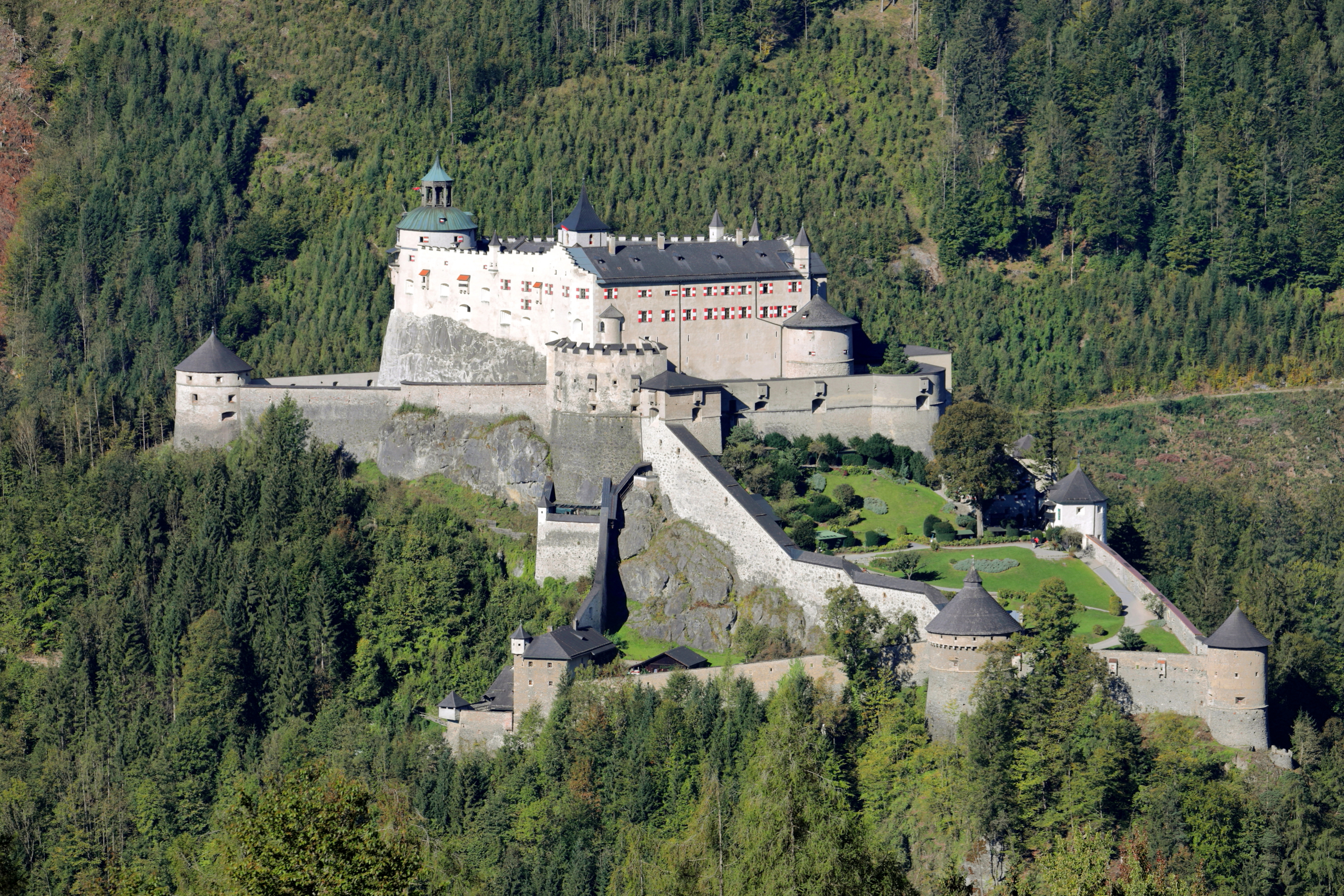
Hohenwerfen Castle

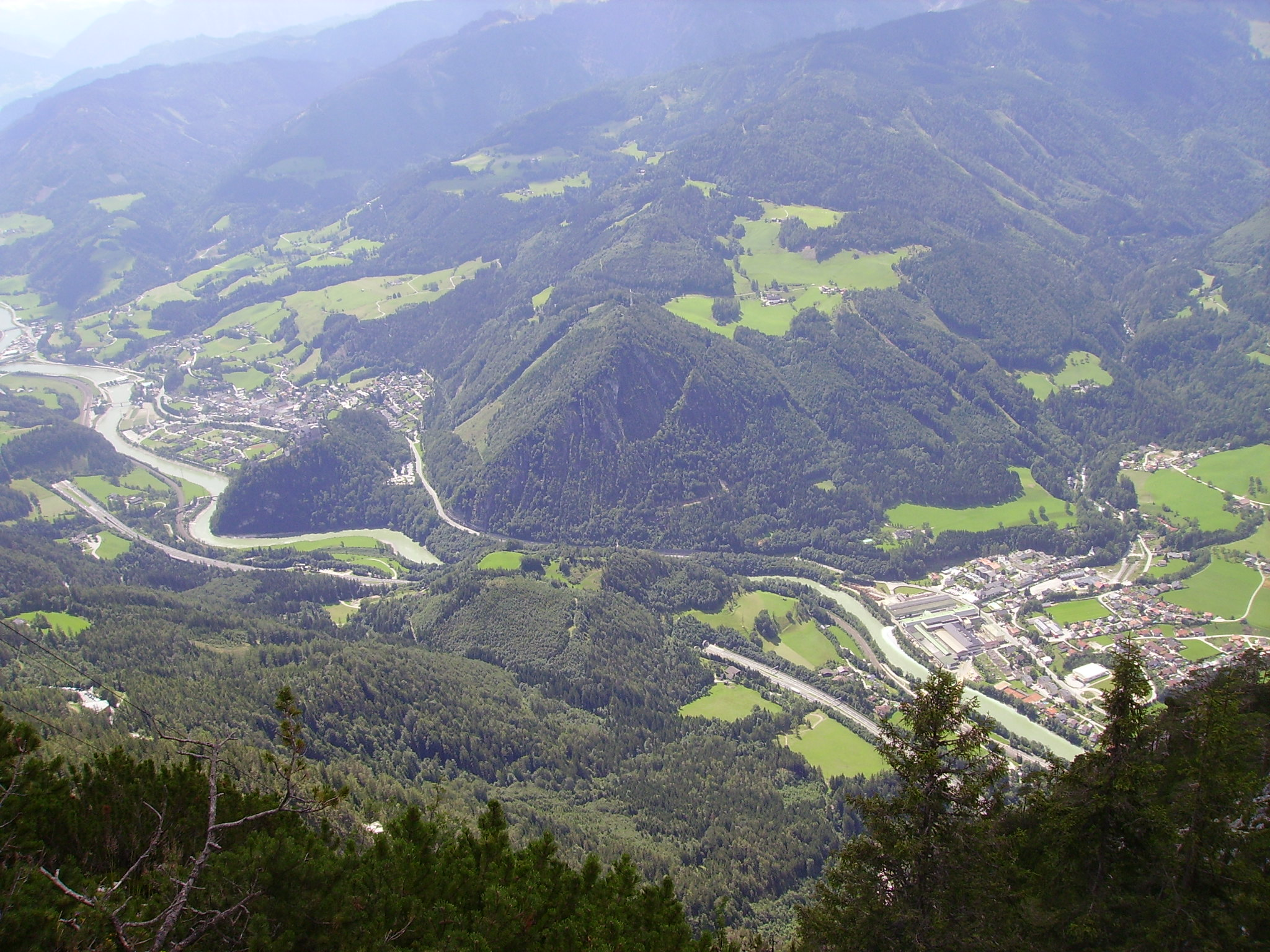
View from above

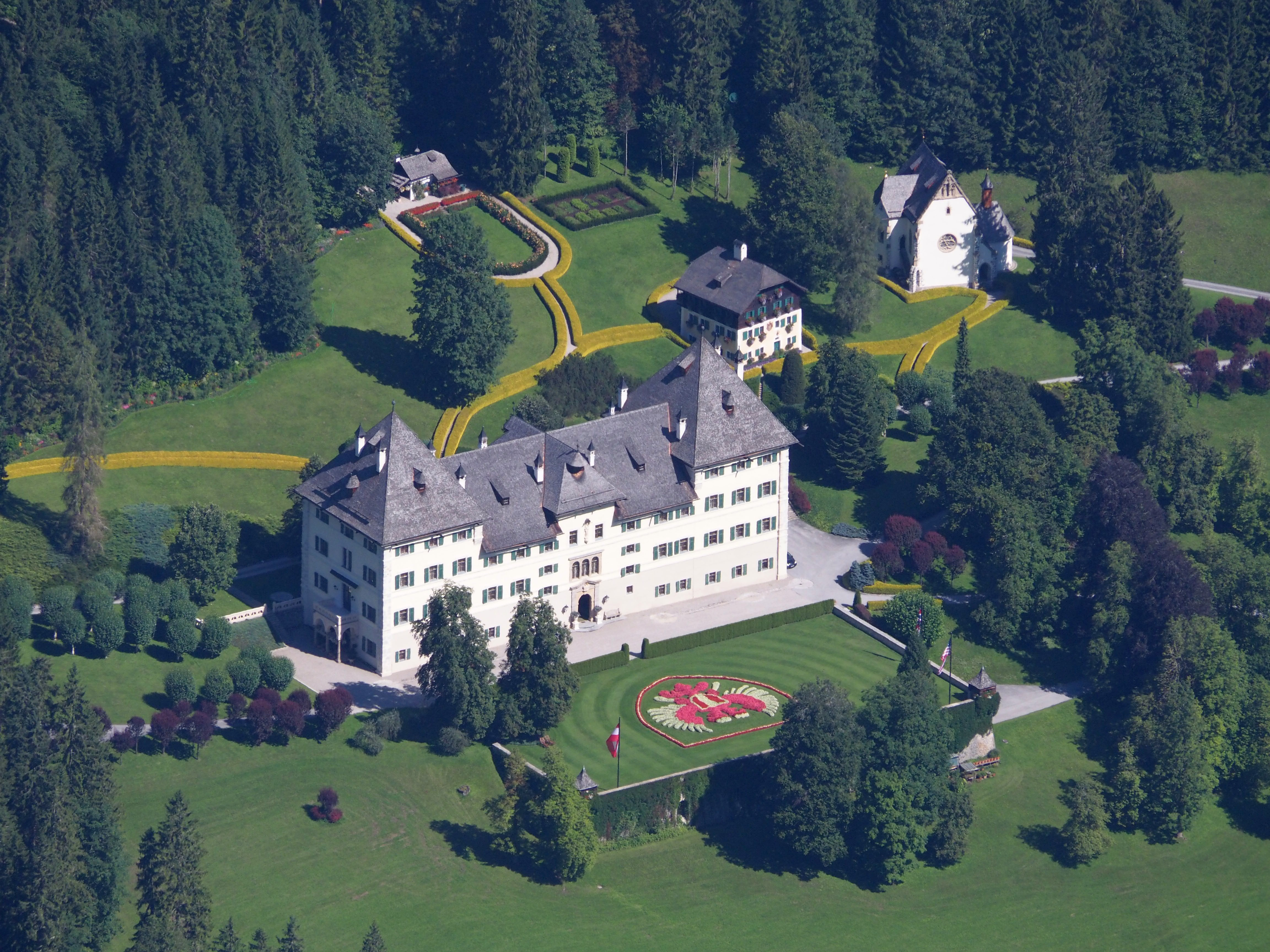
Schloss Blühnbach
