= Where Eagles Dare =

1968 epic action adventure war film by Brian G. Hutton

- UK quad crown release poster by Howard Terpning
- Directed by: Brian G. Hutton
- Screenplay by: Alistair MacLean
- Based on: Where Eagles Dare; 1967 novel by Alistair MacLean
- Produced by: Elliott Kastner
- Starring: Richard Burton; Clint Eastwood; Mary Ure; Patrick Wymark; Michael Hordern
- Cinematography: Arthur Ibbetson
- Edited by: John Jympson
- Music by: Ron Goodwin
- Color process: Metrocolor
- Production company: Winkast Film Productions
- Distributed by: Metro-Goldwyn-Mayer
- Release date: 4 December 1968
- Running time: 155 minutes
- Countries: United States; United Kingdom
- Language: English
- Budget: $6.2 million–$7.7 million
- Box office: $21 million

Where Eagles Dare is a 1968 epic action adventure war film directed by Brian G. Hutton and starring Richard Burton, Clint Eastwood and Mary Ure. It follows a World War II British Special Operations Executive team charged with saving a captured American general from a fortress known as Schloß Adler (Castle of the Eagles), as their mission takes several unexpected turns. It was filmed in Panavision using the Metrocolor process, and was distributed by Metro-Goldwyn-Mayer. Alistair MacLean wrote the screenplay, his first, while he was writing the novel of the same name. Both became commercial successes.

The film involved some of the top filmmakers of the day and was shot in Austria. Hollywood stuntman Yakima Canutt was the second unit director and shot most of the action scenes. British stuntman Alf Joint doubled for Burton in many sequences, including a fight on top of the cable car. award-winning conductor and composer Ron Goodwin wrote the film score, and future Oscar nominee Arthur Ibbetson worked on the cinematography.

Where Eagles Dare received mostly positive reviews, with praise for its action sequences, score, and the performances of Burton and Eastwood, and the film has since been considered a classic.

== Plot ==
During World War II, MI6 officers Colonel Turner and Admiral Rolland assemble a commando team to rescue American Brigadier General George Carnaby, a chief planner for the Western Front, who is a prisoner at Schloß Adler, an alpine mountaintop fortress in Bavaria, accessible only by cable car.

The team consists of Major John Smith, Sergeants Harrod and MacPherson, Captains Lee Thomas, Ted Berkeley, and Olaf Christiansen, and US Army Ranger Lieutenant Morris Schaffer. Disguised as German soldiers, they parachute into an area near the castle. Harrod is found dead with a broken neck, and Smith deduces that he was murdered. Smith secretly meets with his lover, British agent Mary Ellison, but keeps her involvement from his men. In a tavern in the nearby village, Smith meets undercover agent Heidi Schmidt, who has arranged for Mary to work inside the castle. Smith tells Mary that Carnaby is an imposter, US Corporal Cartwright Jones, and that the British staged his capture. Later, Smith discovers MacPherson dead.

When a German colonel arrives in the tavern with soldiers ostensibly searching for deserters, Smith realises that the colonel is really searching for his team and surrenders to avoid an unwinnable fight. Thomas, Berkeley, and Christiansen are taken to the castle, while Smith and Schaffer escape and infiltrate the castle via cable car. Inside, they reunite with Mary and observe General Rosemeyer and Colonel Kramer interrogate Carnaby. Thomas, Berkeley, and Christiansen arrive and are revealed to be German double agents.

Smith and Schaffer intrude on the men, with weapons drawn. However, Smith then forces Schaffer to surrender his weapon and identifies himself as Major Johann Schmidt of the Schutzstaffel's (SS) intelligence branch. He exposes Carnaby's identity and claims that Thomas, Berkeley, and Christiansen are MI6 agents impersonating German spies. Smith conveys proof of his identity by showing Kramer the name of Germany's top spy in Whitehall. Kramer silently affirms it, and challenges the double agents to prove themselves as German agents by providing the list of agents they set up across Britain.

With the list in his hand, Smith reveals the truth: believing that German spies have extensively infiltrated British intelligence, MI6 identified Thomas, Berkeley, and Christiansen as suspects and launched the mission, both to prove this and to obtain the identities of their agents and commander. Smith's ploy is interrupted by the arrival of SS Major von Hapen, who suspects everyone, but Smith causes a distraction which allows Schaffer to fatally shoot von Hapen, Kramer, and Rosemeyer. The team, including Mary and Carnaby, escape and take Thomas, Berkeley, and Christiansen as prisoners.

As alarms sound, Schaffer sets explosives around the castle while Smith radios Rolland for extraction. The group travels to the cable car station, sacrificing Thomas as a decoy. Berkeley and Christiansen attempt to escape on a cable car but are killed by Smith. The team escapes on the next cable car. Reunited with Heidi in the village, they battle their way onto an airfield in a bus and escape aboard a Ju 52 aircraft, with Turner waiting onboard.

Smith reveals that Kramer identified Turner as Germany's top spy in Britain, confirming Rolland's suspicions. Turner chose Smith to lead the mission, believing him to be a German double agent, but unaware that he was working undercover for Rolland. To ensure the mission's success, Smith secretly recruited Mary, his trusted ally, and Schaffer, who had no ties to the compromised MI6. To avoid a humiliating court-martial and execution, Turner is permitted to jump from the aircraft to his death. As the exhausted operatives fly home, Schaffer wryly suggests that Smith keep his next mission "all-British".

== Cast ==
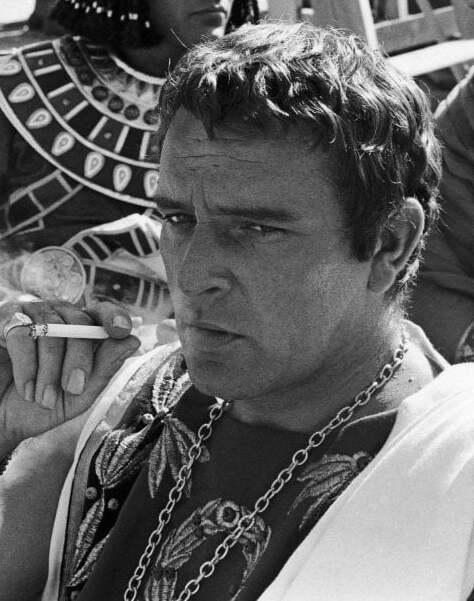
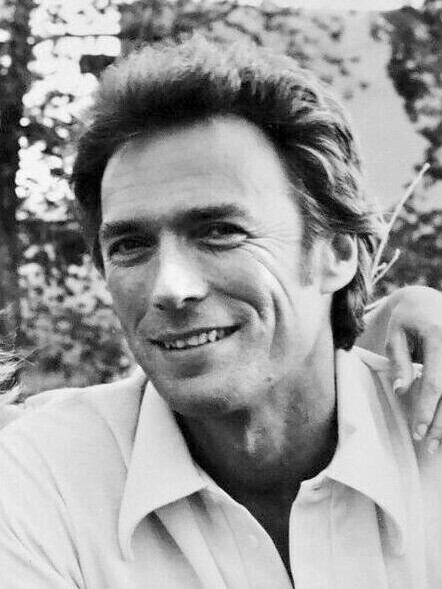
Richard Burton (pictured in 1961) and Clint Eastwood (1976)
- Richard Burton as Major John Smith
- Clint Eastwood as Lieutenant Morris Schaffer
- Mary Ure as Mary Ellison
- Patrick Wymark as Colonel Wyatt Turner
- Michael Hordern as Vice Admiral Rolland
- Donald Houston as Captain Olaf Christiansen
- Peter Barkworth as Captain Ted Berkeley
- William Squire as Captain Lee Thomas
- Robert Beatty as Brigadier General George Carnaby / Corporal Cartwright Jones
- Brook Williams as Sergeant Harrod
- Neil McCarthy as Sergeant Jock MacPherson
- Vincent Ball as Wing Commander Cecil Carpenter
- Anton Diffring as Colonel Paul Kramer
- Ferdy Mayne as General Julius Rosemeyer
- Derren Nesbitt as Major von Hapen
- Ingrid Pitt as Heidi Schmidt
- Victor Beaumont as Lieutenant Colonel Weissner

The cast of Where Eagles Dare also includes uncredited appearances by Philip Stone as cable car operator, Guy Deghy as Major Wilhelm Wilner, Derek Newark as SS Officer, and Olga Lowe as Anne-Marie Kernitser.

== Production ==
=== Development ===
Burton later said, "I decided to do the picture because Elizabeth (Taylor)'s two sons said they were fed up with me making films they weren't allowed to see, or in which I get killed. They wanted me to kill a few people instead."

Burton approached producer Elliott Kastner "and asked him if he had some super-hero stuff for me where I don't get killed in the end."

The producer consulted MacLean and requested an adventure film filled with mystery, suspense, and action. Most of MacLean's novels had been made into films or were being filmed. Kastner persuaded MacLean to write a new story; six weeks later, he delivered the script, at that time entitled Castle of Eagles. Kastner hated the title, and chose Where Eagles Dare instead. The title is from Act I, Scene III, Line 71 in William Shakespeare's play Richard III: "The world is grown so bad, that wrens make prey where eagles dare not perch". Like virtually all of MacLean's works, Where Eagles Dare features his trademark "secret traitor", who must be unmasked by the end.

Kastner and co-producer Jerry Gershwin announced in July 1966 that they had purchased five MacLean scripts, starting with Where Eagles Dare and When Eight Bells Toll. Brian Hutton had just made Sol Madrid for the producers and was signed to direct.

=== Filming ===
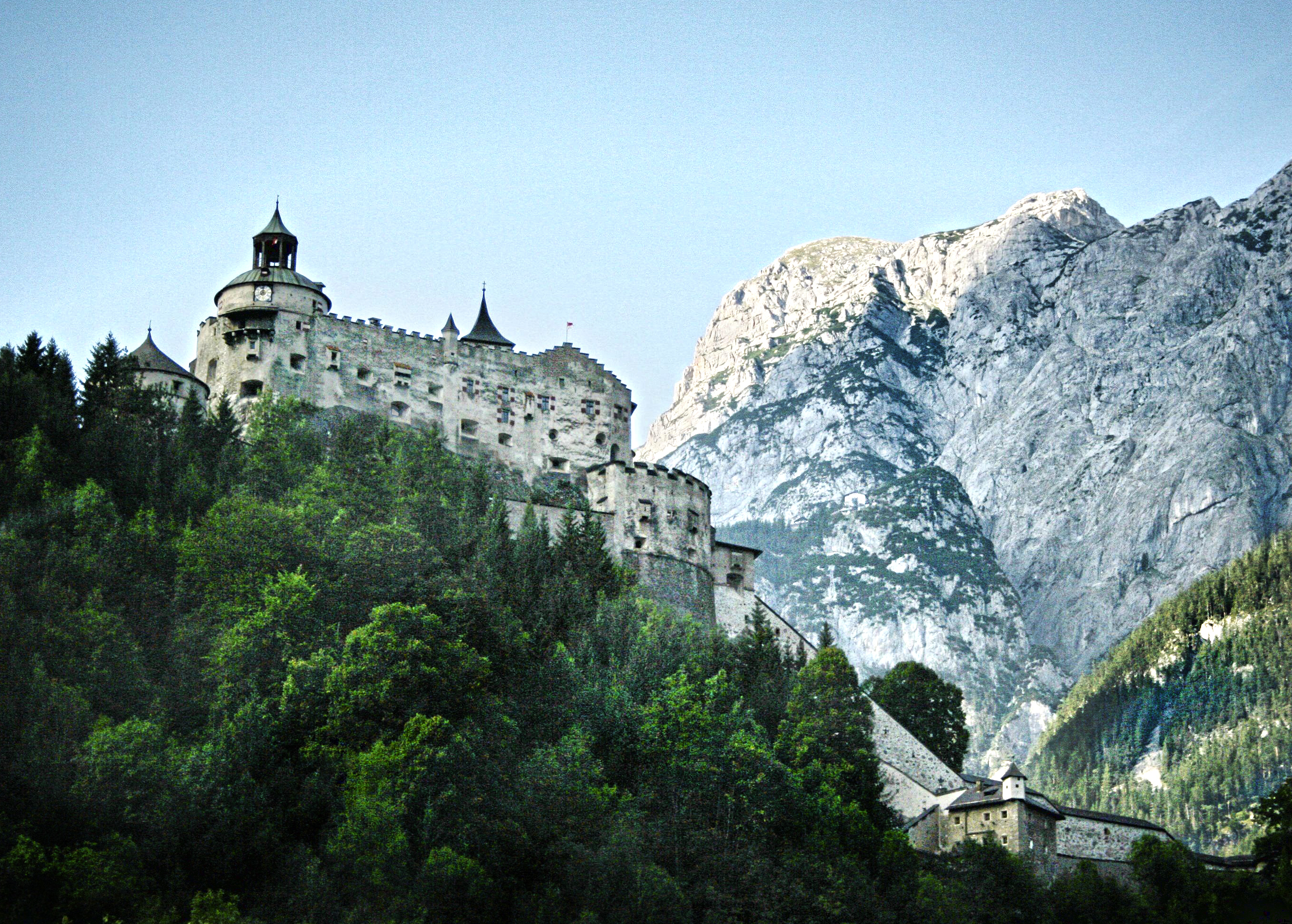
Festung Hohenwerfen, in Werfen, Austria, where the castle scenes were filmed

Eastwood and Burton reportedly dubbed the film 'Where Doubles Dare' due to the amount of screen time in which stand-ins doubled for the cast during action sequences. Filming began on 2 January 1968 in Austria and concluded in July 1968. Eastwood received a salary of $800,000 while Burton received $1,200,000. This is one of the first sound films to have used front projection effect. This technology enabled filming of the scenes where the actors are on top of the cable car.

Eastwood initially thought the script written by MacLean was "terrible" and was "all exposition and complications." According to Derren Nesbitt, Eastwood requested that he be given less dialogue. Most of Schaffer's lines were given to Burton, whilst Eastwood handled most of the action scenes. Director Hutton played to his actors' strengths, allowing for Burton's theatrical background to help the character of Smith and Eastwood's quiet demeanour to establish Schaffer. Eastwood took the part on the advice of his agent, who felt it would be interesting to see his client appear with someone with seniority. Eastwood and Burton got along well on set. Ingrid Pitt had spent part of her childhood in a concentration camp and reportedly found it uncomfortable to work on the movie.

Nesbitt was keen to be as authentic as possible with the character of the suspicious Major von Hapen. Whilst on location, he requested to meet a former member of the Gestapo to better understand how to play the character and to get the military regalia correct. While dressed in his SS uniform, he caused a Baron to faint with shock and found out that he was Himmler's driver. Nesbitt said that the "Jewish Chronicle called me afterwards and said, 'How could you play a German?' I said 'I do it because I play them very badly.' That seemed to satisfy them." He was injured while filming the scene in which von Hapen is killed. The blood squib attached to Nesbitt exploded with such force that he was temporarily blinded, though he made a quick recovery.

The filming was delayed by adverse weather in Austria. Shooting took place during the winter and early spring of 1968, and the crew had to contend with blizzards, sub-zero temperatures, and potential avalanches. Further delays were incurred when Richard Burton, well known for his drinking binges, disappeared for several days, with his friends Peter O'Toole, Oliver Reed, Trevor Howard, and Richard Harris. As part of his deal with Metro-Goldwyn-Mayer, Clint Eastwood took delivery of a Norton P11 motorcycle, which he 'tested' at Brands Hatch racetrack, accompanied by Ingrid Pitt, something that he had been forbidden from doing by Kastner for insurance purposes in case of injury or worse.

Stuntman Alf Joint was Richard Burton's stand-in and double, performing the famous cable car jump sequence (during which he lost three teeth). Joint had previously played Capungo, the man whom James Bond electrocuted in a bathtub in Goldfinger. He stated that at one point during production, Burton was so drunk that he knocked himself out while filming and that Joint had to quickly fill in for him. Nesbitt observed that Burton was drinking as many as four bottles of vodka per day.

Visitors to the set included Burton's wife, Elizabeth Taylor and actor Robert Shaw, who was then married to Mary Ure.

At one point during filming, Burton was threatened at gunpoint by an overzealous fan.

The Junkers Ju 52 used to fly Smith and Schaffer's team into Austria and then make their escape at the end of the film was a Swiss Air Force Ju 52/3m, registration A-702. It was destroyed in an accident on 4 August 2018 in Switzerland, killing all 20 people on board.

- The castle setting was Hohenwerfen Castle, Werfen, Austria; filmed in January 1968.
- Filming of the cable car and lower cable car station took place in January 1968 at the Feuerkogel Seilbahn at Ebensee, Austria, and the close-ups were done on a soundstage. Scenes featuring the castle and the cable car together were filmed using a scale model.
- Airport scenes were filmed at the Flugplatz at Aigen im Ennstal, Austria; filmed in early 1968. The exact place of filming is the "Fiala-Fernbrugg" garrison, still used by HS Geschwader 2 and FlAR2/3rd Bat. of the Austrian Army. The big rocky mountain in the background of the airfield is the Grimming, about 40 kilometres (25 mi) east of the "Hoher Dachstein", or about 80 kilometres (50 mi) east and 10 kilometres (6.2 mi) south of Werfen.
- The village setting was Lofer, Austria; filmed in January 1968.
- Other scenes were shot at MGM-British Studios, Borehamwood, England; filmed in spring 1968.

Arthur Ibbetson photographed the film on 35mm film using Panavision anamorphic lenses. At Technicolor’s London facility, the 35mm anamorphic negative was optically enlarged using Panavision’s Micro Panatar conversion lens to create a 65mm interpositive, from which a 65mm negative was made. That enlarged 65mm negative was then used to produce the film’s 70mm release prints.

== Release ==
Where Eagles Dare received a Royal premiere at the Empire Leicester Square Cinema on 22 January 1969 with Princess Alexandra in attendance. Of the stars of the film, only Clint Eastwood was not present, as he was filming Two Mules for Sister Sara in Mexico.

== Reception ==
Where Eagles Dare was a huge success, earning $6,560,000 at the North American box office during its first year of release. It was the seventh-most popular film at the UK box office in 1969, and 13th in the US.

Though many critics found the plot confusing, reviews were generally positive. Vincent Canby of the New York Times praised the action scenes and cinematography. Variety said the film was 'highly entertaining, thrilling and rarely lets down for a moment… more of a saga of cool, calculated courage, than any glorification of war.'. The film was particularly lucrative for Richard Burton, who earned a considerable sum in royalties through television repeats and video sales. Where Eagles Dare had its first showing on British television on 26 December 1979 on BBC1.

Mad Magazine spoofed the film in October 1969 under the title "Where Vultures Fare." In 2009 Cinema Retro released a special issue dedicated to Where Eagles Dare which detailed the production and filming of the film.

Years after its debut, Where Eagles Dare is considered a classic and one of the best war films of all time. Burton and Eastwood's performances, and the various action scenes are generally praised. Director Steven Spielberg called it his favourite war film. Empire film critic Ian Nathan gave the film three out of five stars, calling it "a fine example of that war movie staple" and a "Classic War caper with a few too many plot contrivances but high on adventure". The Movie Scene said "Where Eagles Dare is by no means a great movie but it achieves what it sets out to do and that is to deliver action, adventure and excitement in a Boy's Own kind of way."

On Rotten Tomatoes, it has an 84% rating with a mean of 6.9 out of 10 based on 25 reviews.

== Home media ==
Where Eagles Dare was released on Blu-ray in 2010.

== Soundtrack ==
Where Eagles Dare

Soundtrack album by Ron Goodwin
- Released: 4 January 2005
- Genres: Soundtracks; Film music
- Length: 74:07
- Label: Film Score Monthly
- Producer: Lukas Kendall

The score was composed by Ron Goodwin. A soundtrack was released on Compact Disc in 2005 by Film Score Monthly, of the Silver Age Classics series, in association with Turner Entertainment. It was a two-disc release, the first CD being the film music, the second the film music for Operation Crossbow and source music for Where Eagles Dare. The release has been limited to 3,000 pressings. The soundtrack has received critical acclaim.

Disc one
No.	Title	Length
1.	"Main Title"
2.	"Before Jump/Death of Harrod"
3.	"Mary and Smith Meet/Sting on Castle/Parade Ground"
4.	"Preparation in Luggage Office/Fight in Car"
5.	"The Booby Trap"
6.	"Ascent on the Cable Car"
7.	"Death of Radio Engineer and Helicopter Pilot"
8.	"Checking on Smith/Names in Notebook"
9.	"Smith Triumphs Over Nazis"
10.	"Intermission Playout"
11.	"Entr'Acte"
12.	"Encounter in the Castle"
13.	"Journey Through the Castle Part 1"
14.	"Journey Through the Castle Part 2"
15.	"Descent and Fight on the Cable Car"
16.	"Escape from the Cable Car"
17.	"Chase, Part 1 and 2"
18.	"The Chase in the Airfield"
19.	"The Real Traitor"
20.	"End Playout"

== Novel ==
The principal difference is that the 1966 novel by Alistair MacLean is less violent. A scene during their escape, in which Smith saves a German guard from burning to death, presaged the non-lethal thriller vein that MacLean would explore in his later career. In the novel the characters are more clearly defined and slightly more humorous than their depictions in the film, which is fast-paced and has sombre performances from Burton and Eastwood at its centre. Three characters are differently named in the novel: Ted Berkeley is called Edward Carraciola, Jock MacPherson is called Torrance-Smythe, and Major von Hapen is instead Captain von Brauchitsch. The love stories between Schaffer and Heidi and between Smith and Mary were cut. In the novel, Smith asks London to arrange for a priest to meet them at the airport.

In the film the group is flown into Germany in a Luftwaffe Junkers Ju 52, but in the book it is an RAF Avro Lancaster. In the film Kramer, Rosemeyer, and von Hapen are shot dead by Schaffer, but in the novel they are given high doses of nembutal. In the film the female German officer is shot, but in the novel she is overpowered by Mary.

In the film Christiansen is killed and Berkeley (Carraciola in the novel) incapacitated by Smith on the cable car (the latter dies when the cable car explodes), and Thomas is shot and killed by a German while climbing down a rope. In the book the three attempt to escape in the cable car with Smith on the roof; Carraciola is crushed by the suspension arm of the cable car while struggling with Smith on the roof, and Thomas and Christiansen fall to their deaths after Smith blows the cable car up with plastic explosive.

== Bibliography ==
- Hughes, Howard (2009). Aim for the Heart. London: I.B. Tauris. ISBN 978-1-84511-902-7.
- Munn, Michael (1992). Clint Eastwood: Hollywood's Loner. London: Robson Books. ISBN 0-86051-790-X.
- Dyer, Geoff (2018). Broadsword Calling Danny Boy. London: Penguin Books. ISBN 978-0141987620.
