= Puppet on a Chain (film) =

1970 British film based on the 1969 novel

- Film poster by Arnaldo Putzu
- Directed by: Geoffrey Reeve; Don Sharp (boat sequence)
- Written by: Alistair MacLean; Paul Wheeler (additional material); Don Sharp (additional material)
- Based on: the novel Puppet on a Chain by Alistair MacLean
- Produced by: Kurt Unger
- Starring: Sven-Bertil Taube, Barbara Parkins, Alexander Knox
- Cinematography: Jack Hildyard
- Edited by: Bill Lenny
- Music by: Piero Piccioni
- Production company: Big City Productions
- Distributed by: Scotia-Barber
- Release date: 2 August 1970 (London)
- Running time: 98 minutes (theatrical release)
- Countries: England, Netherlands
- Language: English

Puppet on a Chain is a 1970 British thriller film directed by Geoffrey Reeve and starring Sven-Bertil Taube, Barbara Parkins and Alexander Knox. It is based on the 1969 novel Puppet on a Chain by Alistair MacLean.

The story was Maclean's 14th and the seventh film adaption of a Maclean novel. The film's signature boat chase (8 minutes of screen time) along the canals of Amsterdam reportedly inspired the boat chase in the James Bond movie Live and Let Die two years later and in the 1988 thriller Amsterdamned, which would also feature a long canal boat chase. The boat chase was directed by Don Sharp, who also did various reshoots for the film.

== Plot ==
After three hippie drug-dealers are murdered by "the assassin" in a house in Los Angeles, the U.S. government sends special agent Paul Sherman to track down the Dutch source of heroin that is causing the drug war. On arriving at Amsterdam Schiphol Airport, Sherman witnesses an agent, Jimmy Duclos, who was there to meet him, shot dead by the assassin.

Sherman is originally from the Netherlands, but it is clear that Amsterdam's chief of police, Colonel De Graaf, is unhappy with having the Americans interfere in Dutch affairs. However, Sherman's direct contact, Inspector Van Gelder, is more cooperative, since his niece, Trudi, suffers from severe brain damage caused by a heroin overdose eight years earlier.

Sherman makes contact with a deep-cover agent from Washington named Maggie. Sherman is then followed around Amsterdam by the assassin, indicating that the drug dealers have someone on the inside. Sherman gets away from him and later confronts him in Sherman's hotel room, where Sherman accidentally kills him.

Sherman meets Duclos' girlfriend Astrid Lemay and her drug-addicted brother George. Soon after, George dies of an overdose and she is murdered. Sherman is attacked by a man on a boat and shoots him dead. Drug lord Meegeren, who had killed Astrid, then kills Maggie by hanging her from a chain (although in the book she is pitchforked to death by the Dutch women in the courtyard) and holds Sherman prisoner. Meegeren leaves on a speedboat. Sherman escapes and follows him on another speedboat. The chase ends with Meegeren accidentally crashing his boat and it being destroyed by fire.

Sherman and a colleague arrive at a warehouse (run by Morgenstern but without his partner Mugenthaler who only appears in the book) where the drugs are being distributed. There he meets Van Gelder and his niece. He finds out that they are part of the trafficking gang and that Trudi had been faking her mental disability. A shootout leaves Trudi dead and Sherman wounded. Van Gelder tries to escape, but is killed by Sherman (again a discrepancy in that he falls to his death in the film but is skewered on a hook in the book).

== Cast ==
- Sven-Bertil Taube as Paul Sherman
- Barbara Parkins as Maggie
- Alexander Knox as Col. De Graaf
- Patrick Allen as Insp. Van Gelder
- Vladek Sheybal as Meegeren
- Ania Marson as Astrid Lemay
- Stewart F. Lane as George Lemay
- Drewe Henley as Jimmy Duclos
- Michael Mellinger as Hotel Manager
- Penny Casdagli as Trudi
- Peter Hutchins as The Assassin
- Henny Orri as Herta
- Mark Malicz as Morgenstern
- Peter Brace as Thug
- Gerry Crampton as Thug
- Arnold Diamond as Coroner
- Joe Dunne as Barge-hold henchman
- Leon Eagles as Police Sgt at Station
- George Leech as Thug
- Fred Machon as Hotel Guest
- John More as Hotel Guest
- Paddy Smith as Bellboy
- Willem Sibbelee
- Jacques Luijer

== Production ==
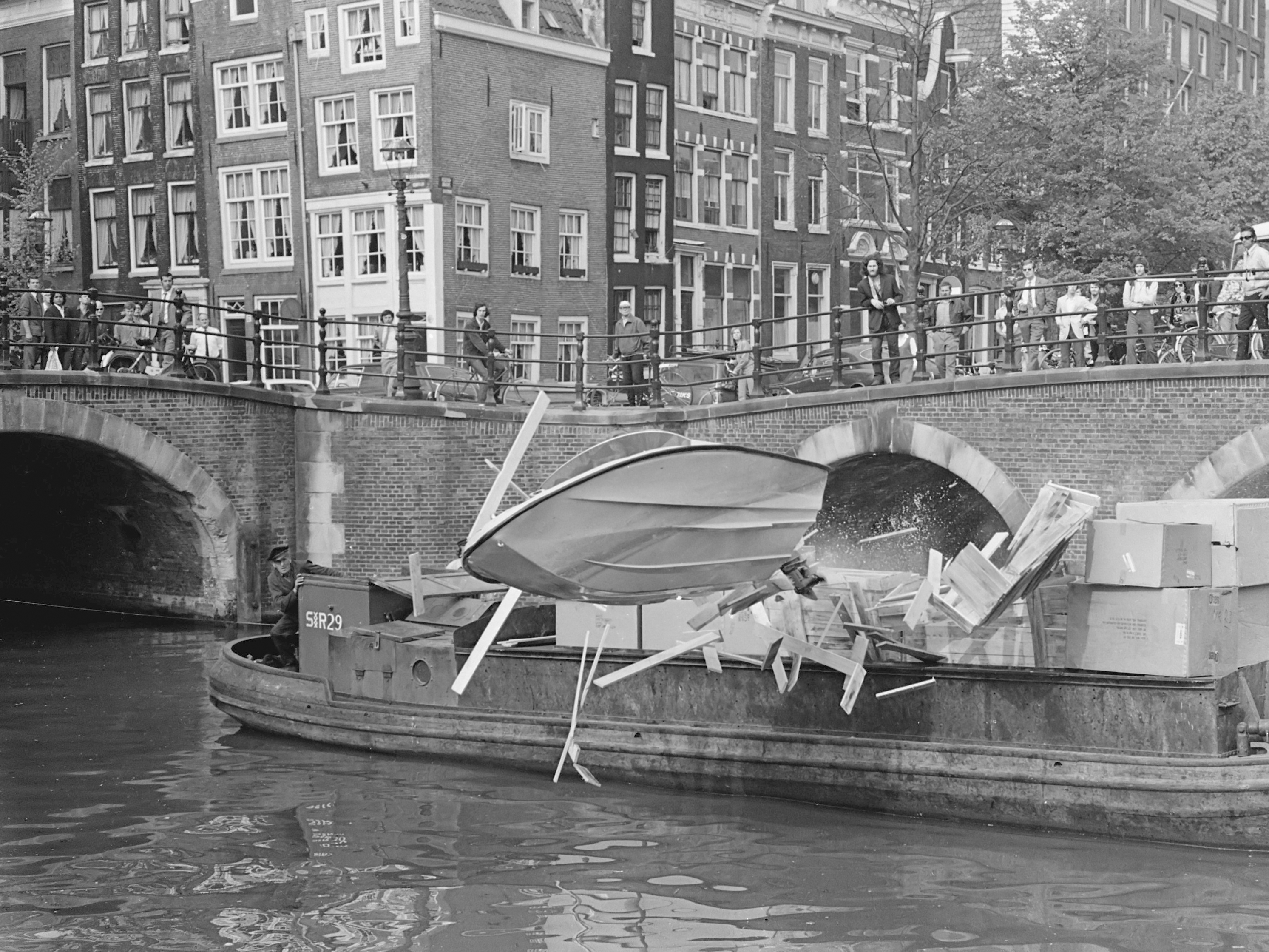
Shooting of a pivotal stunt (1970)

Alistair MacLean had formed a partnership with Geoffrey Reeve to make movies where MacLean would write and Reeves would direct. Reeves had been part of the development of Puppet on a Chain. The film was financed by the Big City company of Israel film producer Kurt Unger. MacLean wrote the script but Unger was unhappy and had it rewritten by Paul Wheeler which upset MacLean. Wheeler says he wrote the script for £2000.

The film was shot on location in the Netherlands and at Shepperton Studios.

The famous boat chase sequence was performed by Wim Wagenaar and directed by Don Sharp who was specifically hired to do it over a four-week period. Once he completed that sequence he was hired by the producers to reshoot additional sequences, using a moviola of the original cut on set to enable footage to match. Sharp says the plot was adjusted, the ending changed, among many other adjustments. Sharp:

The chappie who directed originally [Geoffrey Reeve, who died in 2010] has gone on to produce some nice movies, and before this he had a good career in shooting commercials. And he’s a talented man. But he didn’t have a story sense then, as a director, and he and his camera operator, each set-up, you know, a sequence that looked like part of a television commercial and wasn’t there for the drama of it, or just to let the audience know what was happening. And therefore I had to take parts out of, for example, a nightclub sequence. Seventy-five per cent of it was fine; only when it came to the dialogue bits between them did I have to go in and reshoot it, because it just didn’t make sense – to shoot a couple of really good, important dialogue lines to do with the plot in a shot between the legs of a dancer . . . That wasn’t exactly it but I mean that sort of thing, you know. It was done for a visual effect.

== Reception ==
Sharp said the film went on to make "a mint of money" and claimed in 2007 he was still getting royalties from it being shown on television.

The Monthly Film Bulletin called it a "singularly unappetising piece of work."
