= Breakheart =

Breakheart may refer to:

- Breakheart Pass (novel), written by Alistair MacLean
- Breakheart Pass (film), 1975 film starring Charles Bronson and Ben Johnson
- Breakheart Reservation, a Massachusetts state park
