= Fear Is the Key =

Fear Is the Key may refer to:

- Fear Is the Key (novel), a 1961 thriller novel by Alistair MacLean
  - Fear Is the Key (film), a 1972 British action thriller film, based on the 1961 novel
- "Fear Is the Key", a song by Iron Maiden, from the album Fear of the Dark
