= Athabasca (novel) =

1980 novel by Alistair MacLean

- First edition (UK)
- Author: Alistair MacLean
- Language: English
- Genre: Thriller Novel
- Publisher: Collins (UK); Doubleday (US)
- Publication date: 1980
- Publication place: United Kingdom
- Media type: Print
- Pages: 284 pp.
- ISBN: 0-449-24429-6
- OCLC: 8332476
- Preceded by: Goodbye California
- Followed by: River of Death

Athabasca is a novel by Scottish author Alistair MacLean, first published in 1980. As with the novel Night Without End, it depicts adventure, sabotage and murder in the unforgiving Arctic environment. It is set in the oilfields and oil sands fields of Alaska and Canada and includes a considerable amount of technical detail on the operations.

== Plot introduction ==
When the operations manager of an oil company operating in Prudhoe Bay in Alaska receives a mysterious anonymous threat of sabotage, his superiors call in Jim Brady Enterprises, a firm of oilfield specialists. Dermott and Mackenzie, tough ex-field managers and now anti-sabotage specialists, arrive, but initial investigations get them nowhere. Then the operations manager is murdered and one of the pump stations in the Trans-Alaska Pipeline is damaged, with further loss of life.

Jim Brady himself arrives to direct operations, to no avail. Then the company's operations at the Athabasca Oil Sands in Canada are disrupted and Dermott is nearly killed.

Despite assistance from the RCMP and the FBI, suspicions fall on many employees, though nothing can be proved. As bodies and equipment damage mount up, Brady and his two investigators play a hunch and finally expose the men they believe to be responsible. But even they are not the main instigators of the events, as the final chapter of the novel reveals.

== Background ==
Producer Peter Snell, who made Bear Island, was the one who suggested MacLean set a novel in the area near Lake Athabasca.

== Reception ==
The Los Angeles Times called it "sterile, ponderous, preposterous, ungrammatical, repetitious, ridden with cliches and devoid of suspense. Banal, bromidic and bewildered."

The New York Times said "aside from the old master's handling of the mise en scene he is not at his best here" arguing the lead characters "are sketchily and unappealingly drawn, and the people they deal with are cardboard cutouts" although it liked the ending "So we wind up in fine style, but only after a plodding start."

The book became a best seller.
