= Java Head (disambiguation) =

Java Head or Tanjung Layar, is a prominent cape at the extreme western end of Java.

Java Head may also refer to:

- Java Head (novel), a 1919 novel by Joseph Hergesheimer
- Java Head (1923 film), an American adaptation
- Java Head (1934 film), a British adaptation

== See also ==
- South by Java Head, a 1958 novel by Alistair MacLean
