= Force 10 from Navarone (novel) =

1968 novel by Alistair MacLean

- First edition cover (UK)
- Author: Alistair MacLean
- Language: English
- Genre: War novel
- Publisher: Collins (UK); Doubleday (US)
- Publication date: 1968
- Publication place: United Kingdom
- Media type: Print (hardcover)
- Pages: 254
- Preceded by: Where Eagles Dare
- Followed by: Puppet on a Chain

Force 10 from Navarone is a World War II novel by Scottish author Alistair MacLean. It serves as a sequel to MacLean's 1957 The Guns of Navarone, but follows the events of the 1961 film adaptation of the same name. It features various characters from the film who were not in the book, and leaves out some major characters from the book.

== Introduction ==
Force 10 From Navarone begins immediately after the events portrayed in The Guns of Navarone, with Mallory and Miller assigned on a new mission code-named "Force 10". Mallory and Miller return to Navarone to recruit their comrade Stavros (who stayed behind in the film, but not in the book).

They are joined by three young British Royal Marine Commandos, and are parachuted into Nazi-occupied, frozen, war-torn Yugoslavia. There they attempt to aid the Yugoslav Partisans in their battle against the Nazi German occupiers and their Chetnik collaborators. As with all MacLean novels, the true mission is secret. Everyone, including the Marine Commandos, is misled. The real mission (known only to Mallory, Miller, Andrea and a Partisan General) is to rescue captured British agents.

As usual with MacLean, not all things are quite what they seem, and like The Guns of Navarone one of the missions is to try to save a significant number of partisans from a certain death in a German offensive. In the melee of double-crosses and triple-crosses, things do not go as planned, and distrust is rife among allies and enemies alike.

== Story ==
Mallory and Miller are aboard the Royal Navy destroyer HMS Sirdar, on its way to the island of Kheros. Captain Jensen, the Chief of Allied Intelligence in the Mediterranean, orders them to collect Andrea Stavros from his wedding to a resistance fighter, Maria. After persuading Andrea, the three board a Wellington Bomber to take them to Termoli in Italy, where Captain Jensen awaits them. Jensen congratulates Mallory's team and introduces them to a "back-up team" of three Royal Marine sergeants – Reynolds, Groves and Saunders. They're to go to the Neretva area of Bosnia to discover why, in recent weeks, every Allied agent parachuted into that area has been captured. Jensen introduces Mallory to a Partisan General Vukalovic who commands the Partisans in the Neretva valley, who are trapped in the so-called Zenica Cage. The next day they parachute in and meet up with what they believe to be a group of Partisans led by Captain Droshny. At the camp, they are shocked to be greeted by a German Army Captain Neufeld, who explains that Droshny's men are not Partisans but Chetniks (German collaborators). Captured, Mallory says they are deserters, and when Neufeld's men discover the crashed plane, from which Mallory deliberately jettisoned the spare fuel, it seems to support his claim that they had run out of fuel.

Amongst the Chetniks is a female guerrilla fighter named Maria, who accompanies her blind and mute brother Petar, as he wanders the area playing his guitar. People see Petar as "cursed" and will turn him away from their door. Meanwhile, General Vukalovic, who was parachuted into the Zenica Cage by a different plane, meets his various commanders one by one. The General meets Major Stefan, who explains to the General that the Germans have moved units of their 11th Army Corps to attack through the gap. Neufeld contacts General Zimmerman and sends Mallory's team to a nearby Partisan encampment to acquire information. The Chetniks escort Mallory's team through the towering forests in an ancient truck to near Partisan territory. Mallory instructs Andrea and Miller to kill two Chetniks who have been trying to follow them. Droshny is also following the two Chetniks. Arriving at the Partisan camp, Mallory meets Major Broznik and both go to the HQ hut, the rest to a communal rest hut. Saunders goes to another hut to send a radio message for Mallory. Reynolds suspects Mallory of betrayal. A short while later, they discover Saunders murdered and his radio smashed. While Mallory, Andrea and Miller are sure it was Droshny, Reynolds believes the murderer to be Mallory.

Mallory continues their mission while keeping the two remaining disgruntled Marines in check. Mallory's team travel back to the Chetnik camp, before taking Neufeld and Droshny as hostages when they rescue the captured British spies. After releasing the British agents from a remote concrete block-house, Mallory's team leave Neufeld, Droshny and the guards imprisoned there. Neufeld and Droshny escape just in time to witness Mallory's team boarding an Allied bomber to fly off to Italy. Mallory and company have not left, but five Partisans and the agents have. While returning to the Neretva valley, Mallory, with the help of Reynolds, realises that he must now rescue Maria and Petar from Droshny. Neufeld contacts Zimmerman by radio and tells him that Mallory said the Partisans expect the attack to come from across the Western Gap. Zimmerman orders his two armoured divisions around the bridge for their attack in a few hours' time. Having returned to the block-house, Neufeld and Droshny are astonished to be confronted by Mallory, Miller and Andrea while interrogating Maria. Freeing Maria and her brother, Mallory returns to Neufeld's camp and destroys his radio. After a ride on a railway engine, the group descends into the Neretva gorge, near the dam.

== Characters ==
- Captain Keith Mallory – the main protagonist returns a little wiser and a little bit more cynical. He is a New Zealand officer with the Long Range Desert Group (LRDG). Mallory was a pre-war mountain climber, nicknamed "The Human Fly".
- Colonel Andrea Stavros – the newly married Stavros has to be dragged off Navarone on this mission, although he still annoys Miller.
- Corporal Donovan "Dusty" Miller – still as cynical as ever, but has more faith in his companions now.
- Captain James Jensen R.N. – the head of Intelligence for the Mediterranean Theatre.
- Royal Marine Sergeants Doug Reynolds, Groves and Saunders – described as exact replacements for Mallory, Miller and Andrea by Jensen, they were selected just in case the Mallory's team failed to return from Navarone.
- Captain Droshny – gigantic leader of a band of Chetniks, described as the best knife fighter in the Balkans.
- Maria – a ferocious female Chetnik fighter.
- Petar – Maria' blind/mute brother and a sort of wandering minstrel of the Balkans, but also secretly head of intelligence for the Balkans.
- Hauptmann Neufeld – German 11th Army Corps and responsible for capturing the Allied spies.
- General Vukalovic – the Yugoslav Partisan leader, he commands the Zenica Cage that is now surrounded by the Germans and one of the few that knows Mallory's team's real mission.
- Colonel Janzy, Colonel Lazlo and Major Stefan – Vukalovic's lieutenants. Janzy commands the area around the Neretva dam and Zenica Gap, Colonel Lazlo commands the area at the Neretva bridge, and Major Stefan commands the area around the Western Gap.

== Reception ==
Force 10 From Navarone was commercially very successful, spending five months on the New York Times Bestseller List and being chosen as a Literary Guild Alternate Selection.

The New York Times called it "a mechanical shoot-em-up... the swift action, at which Mr Maclean is very good, is overgrown with historic Hollywood dodges".

== Film adaptation ==
In April 1967 Carl Foreman announced he would make After Navarone with Anthony Quinn, Gregory Peck and David Niven reprising their roles and J Lee Thompson returning as director.

The novel was adapted into the 1978 film Force 10 from Navarone, after years of delays by the film studio, directed by Guy Hamilton and starring Robert Shaw, Harrison Ford, Barbara Bach, Edward Fox and Franco Nero. The book and the film shared little other than title, the locations and the characters Mallory, Miller and Jensen. MacLean used elements of the movie plot as the basis for his 1982 novel Partisans.

== Sequels ==
Author Sam Llewellyn wrote two authorised sequels during the 1990s, Storm Force from Navarone and Thunderbolt from Navarone. These both featured Maclean's three heroes Mallory, Miller and Andrea along with Commander Jensen, R.N.

== See also ==
- Battle of Neretva
- Operation Harling
- Patrick Leigh Fermor
- List of anti-Partisan operations in Yugoslavia
