= Caravan to Vaccarès (film) =

1974 British-French film by Geoffrey Reeve

- Original cinema poster
- Directed by: Geoffrey Reeve
- Written by: Paul Wheeler; Joseph Forest
- Based on: novel by Alistair MacLean
- Produced by: Geoffrey Reeve; Richard Morris-Adams associate George Davis
- Starring: David Birney; Charlotte Rampling; Michael Lonsdale
- Cinematography: Fred Tammes
- Edited by: Robert Morgan
- Music by: Stanley Myers
- Production companies: Geoffrey Reeve Productions; Societe Nouvelle Prodis
- Distributed by: Fox-Rank Distributors (UK); Bryanston Film Distributors (USA)
- Release date: 8 August 1974
- Running time: 98 minutes (theatrical release)
- Countries: United Kingdom; France
- Language: English

Caravan to Vaccarès is a 1974 British-French action film directed by Geoffrey Reeve and starring David Birney, Charlotte Rampling and Michael Lonsdale. It was loosely based on the 1970 novel Caravan to Vaccarès by Alistair MacLean.

== Plot ==
In Southern France, a mysterious assassin shoots one man, then another.

A wandering young American adventurer, Bowman (David Birney), meets a pretty young British photographer, Lila (Charlotte Rampling) when she hitches a ride. They run into the assassin while helping a couple who have broken down by the side of the road.

When they arrive in town they meet a French duke (Michel Lonsdale) who invites them to dinner. David reveals that the duke had met him in Paris and offered him a job for $3,000 and a return ticket to New York but he doesn't know what for. He is driving a car lent by the duke. That night a man breaks into a place where they are staying but Bowman fights him off.

The duke appears and hires Bowman to smuggle a Hungarian scientist (Michael Bryant) out of France to the United States. Bowman is reluctant but the duke says if he won't do it he will report the car as being stolen.

The scientist escaped the Iron Curtain by hiding with a caravan of gypsies, but is being pursued by an unscrupulous gang bent on capturing him for sale to the highest bidder.

A woman who helps Bowman is murdered at a bull fight. She turns out to be the Duc's daughter.

Lila and the scientist are kidnapped, but Bowman rescues them. Lila and Bowman sleep together.

Bowman is driving the scientist to safety in a car when a helicopter chases after them. The helicopter drives the car off the road. It seems the scientist has fallen into quicksand; a rope is dropped from the helicopter to retrieve him. However it turns out the man is Bowman in disguise. He overpowers one of the men in the helicopter then is dropped into a bull ring. Bowman defeats a bull fighter and is about to be killed by a charging bull but is rescued when the Duc shoots it dead.

The Duc farewells Bowman and Lila at the airport with the scientist.

== Cast ==
- David Birney as Bowman
- Charlotte Rampling as Lila
- Michael Lonsdale as Duc de Croyter
- Marcel Bozzuffi as Czerda
- Michael Bryant as Zuger
- Serge Marquand as Ferenc
- Marianne Eggerickx as Cecile
- Françoise Brion as Stella
- Vania Vilers as Vania
- Manitas De Plata as Ricardo
- Jean-Pierre Cargol as Jules
- Jean-Pierre Castaldi as Pierre
- Jean Michaux as Waiter
- Alan Scott as Receptionist
- Jean-Yves Gautier as Gendarme
- Graham Hill as Helicopter pilot

== Production ==
The story was originally written as a screenplay developed by MacLean with Geoffrey Reeve before being turned into a novel.

Reeve had previously directed another story of Maclean's, Puppet on a Chain. That had been adapted by Paul Wheeler wrote the script for Vaccares for £2,000.

The film was shot on location in the Camargue in late 1973. The finale, where David Birney is dropped into a bull ring from a helicopter, was filmed last.

The Rank Organisation financed four films by the end of the 1974 financial year,Carry on Dick, Carry on Girls, The Belstone Fox and Don't Just Lie There, Say Something, and partly financed Soft Beds and Hard Battles and Caravan to Vaccares.

== Reception ==
The film had a royal premiere at the Odeon in Leicester Square honour of the Save the Children Fund. It was attended by Princess Anne and her then-husband Mark Phillips, but not MacLean who refused to attend.

=== Critique ===
The Guardian praised Rampling's beauty but said Birney "is about as expressive as a constipated owl" and that the film had "rather plastic romance and enough cinematic action to fill half a bucket with stuntmen's sweat."

"I guarantee there isn't an incident in this film you haven't seen before" wrote the Evening Standard.

Filmink claimed the film had "the most perfect Maclean heroine (Charlotte Rampling, who is beautiful, brave, feisty, exotic and mysterious) and the most miscast Maclean hero (David Birney, who plays a tough, sexy adventurer like a sitcom TV cop.)."
