= Goodbye California =

1978 novel by Alistair MacLean

- First edition cover (UK)
- Author: Alistair MacLean
- Language: English
- Genre: Thriller novel
- Publisher: Collins (UK); Doubleday (US)
- Publication date: 1978
- Publication place: United Kingdom
- Media type: Print
- Pages: 315
- ISBN: 0-449-23834-2
- Preceded by: Seawitch
- Followed by: Athabasca

Goodbye California is a novel by Scottish author Alistair MacLean, first published in 1977.

== Plot introduction ==
Set in the United States, an Islamic terrorist kidnaps nuclear scientists and steals radioactive material from a California nuclear power plant. When Detective Sergeant Ryder's wife is kidnapped along with nuclear scientists from the California power station where they all work, he sets out to find her. Facing resistance from within his own police department, he leaves his job and begins taking the law into his own hands. His son Jeff, a highway patrolman, and a few other trusted friends attempt to stop the terrorists from detonating home-built atomic bombs along California's fault lines, which would unleash massive earthquakes killing millions of people and destroying California's major cities.

== Background ==
The inspiration for the plot appears to be acknowledged by Maclean himself in his preface to the 1977 edition of the book where he describes his first experience of an earthquake while in California on 9 February 1971.

Maclean said in a 1975 interview he was working on a book where half of California fell into the ocean. "It's called for 1982 when all the planets are in alignment," he said. "There are people who believe it. The more I get into it the more I believe it myself."

== Reception ==
The book became a best seller in 1978.

== Proposed film adaptation ==
Director Don Sharp and producer Peter Snell, who had collaborated on the film Bear Island, based on another MacLean novel, tried to make a film version of Goodbye California, starring Charlton Heston, for Time Life. Just before filming was to begin, however, Time Life sold its film division and the film did not go ahead.
