= Floodgate (disambiguation) =

A floodgate is an adjustable gate used to control water flow.

It may also refer to:

- Floodgate, a novel by Alistair MacLean
- Floodgate Fund, a venture capital firm
- Flood control projects controversy in the Philippines, a political scandal in the Philippines sometimes known as "Floodgate"
