= Santorini (novel) =

1986 novel by Alistair MacLean

- First edition (UK)
- Author: Alistair MacLean
- Language: English
- Genre: Thriller
- Publisher: Collins (UK); Doubleday (US)
- Publication date: 1986
- Publication place: United Kingdom
- Media type: Print
- Pages: 224 pp.
- ISBN: 0-00-617453-1
- OCLC: 18741116
- Preceded by: San Andreas

Santorini is the final novel by Scottish author Alistair MacLean, first published in 1986.

The book was a best seller.

== Plot introduction ==
While on station in the Aegean Sea under the guise of a hydrographic survey mission, the crew of Royal Navy electronic intelligence vessel HMS Ariadne witnesses two disasters at once, a mysterious strategic bomber crashing into the sea and a large pleasure yacht on fire and sinking. The plane turns out to have been loaded with nuclear weapons, and the survivors rescued from the yacht (who include a wealthy Greek tycoon) appear somehow connected with the plane's destruction. With potential saboteurs aboard, Commander Talbot and the crew of the Ariadne must raise the one activated weapon before it can explode, setting off the others by sympathetic detonation and causing the nearby volcano of Santorini to explode in a tremendous eruption which would bring on a devastating tsunami and possibly a worldwide nuclear winter.
