= All About Lawrence of Arabia =

1962 non-fiction book by Alistair MacLean

All About Lawrence of Arabia is a 1962 book about T. E. Lawrence, a British officer in World War I. The book was written by Alistair MacLean for teenagers. It focuses on Lawrence's exploits as leader of the Arab forces battling in the Arabian desert.
