= HMS Ulysses (novel) =

1955 novel by Alistair MacLean

- First edition
- Author: Alistair MacLean
- Illustrator: John Rose
- Language: English
- Publisher: Collins
- Publication date: 1955
- Publication place: United Kingdom
- Media type: Print (Hardcover)
- Pages: 357 pp (1994 paperback)
- Followed by: The Guns of Navarone

HMS Ulysses is the debut novel by Scottish author Alistair MacLean. Originally published in 1955, it was also released by Fontana Books in 1960. MacLean's experiences in the Royal Navy during the Second World War provided the background and the Arctic convoys to Murmansk and Arkhangelsk provided the basis for the story, which was written at a publisher's request after he had won a short-story competition the previous year.

Some editions carry a prefatory note disavowing any connection between the fictional cruiser HMS Ulysses and the U-class destroyer of the same name.

In 1977 Maclean called it the book "dearest to my heart because it is true".

== Synopsis ==
The novel concerns HMS Ulysses, a light cruiser that is well armed and among the fastest ships in the world. Her crew is pushed well beyond the limits of endurance and the book starts in the aftermath of a mutiny. Ulysses puts to sea again as the flagship of FR-77, a vital convoy heading for Murmansk. They are beset by numerous challenges: an unusually fierce Arctic storm, Kriegsmarine ships and U-boats, as well as Luftwaffe air attacks. All slowly reduce the convoy from 32 ships to only five. Ulysses is sunk in a failed attempt to ram a German cruiser after all her other weapons had been destroyed. This echoes events in which the G-class destroyer HMS Glowworm and HMS Jervis Bay, an armed merchant cruiser, that sacrificed themselves by engaging larger opponents.

== Background ==
Maclean was a school teacher whose short story The Dileas had won a competition in the Glasgow Herald. It was read by the wife of Ian Chapman, an executive at publisher William Collins, who encouraged her husband to read it. Chapman admired the story, calling it "a marvellously moving and evocative piece of writing". He met with Maclean and encouraged him to write a novel based on the author's experience on a convoy to Murmansk. Maclean originally refused, believing there was no future in it, but changed his mind when boat business failed. He started writing it in September 1954 and finished it by December. The book was based on convoys Maclean had participated in when a sailor aboard HMS Royalist. Chapman was impressed ("he had written a novel [or as he would prefer to call it, anti-war novel] with devastating effect") and sent it to his superiors who agreed to publish offering a £1,000 advance.

Maclean later described how he wrote,

I drew a cross square, lines down representing the characters, lines across representing chapters 1–15. Most of the characters died, in fact only one survived the book, but when I came to the end the graph looked somewhat lopsided, there were too many people dying in the first, fifth and tenth chapters so I had to rewrite it, giving an even dying space throughout. I suppose it sounds cold blooded and calculated, but that's the way I did it.

== Ships featured in HMS Ulysses ==
HMS Ulysses is similar to the real Dido-class cruisers; MacLean had served in Royalist of that class. Ulysses was sent on Arctic convoys without rest. Commander Brooks describes it as the "only ship in the Home Fleet equipped for carrier command".

HMS Duke of Cumberland is a King George V-class battleship. A boarding party of Royal Marines from Duke of Cumberland was sent to put down a stokers' "mutiny" on Ulysses before the beginning of the book. Lieutenant Nicholls complains that the Duke of Cumberland is useless and never sailed to escort convoys.

HMS Stirling is an obsolete World War I-era C-class cruiser of the Ceres sub-group (referred to as Cardiff Class in the novel). Stirling is virtually untouched during most of the novel, until the final act where it is attacked by dive bombers .

HMS Defender, Invader, Wrestler and Blue Ranger, are smaller American-built escort carriers converted from merchant ships (Avenger or Attacker-classes). Accidents and enemy attacks conspire to remove all the carriers from service before the convoy is even half way to Russia. Defender in particular is rendered inoperable due to a freak accident, part of the flight deck is torn off during a storm.

Smaller escorts included HMS Sirrus, an S-class destroyer, the newest warship in the escort group. HMS Vectra and HMS Viking, World War I-vintage V and W-class destroyers. HMS Portpatrick, a Town-class destroyer, another obsolete US World War I design. HMS Baliol, a Type 1 Hunt-class destroyer described as "diminutive" and completely unseaworthy for the harsh weather of the North Atlantic. There is HMS Nairn, a River-class frigate, HMS Eager, a fleet minesweeper, and HMS Gannet, a Kingfisher-class sloop, nicknamed Huntley and Palmer due to her boxy superstructure resembling a biscuit tin.

== Reception ==
The book sold a quarter of a million copies in hardback in Britain in the first six months of publication. It went on to sell millions more. Chapman called it "a publishing phenomenon".

== Literary significance and criticism ==
The novel received good critical notices, with a number of reviewers putting it in the same class as two other 1950s classic tales of World War II at sea, Herman Wouk's The Caine Mutiny (set in the Pacific) and Nicholas Monsarrat's The Cruel Sea (set in the Atlantic).

== Allusions ==
The same background of the Arctic convoys of World War II, with the combination of extreme belligerent action and inhospitable nature pushing protagonists to the edge of endurance and beyond, appears in Dutch novelist Jan de Hartog's The Captain (1967). Comparisons may also be drawn with Wolfgang Ott's 1957 novel Sharks and Little Fish, written from the viewpoint of a sailor who serves on surface ships and submarines of the Kriegsmarine.

The use of ship names derived from classical mythology is a well-established practice of the Royal Navy. Bill Baley suggests that the choice of Ulysses might have been deliberate,

Unlike in Joyce's famous book, there are here no specific scenes clearly reminiscent of specific ones in Homer's Odyssey; but overall, it was Homer's Ulysses who gave Western culture the enduring template of a long and harrowing sea voyage where peril waits at every moment and of which few of the crew would survive to see the end.

Soviet novelist Valentin Pikul chose a quotation from the novel as an epigraph to his Requiem for Convoy PQ-17.

== Film, TV and theatrical adaptations ==
=== Abandoned film projects ===
Film rights were bought by Robert Clark of Associated British Picture Corporation in the 1950s for £30,000. He arranged for a script to be written by R. C. Sherriff, who had just adapted The Dambusters for Associated British; because of the amount of naval detail included, it proved troublesome for Sherriff; ABPC never made the film. Another proposed film version was announced by the Rank Organisation at the Cannes Film Festival in 1980 but then was abandoned when Rank pulled out of film making. HMS Ulysses has never been filmed but it was adapted by Nick McCarty for a BBC Radio 4 play of the same name which was first aired on 14 June 1997 in the Classic Play series. It starred Sir Derek Jacobi as Captain Vallery and Sir Donald Sinden as Admiral Starr.

== Comic adaptation ==
=== Japanese Manga ===
HMS Ulysses was highly acclaimed and popular in Japan. The book was serialised in Weekly Shōnen Sunday as Japanese Manga arranged by Kai Takizawa and illustrated by Taiyou Noguchi in 1970. But the Manga has never been published as a Tankōbon.

== See also ==
- Arctic convoys of World War II
- Convoy PQ 17, an Arctic convoy almost destroyed by the Germans in 1942
- JW 58, the convoy MacLean sailed with on Operation Tungsten
- The Captain (novel) with the same background
