= Breakheart Pass (novel) =

1974 novel by Alistair MacLean

- First edition cover (UK)
- Author: Alistair MacLean (1922–1987)
- Language: English
- Genre: Western Thriller
- Publisher: Collins (UK); Doubleday (US)
- Publication date: 1974
- Publication place: United Kingdom (Scotland)
- Media type: Print
- Pages: 256 pp.
- ISBN: 0-00-615805-6
- OCLC: 16481828
- Preceded by: The Way to Dusty Death
- Followed by: Circus

Breakheart Pass is a novel by Scottish author Alistair MacLean (1922–1987), first published in 1974. It was a departure for MacLean in that, despite the thriller novel plot, the setting is essentially that of a western novel, set in the Sierra Nevada of the American West in the late 19th century. Fans of MacLean will recognize the usual plots twists, thrill-packed finale, and trademark sardonic dialogue. For American audiences, MacLean was less successful capturing an authentic tone of the western frontier, and the 1975 movie version starring Charles Bronson, Richard Crenna, Ben Johnson, and Jill Ireland, proved to be more popular with the public than the novel.

== Plot introduction ==
The story begins with a perilous winter railroad journey through the Sierra Nevada in the 1870s in the midst of a blizzard. Aboard the train are Nevada state governor Fairchild and his niece Marica, along with U.S. Army cavalry Colonel Claremont and two carloads of troops. Joining them are U.S. Marshal Pearce, the governor's aide, and Pearce's old Army buddy Major O'Brien. Pearce, a lawman and Indian agent is transporting supposedly dangerous murderer and gunman John Deakin. Their destination is the remote Fort Humboldt deep in the Nevada mountains, whose troops have recently been decimated by a cholera epidemic. (This Fort Humboldt is fictional and has no connection with the Fort Humboldt State Historic Park in California.) Dr. Molyneaux, a tropical disease expert, is also accompanying the group.

As the journey continues we slowly learn that all is not what it seems, and that none of the characters is telling the whole truth. MacLean meticulously obliterates the lines defining exactly which characters are the good guys and which are the bad. As the story winds down, the cunningly devious nature of the plan is finally revealed.

== Background ==
Producer Elliot Kastner says he gave MacLean an office at 20th Century Fox to write the novel as therapy, as he says MacLean was suffering in his marriage and with alcoholism.

== Reception ==
The book became a best seller.
