= Seawitch =

1977 novel by Alistair MacLean

- First edition cover (UK)
- Author: Alistair MacLean
- Language: English
- Genre: Thriller novel
- Publisher: Collins (UK); Doubleday (US)
- Publication date: 1977
- Publication place: United Kingdom
- Media type: Print
- Pages: 286
- ISBN: 0-449-23597-1
- OCLC: 4311544
- Preceded by: The Golden Gate
- Followed by: Goodbye California

Seawitch is a novel written by the Scottish author Alistair MacLean. It was first published in the United Kingdom by Collins in 1977 and later in the same year by Doubleday in the United States.

It was written in Mexico, where MacLean would not be taxed by US authorities. The book deviates from MacLean's usual mystery/drama formula in that it is almost all action, with no mystery and no "traitor amongst them" sub-plot.

The book was a best seller. The New York Times review said MacLean "stumbles badly".

== Plot introduction ==
Lord Worth, ruthless man, has made a lot of enemies in the oil business. His new offshore tension-leg platform oil rig in the Gulf of Mexico, named Seawitch, is one of the biggest in the world, the only one of its kind, and will put his competitors out of business. To destroy it and therefore be able to inflate the price of oil at will, the competitors get together and send one man to deal with Lord Worth. The villain has a personal score to settle with Worth and kidnaps his daughters. But Lord Worth's daughters are betrothed to the protagonists, Mitchell and Roomer, two former police detectives, now private investigators. They set trying to save Worth and his daughters, as the villain intends to leave them on Seawitch when he destroys it with a stolen nuclear weapon.
