= The Way to Dusty Death =

1973 novel by Alistair MacLean

- First edition cover (UK)
- Author: Alistair MacLean
- Language: English
- Genre: Thriller novel
- Publisher: Collins (UK); Doubleday (US)
- Publication date: 1973
- Publication place: United Kingdom
- Media type: Print (Hardback & Paperback)

The Way to Dusty Death is a thriller novel written by Scottish author Alistair MacLean. It was originally published in 1973. The title is a quotation from the famous soliloquy in Act 5, Scene 5 in Shakespeare’s play Macbeth.

The book was published in 1973 and became a best seller.

The Chicago Tribune thought Maclean was writing "as a parody of himself".

== Plot introduction ==
The protagonist, Johnny Harlow, a world champion Formula 1 racing driver, was in a devastating accident during the French Grand Prix, which caused the death of his best friend, a Californian driver and Isaac Jethou, along with maiming his girlfriend. It is only one of a series of crashes which have dogged the Grand Prix circuit in the past season, one of which led to the death of Harlow’s younger brother.

The crash appears to have completely destroyed Harlow’s nerve, and the boss of the Coronado team, MacAlpine, for which he drives, is torn between wanting to keep his star driver, and concerns that Harlow has turned into an alcoholic.

However, Harlow is playing a role, as he suspects that there is more behind these "accidents" than “acts of God”, and soon finds out that a few people will do anything to prevent him from discovering the truth.

== Proposed film adaptation ==
The story was originally written as a screenplay. It was meant to star Maclean's friend Jackie Stewart and be produced by MacLean's second wife.*Johnston, Iaine (4 December 1977). "The Man with the Golden Typewriter". Sunday Telegraph Magazine. p. 36.

In August 1972 Scott Finch said he was going to work on the script to what was then called The Way to Dusty Death. At one stage J. Lee Thompson, who had directed Guns of Navarone, was attached to direct.

The novel came out in September 1973 the New York Times declaring "MacLean does not miss one cliche." The book became a best seller.

In October 1973 it was reported that filming of the movie version was postponed "indefinitely."

In 1976 Maclean's second wife Mary formed a company with producer Peter Snell, Aleelle Productions, who aimed to make movies based on MacLean novels including Golden Gate, Bear Island, The Way to Dusty Death and Captain Cook.

In 1976 Don Sharp was working on the film, with John Gay to write the script, for producer John Gay but they were unable to raise money.

Film rights were taken away from MacLean's wife following their divorce in 1977. In 1979 Peter Snell, who produced the film adaptation of Maclean's Bear Island, said he wanted to film The Way of Dusty Death next. However the film did not eventuate for over a decade, when it emerged as a TV movie.

== TV movie ==
The Way to Dusty Death
- Based on: The Way to Dusty Death by Alistair MacLean
- Directed by: Geoffrey Reeve
- Country of origin: United States
- Original language: English

Production
- Budget: $8.5 million

Original release
- Release: 1995

The Way to Dusty Death appeared as a 1995 made-for-TV movie directed by Geoffrey Reeve starring Simon MacCorkindale as Harlow and Linda Hamilton as romantic interest Marie MacAlpine.

=== Cast ===
- Linda Hamilton as Beth MacAlpine
- Simon MacCorkindale as Johnny Harlow
- Uwe Ochsenknecht as Gerhard Tracchia
- Anthony Valentine as James MacAlpine
- Serena Scott Thomas as Alexis Dunetskaya
- Tom Burlinson as Ike Jethou
- Olegar Fedoro as Braggi
- Christopher Cazenove as Paul Vincennes

=== Production ===
Peter Snell managed to get the film financed as a TV movie. It was made by Delux Productions, a company set up by CLT, owner of the Luxembourg- based TV network RTL. The show was made to be sold in the United States and across Europe.
