= Penny Casdagli =

Greek actress (born 1948)

Alexis Penny Casdagli
- Born: 15 August 1948 (age 77); Phaleron, Greece
- Occupations: Actress, playwright
- Years active: 1968–present
- Spouse: Ian Giles (m. 1973, divorced)

Alexis Penny Casdagli (born 15 August 1948) is a Greek writer, director and actress.

== Early life ==
She was born to Alexis Theodore Casdagli (a former prisoner of war) and Winifred Wendy Casdagli (née Levrett), who both served in the Second World War as a Major and Captain respectively. After the war ended, they met whilst serving in Volos, marrying in 1947 and giving birth to their daughter the following year in the midst of the Greek Civil War. In 1949, she was christened Penelope Sherrie in the bell of an upturned warship in the harbour. Legally, it was British soil, so her parents could get her a passport in case of an emergency exit from the war-torn country.

== Acting ==
She trained as a dancer at the Arts Educational School before studying at the Royal Central School of Speech and Drama. Her TV acting work includes Judge Dee, Jubilee, Doctor Who (1979's Destiny of the Daleks) and Grange Hill as well as playing 24-year-old heroin addict Trudi in 1970 film, Puppet on a Chain.

== Personal life and Theatre ==
Whilst at theatre school, which was a girls' boarding school, Casdagli discovered that she was a lesbian but kept it hidden. Despite this, she married Ian Giles, associate director of Tyneside Theatre Company (the group she was appearing with at the time) at a private wedding in Newcastle on 25 June 1973. Over the years, Casdagli participated in pieces of lesbianism via various workshops, finding inspiration from the Women Live festival in 1980. By the 1980s, she decided to come out while touring in an Alan Ayckbourn play. The negative response from her colleagues caused Casdagli to give up acting.

Under the pen name Maro Green, she has written a number of plays, usually with a particular emphasis on lesbianism and the feminist movement. She has also written plays for young people, often with an emphasis on the use of sign language for the deaf.

In 1987, Casdagli received the British Drama Award for the Best Young People's Play for Pardon Mr Punch. That same year, she founded the theatre company Neti-Neti (the name being a Zen term for ‘not this and not that’) with Caroline Griffin, leaving in 1995.

She is the director of publishers Cylix Press. With this company, she compiled and edited Prouder Than Ever: My War + My Diary + My Embroideries, the war diary of her father, and Loyal To The Hill: My Home + My Diary + My Harrow, the 1920 schoolboy diary of her father.
