= River of Death =

1981 novel by Alistair MacLean

- First edition (UK)
- Author: Alistair MacLean
- Language: English
- Genre: Thriller novel
- Publisher: Collins (UK); Doubleday (US)
- Publication date: 1981
- Publication place: United Kingdom
- Media type: Print
- Pages: 215 pp.
- ISBN: 0-449-20058-2
- OCLC: 9470816
- Preceded by: Athabasca
- Followed by: Partisans

River of Death is a novel by Scottish author Alistair MacLean, first published in 1981. As with most of MacLean's novels, it depicts adventure, treachery, and murder in an unforgiving environment, set this time in the steamy jungles of South America.

== Plot introduction ==
In 1945, with the Allies approaching, two German officers ransack a monastery in Greece and make plans to escape with the loot. One of the Germans is left behind by his partner, while the other escapes by submarine from Wilhelmshaven. Twenty years elapse. A wealthy millionaire, Smith, hires Hamilton, allegedly an expert on the jungle, to lead him to the ruins of a lost Indian civilization recently discovered in the wilderness of the Amazon jungle in Brazil. The entourage faces giant anacondas, giant spiders (only mentioned in a conversation), cannibalistic natives, and so on, discovering a settlement of Nazi war criminals and their descendants, living as if the Third Reich had never ended. It is soon clear that Smith's real purpose has little to do with archaeology, and more to do with revenge.

== Reception ==
The Globe and Mail book reviewer wrote that "It's hard to know what's been happening to Alistair Maclean since he wrote such solidly constructed thrillers as When Eight Bells Toll and The Guns of Navarone. More and more, structure, characterization and originality seem to have yielded to a haphazard mixture of contrived melodrama and bizarre geographic phenomena. His latest, River of Death... almost suggests he is now aiming for the kind of semi- juvenile market that once existed for adventure yarns with incredibly endowed British heroes pitted against nature's perils and foreign villainy in Pago Pago or Walla Walla."

However the book was a best seller.

== Film adaptation ==
River of Death was adapted into a 1989 movie directed by Steve Carver and starring Michael Dudikoff, Robert Vaughn, and Donald Pleasence.
