= River of Death (film) =

1989 American action film

- Directed by: Steve Carver
- Written by: Andrew Deutsch; Edward Simpson
- Produced by: Avi Lerner; Harry Alan Towers
- Starring: Michael Dudikoff
- Cinematography: Avraham Karpick
- Music by: Sasha Matson
- Production companies: Breton Film Productions; Cannon International; Pathé Communications
- Distributed by: Cannon Film Distributors (United States); Cineplex Odeon Films (Canada); Dela Corporation (Japan)
- Release date: September 29, 1989
- Countries: United Kingdom; United States; France
- Languages: English; German

River of Death is a 1989 American action film written and directed by Steve Carver and starring Michael Dudikoff. It is based on the 1981 novel of the same name by Alistair MacLean.

== Plot ==
In the nightmarish last days of the Third Reich, a psychotic Nazi scientist (Robert Vaughn) escapes to the impenetrable jungles of the Amazon. Years later, a mysterious incurable disease breaks out among the natives and adventurer John Hamilton (Michael Dudikoff) is hired to lead investigators on a search for the cause. Braving bloodthirsty river pirates, hostile native tribes and headhunting cannibals, Hamilton guides a group of explorers up the deadly Rio del Morte to the fabulous lost Inca city.

== Production ==
According to director Steve Carver, the movie was originally to be shot in Brazil. But this turned out too expensive. South Africa's Port St. Johns was then chosen as a location which, according to Carver was "dangerous as all hell". "We were lucky no one got killed."

Carver enjoyed working with actors Herbert Lom, Robert Vaughn and Donald Pleasence: "These guys were professionals. They would carry the equipment up the mountainside with the crew. Fantastic actors. You would tell them something, give them changes in dialogue and – boom! – they know it in seconds. You never have problems with these actors."

River of Death was shot during the cultural boycott, which resulted in director Steve Carver being fined by the Directors Guild of America. Carver remained unapologetic in 2020: "I had ignored the apartheid, because I am not political. I couldn’t give a damn about their apartheid at that time."

== Cast ==
- Michael Dudikoff as John Hamilton
- Robert Vaughn as Wolfgang Manteuffel
- Donald Pleasence as Heinrich Spaatz
- Herbert Lom as Colonel Ricardo Diaz
- L. Q. Jones as Hiller
- Sarah Maur Thorp as Anna Blakesley
- Cynthia Erland as Maria
- Gordon Mulholland as Fanjul
- Ian Yule as John "Long John" Silver

== Reception ==
The Los Angeles Times said "this hapless movie's strategy seems to be to squeeze Alistair MacLean's story lugubriously through the send-up style of "Raiders of the Lost Ark" and hope the jungle scenery and desultory hamminess of Pleasence and Herbert Lom (as another villain) will distract the audience from everything else. It doesn't work."
