= The Golden Gate (MacLean novel) =

1976 novel by Alistair MacLean

- First edition cover (UK)
- Author: Alistair MacLean
- Language: English
- Genre: Thriller novel
- Publisher: Collins (UK); Doubleday (US)
- Publication date: 1976
- Publication place: United Kingdom
- Media type: Print
- ISBN: 0-00-222259-0
- Preceded by: Circus
- Followed by: Seawitch

The Golden Gate is a novel written by the Scottish author Alistair MacLean. It was first released in the United Kingdom by Collins in 1976 and later in the same year by Doubleday in the United States.

== Plot ==
A team of criminals led by mastermind Peter Branson kidnaps the President of the United States and his two guests from the Middle East, a prince and a king, on San Francisco's Golden Gate Bridge, in a masterfully conceived and clockwork-timed operation. Branson and his men block off both ends of the bridge, wire it with explosives, and demand half a billion dollars and a full pardon for themselves. Any rescue attempts will result in the detonation of the explosives, which will kill the President (and his guests) and destroy the Golden Gate Bridge.

However, Branson is an egomaniac, and he cannot resist attention from the media. So he invites the press to stay on the bridge and cover the story. Aware that the FBI will have placed agents among them, he takes the precaution of searching them and removing the armed ones. However, Hagenbach (the FBI's dour but extremely adept head agent) has an ace in the hole: a hand-picked special agent, Paul Revson, who was equipped with only a camera. Allowed to remain on the bridge, Revson sets out to foil Branson's plans and rescue the President.

With the help of a doctor and a female journalist, Revson gets a message to his superiors, suggesting various courses of action: supplying drugged food to the terrorists, placing a submarine under the bridge, and trying to neutralize the terrorists' equipment with a laser beam. He also arranges for several carefully disguised weapons and gadgets to be smuggled to him. Working on both ends, Revson, Hagenbach, and those working with them unleash their own carefully conceived plans.

== Characters ==
In the story, most of the good guys make their appearances after most of the bad guys, of whom there are 17:

- Peter Branson, a criminal mastermind and leader of the plot
- Van Effen, a skilled driver and Branson's right-hand man
- Chrysler, a communications and electronics expert
- Yonnie, a boxer
- Bartlett
- Reston, an explosives expert
- Harrison, an explosives expert
- Mack
- Johnson, a helicopter pilot
- Bradley, a helicopter pilot
- Giscard, who poses as a cop
- Parker, who poses as a cop
- Harriman, who poses as Jensen
- Kowalski, a Vietnam veteran
- Peters, a Vietnam veteran and medic (field corpsman)
- Bartlett
- Boyard

Opposing the villains are the following characters, many of whom are hostages:

- Paul Revson, an FBI agent and the hero
- April Wednesday, a fashion photographer and Revson's love interest
- O'Hare, a doctor and ambulance driver
- President of the United States, a prime hostage
- Richards, the Vice President of the United States
- King of Saudi Arabia, a prime hostage
- Iman, the oil minister of the King of Saudi Arabia and a prime hostage
- Prince Achmed, a prime hostage
- Kharan, the oil minister of Prince Achmed and a prime hostage
- Hansen, the US Secretary of Energy
- Milton, the US Secretary of State
- Quarry, the US Secretary of the Treasury
- Muir, the US Under-Secretary of State
- John Morrison, Mayor of San Francisco
- Bernard Hendrix, the Chief of the San Francisco Police
- Campbell, a captain of the San Francisco Police
- Cartland, a general in the US Army
- James Hagenbach, the chief of the FBI
- Jacobs, an assistant to Hagenbach
- Jensen, the deputy director of the FBI
- Isaacs, a doctor and the chief of the FBI's Drugs and Narcotics Section
- Kylenski, a doctor and a leading forensic expert, specializing in poisons
- Newson, an admiral in the US Navy and commander of their forces on the west coast
- Carter, a general in the US Army and commander of their forces on the west coast
- Boyann, a communications expert
- Pearson, the captain of a US Navy submarine
- Charles Rogers, a member of a US Army bomb disposal squad
- Carmody, a member of a US Army bomb disposal squad
- Hopkins, a driver of a flat truck
- Dougan, a journalist with Reuters
- Grafton, a journalist with the Associated Press
- Ferrers, a journalist
- Tony, a driver of a food delivery van

== Background ==
The book was the first of three MacLean wrote set in California. MacLean said in 1976 it was "the best thing I've done."

== Reception ==
The book was a best seller.

The Los Angeles Times thought Maclean was "going through the motions". The New York Times thought it was "nonsense, but agreeable nonsense... fun."

== Proposed film version ==
In 1975 a film was going to be made by Warner Bros. starring Charles Bronson and directed by J. Lee Thompson (who had directed a film based on MacLean's Guns of Navarone). However they could not find a script they were happy with.

Film rights were bought by Lew Grade's ITC, who announced in October 1977 that the film version would be part of a slate of films worth $97 million. Filming was to begin in February 1978 from a script by Marc Norman and directed by Jerry Jameson. However filming did not take place. In October 1978 ITC announced the film was one of their "contemplated productions." The film was never made.
