= Fear Is the Key (film) =

1972 film by Michael Tuchner based on the 1961 novel

- Theatrical release poster
- Directed by: Michael Tuchner
- Screenplay by: Robert Carrington
- Based on: Fear Is the Key by Alistair MacLean
- Produced by: Jay Kanter; Alan Ladd, Jr. executive Elliot Kastner
- Starring: Barry Newman; Suzy Kendall
- Cinematography: Alex Thomson
- Edited by: Ray Lovejoy
- Music by: Roy Budd
- Production company: Kastner-Ladd-Kanter
- Distributed by: Anglo EMI Film Distributors Limited
- Release date: 26 December 1972 (United Kingdom)
- Running time: 105 minutes
- Country: United Kingdom
- Language: English
- Budget: £541,536

Fear Is the Key is a 1972 British action thriller film directed by Michael Tuchner and starring Barry Newman and Suzy Kendall. It is based on the 1961 novel of the same title by Alistair MacLean. It was the feature film debut of Ben Kingsley. The soundtrack is by Roy Budd.

== Plot ==
John Talbot is talking on radio to a woman and a man who is flying a plane. He hears them being machine gunned to death by another plane.

Some time later, Talbot appears in a small town in Louisiana, where he starts a fight with some local police. He is arrested and faces trial, where it is revealed he is wanted for killing a policeman and robbing a bank. Talbot escapes from the courtroom, shooting another policeman and kidnapping a woman, Sarah Ruthven.

A car chase ensues. Talbot and Sarah meet up with a mysterious man, Jablonsky, who reveals that Sarah is the daughter of an oil millionaire.

Jablonsky turns Talbot and Sarah over to Sarah's father. A man working for him, Vyland, hires Talbot for an unspecified task. Jablonsky is retained to guard Talbot. It is then revealed that Jablonsky and Talbot know each other and have arranged the whole scenario for an unspecified reason.

Late at night, Talbot sneaks out of the house and travels to an oil platform to search for something. When he returns he sees Vyland's henchmen burying something – it is Jablonsky's body.

Talbot then sneaks into Sarah's room and makes a confession: all the events up until the present time are part of a scheme. The brawl in the town was to get Talbot into court. The shootout in court was faked; Talbot shot the policeman with blanks. Sarah was invited there deliberately so she could be kidnapped. Everything was set up to get Talbot and Jablonsky into the house. Talbot says her father used his money for a stake in a salvage operation but didn't know about Vyland, and that Sarah and her father are in danger, especially after the death of Jablonsky. Talbot asks Sarah for her help, although he won't say what his plan is or what is going on.

Talbot is hired to operate a submersible for an unspecified project. He goes to an oil platform with Sarah, Ruthven, Vyland, Royale and Larry. Talbot deliberately delays the launch of the submersible.

Larry begins to suspect Talbot and pulls a gun on him but falls off the platform and dies. With Sarah's help, Talbot then kills another of Vyland's men. He calls for help from the mainland but the authorities cannot fly to the platform because of the storm. He is forced to enter the submersible with Vyland and Royale.

The submersible approaches the wreck of a Douglas DC-3. Vyland admits to Talbot he is looking for the cargo. Talbot says he knows what the cargo is – $85 million in gold bars, emeralds and uncut diamonds. Talbot then switches off the oxygen and tells Vyland and Royale they will all die in six minutes.

Talbot says the gold, emeralds and diamonds were a payment from the Colombian government to the International Monetary Fund to pay for arms during a revolution. They hired a plane from an obscure, small airline – Talbot's – but it was shot down by people who knew what was on the flight. Talbot says the plane contained his brother, his wife and his 3-year-old son. He has planned his revenge over three years.

Talbot tells Vyland and Royale he is willing to die on the ocean floor beside his family. He asks who ordered the destruction of the plane. Vyland confesses it was him, which is heard by Talbot's associates on the oil platform via microphone. Royale shoots Vyland dead. He then confesses to killing Jablonsky. Talbot turns on the oxygen and returns to the surface.

== Cast ==
- Barry Newman as John Talbot
- Suzy Kendall as Sarah Ruthven
- John Vernon as Vyland
- Dolph Sweet as Jablonsky
- Ben Kingsley as Royale
- Ray McAnally as Ruthven
- Peter Marinker as Larry
- Elliott Sullivan as Judge Mollison
- Roland Brand as deputy
- Tony Anholt as FBI agent
- John Alderson as Tanner (uncredited)
- James Berwick as (uncredited)
- Hal Galili as Cibatti (uncredited)
- Ernie Heldman as bartender (uncredited)

== Production ==
The novel was published in 1961. In August 1966 it was announced producers Jerry Gershwin and Elliott Kastner bought the rights to five screenplays by Alistair Maclean, starring with Where Eagles Dare (1968) and When Eight Bells Toll (1971). Kastner alone produced these two films which were both popular, particularly Where Eagles Dare. However, in 1969 Maclean said that although he felt Fear is the Key was his favorite book it would not be a movie - "I think it's my best writing but I am told that it would be too expensive to film."

In June 1971 it was announced that a film would be made by Nat Cohen's Ango-EMI (EMI Films), produced by Kastner, Alan Ladd Jnr and Jay Kaner. EMI Films had just financed the producer's movie Villain (1971), directed by Tuchner, who would be hired to do Fear is the Key. MacLean had written the scripts for When Eight Bells Toll and Where Eagles Dare (1968), but was too busy to write the script for Fear is the Key so the job went to Robert Carrington. T

Filming took place at Bray Studios London starting May 1972, after which the film went on location to Louisiana. The car chase was choreographed by Carey Loftin, who had worked on Vanishing Point (1971) which also starred Barry Newman (and which Newman thought was why he may have been cast in Fear is the Key). Newman said he enjoyed making the movie: "I thought the character that I played was a lovely character for the kind of film it was, an Alistair MacLean story." The other star was Suzy Kendall. Kastner said "we have now reached a stage where we have a writer who is more important than the stars."

In July 1972 Paramount Pictures announced they acquired rights to distribute the film in the Western hemisphere.

== Reception ==
=== Critical ===
Variety called it "well made action stuff."

The Monthly Film Bulletin wrote: "The latest in the prolific series of Alistair MacLean screen adaptations proves to be a brisk and cleverly plotted thriller with enough narrative surprises to compel interest right to the cliffhanging finish, and to justify the makers' potentially reckless decision to place their most effective set-piece – a 20-minute allstops-out car chase – right at the beginning of the film. Script and characterisation are fairly rudimentary, but the pressure-cooker intensity of Barry Newman's acting makes him the perfect protagonist in a revenge story, while for director Michael Tuchner the film is a distinct advance on his earlier thriller, Villain."

The Radio Times Guide to Films gave the film 3/5 stars, writing: "Satisfying action thriller ... An excitingly staged car chase gets things off to a cracking start and Newman makes a convincingly hyped-up hero."

Leslie Halliwell said: "Reasonably absorbing, surprise-plotted thriller."

=== Box office ===
The film was a box office disappointment in the US but performed better in Europe. It was one of the most popular movies of 1973 at the British box office.
