= Caravan to Vaccarès =

1970 novel by Alistair MacLean

- First edition cover by Norman Weaver
- Author: Alistair MacLean
- Language: English
- Genre: Thriller
- Publisher: Collins (UK); Doubleday (US)
- Publication date: 1970
- Publication place: United Kingdom
- Preceded by: Puppet on a Chain
- Followed by: Bear Island

Caravan to Vaccarès is a novel by author Alistair MacLean, originally published in 1970. This novel is set in the Provence region of southern France. The novel was originally written as a screenplay for producer Elliot Kastner.

== Plot ==
From all over Europe, even from behind the Iron Curtain, Gypsies make an annual pilgrimage to the holy shrine of their patron saint, Saint Sarah, in the Provence region of southern France. But something is different about this year's gathering, with many suspicious deaths. Cecile Dubois and Neil Bowman, a British agent, decide to investigate.

Eavesdropping, Bowman discovers that a man named Gaiuse Strome is financing the gypsies, and his suspicions on the real identity of Strome centre on a highly wealthy aristocrat, distinguished folklorist and gastronome, Le Grand Duc Charles de Croytor, whose girlfriend Lila Delafont is a friend of Cecile. As they follow the caravan, Bowman and Cecile find that their lives are in danger many times in an effort to uncover the secret the gypsies are so determined to hide, and before long are running for their lives.

== Reception ==
The New York Times called it "a gratifying entertainment."

The Observer praised the "good descriptions" but said "the plotting is so obscure it might have been grafted on from the wrong brain."

The book became a best seller.

== Film adaptation ==
The novel was adapted into a film in 1974 directed by Geoffrey Reeve and starring David Birney, Charlotte Rampling and Michael Lonsdale.

The idea for the film had come from Reeve, who was partners with MacLean in a business to make movies.
