= Larven =

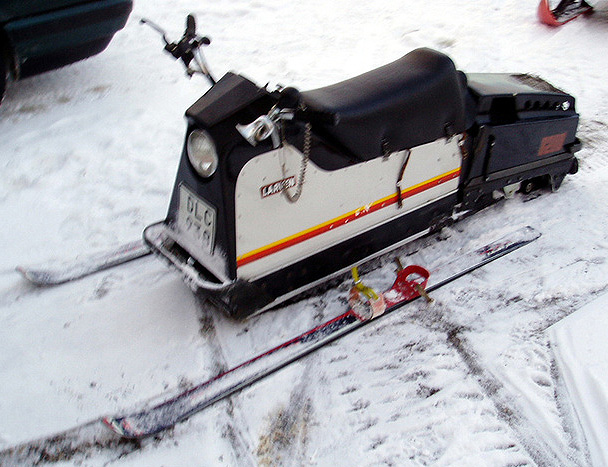
Larven

Larven ("Caterpillar") was a Swedish snowmobile that was manufactured from the 1960s to the 1980s in Östersund. The rider wears skis to control the vehicle. The machine itself only provided propulsion and a place to sit. The design was easy to stow in a car due its small size.

Two Larven machines were used in a dramatic chase scene in Bear Island, a 1979 film.
