= The Guns of Navarone (novel) =

1957 novel by Alistair MacLean

- First edition cover (UK)
- Author: Alistair MacLean
- Cover artist: John Rose
- Language: English
- Publisher: Collins (UK)
- Publication date: 1957
- Publication place: United Kingdom
- Media type: Print (hardback and paperback)
- Pages: 288
- Preceded by: HMS Ulysses
- Followed by: South by Java Head

The Guns of Navarone is a 1957 novel about the Second World War by Scottish writer Alistair MacLean that was made into the film The Guns of Navarone in 1961. The story concerns the efforts of an Allied commando team to destroy a seemingly impregnable German fortress that threatens Allied naval ships in the Aegean Sea and prevents over 1,200 isolated British Army soldiers from being rescued.

The Greek island of Navarone does not exist and the plot is fictional, but the story takes place within the real historical context of the 1943 Dodecanese campaign.

The Guns of Navarone brings together elements that would characterise much of MacLean's subsequent works: tough, competent, worldly men as main characters; frequent but non-graphic violence; betrayal of the hero(es) by a trusted associate; and extensive use of the sea and other dangerous environments as settings. Its three principal characters – New Zealand mountaineer-turned-commando Keith Mallory, American demolitions expert "Dusty" Miller, and Greek resistance fighter Andrea – are among the most fully drawn in all of MacLean's work.

== Historical background ==
The Greek island of Navarone does not exist and the plot is fictional, but the story takes place within the real historical context of the Dodecanese Campaign, the Allies' campaign to capture the Italian-held Greek islands in the Aegean Sea in 1943. In particular, the Battle of Leros and coastal artillery on the island of Leros provide inspiration for the novel. Sited on the island were 11 152mm/6 inch (an intermediate calibre) coastal artillery guns, along with a number of smaller guns. The guns had been manufactured and used by the Italians, and were captured with the island after the surrender of the British and Italian defenders; the guns were used by the Germans for the rest of the war.

== Plot ==
The island of Navarone, off the Turkish coast, has been heavily fortified as the Germans attempt to stifle British naval activity in the Aegean. A force of 1200 British soldiers is now marooned on the nearby island of Kheros (another variation of the island Keros, which is situated to the west of Amorgos) and the Royal Navy is planning to send ships to rescue them. The heavy radar-controlled guns command the only deepwater channel that ships can use and must be silenced at all costs.

Commando attacks have failed and after a bombardment by B-24 Liberator bombers fails to destroy the guns, Captain James Jensen RN, Chief of Operations for SOE in Cairo, decides to launch a desperate last-ditch attempt which he has already planned in case the bombing is unsuccessful. He has drawn together a team of specialist saboteurs to infiltrate the island via the "unclimbable" south cliff and get into the fortress to destroy the guns. They have less than one week.

The team meet for the first time in Alexandria. They comprise:

- Captain Keith Mallory – a New Zealand officer with the Long Range Desert Group (LRDG). Mallory was a pre-war mountain climber, nicknamed "The Human Fly". He has been operating in the mountains of German-held Crete.
- Andrea – a former Lt. Colonel in the Greek army, a ruthless fighter and close friend and confidante of Mallory.
- Corporal Dusty Miller – an American explosives expert who transferred from the R.A.F. to the LRDG. Miller is described as a stringy, cynical man who doubts their chances of success.
- Petty Officer Telegraphist Casey Brown – a Royal Navy engineer and veteran of the Special Boat Service. He is a native of Clydeside and worked as a testing and installation engineer pre-war.
- Lt Andrew Stevens R.N.V.R. – Stevens is a young naval officer chosen as navigator. Like Mallory, he speaks fluent Greek and is an experienced mountaineer but considers himself an abject coward.

The team travel via MTB and plane to Castelrosso, a British-held island. Here, they discover an eavesdropper, Nicolai the base laundry boy, who allegedly speaks no English but is spying on them anyway. They demand that he be arrested and held incommunicado, but the story implies that this does not happen.

In an ancient caïque they sail towards Navarone. They carry papers identifying themselves as collaborators with, and couriers for, the German commandant of the island. They are intercepted by a German patrol boat, which appears to be expecting them. They sink it and kill all the crew.

They are wrecked in a storm but manage to land on the island, having lost much of their equipment. They climb the 'unclimbable' south cliff, but Stevens slips and is badly injured.

Evading German guards, they travel through heavy snow and rough terrain and are met by Louki, the steward of the exiled owner of the island, and Panayis, his enigmatic friend. They bring much needed food. By radio, Jensen tells the team that they have less time than was planned for. The ships are coming through that very night. But whilst resting in a cave, they are captured by a troop of German specialist mountain soldiers led by Oberleutnant Turzig, who recognises Mallory as a famous climber. They are taken to the town of Margaritha where they are ruthlessly interrogated by Hauptmann Skoda. Thanks to Andrea's diversionary behaviour, they turn the tables on them and Skoda is shot. With Turzig and the others securely tied up, they escape and make their way to the town of Navarone. They are harassed by troops and planes who are also apparently expecting them.

With no medical facilities available, Stevens is clearly dying and beyond help. He asks to be left behind and feels curiously at peace. Miller discovers that much of his equipment has been damaged. Suspicion falls on Panayis, who is also suspected of being a double agent. He admits nothing, but the evidence (all but one of his injuries are fake) is damning. Miller shoots him.

Mallory and Miller manage to enter the fortress housing the guns, whilst the others create a diversion. They set the explosives and then get out to meet the others. They steal a boat and rendezvous with the destroyer HMS Sirdar, which is leading two others through the deepwater channel. Just in time, the explosives do their work, the guns are destroyed and the ships continue on their way to rescue the soldiers.

== Literary significance ==
In 1990 the British Crime Writers' Association placed The Guns of Navarone 89th on its list The Top 100 Crime Novels of All Time.

The success of the book's film adaptation prompted Alistair MacLean to write the only sequel of his writing career, Force 10 from Navarone (1968). However, in areas where they differ, this is a sequel to the film, not the book.

The name of The Guns of Avalon, a fantasy novel by writer Roger Zelazny, is considered a tongue-in cheek reference to MacLean's similarly titled novel. In addition to sounding alike, both Avalon and Navarone are fictional islands.

== Adaptations ==
=== Film ===
Carl Foreman wrote and produced a 1961 film adaptation.

=== Radio ===
In 1997, BBC Radio 2 produced a two-hour adaptation for radio written by Bert Coules and directed by Patrick Rayner. The cast included:

- Toby Stephens as "Mallory"
- David Rintoul as "Andrea"
- Michael Williams as "Commodore Jensen"
- John Guerrasio as "Miller"
- Alex Norton as "Brown"
- Peter Kenny as "Stevens"

=== Audiobook ===
The Guns of Navarone was also produced as an abridged audiobook with Patrick Allen narrating. Steven Pacey performed the unabridged version for Harper Audio.

== Sequels ==
Author Sam Llewellyn wrote two authorised sequels during the 1990s, Storm Force from Navarone and Thunderbolt from Navarone. These both featured Maclean's three heroes Mallory, Miller and Andrea along with Commander Jensen, R.N.
