= Circus (novel) =

1975 novel by Alistair MacLean

- First edition cover (UK)
- Author: Alistair MacLean
- Language: English
- Genre: Spy Novel Thriller novel
- Publisher: Collins (UK); Doubleday (US)
- Publication date: 1975
- Publication place: United Kingdom
- Media type: Print (Hardcover)
- Preceded by: Breakheart Pass
- Followed by: The Golden Gate

Circus is a novel written by the Scottish author Alistair MacLean. It was first released in the United Kingdom by Collins in 1975 and later in the same year by Doubleday in the United States.

== Plot introduction ==
Bruno Wildermann of the Wrinfield Circus is the world's greatest trapeze artist, a clairvoyant with near-supernatural powers and an implacable enemy of the East German regime that arrested his family and murdered his wife. The CIA needs such a man for an impossible raid on the impregnable Lubylan Fortress where his family is held, to remove a dangerous weapons formula from a heavily guarded laboratory. Under cover of a traveling circus tour, Bruno prepares to return to his homeland. But before the journey even begins a murderer strikes twice. Somewhere in the circus there is a communist agent with orders to stop Bruno at any cost.

== Background ==
In October 1973 it was announced Alistair Maclean was researching the novel, which would form the basis of a film called Circus to be made the following year by Irving Allen for 20th Century Fox in collaboration with the Ringling Circus. Allen had previously made The Big Circus (1959) but said Circus would be different, being shot in 70mm and 3D with a budget of $6 million. Maclean was researching the novel by travelling with the circus. The film was never made.

== Literary significance and criticism ==
The story, written in third person narrative, includes espionage, murder, romance and humor. Many MacLean fans do not consider this to be one of his finer works. It is typical of his later period works, in that while it is quite well plotted (if stretching the bounds of believability), it is simplistically characterized, with dryly sardonic and superbly competent protagonists (particularly Bruno Wildermann, the trapeze artist and secret agent), a ravishingly beautiful and virtually helpless female protagonist, and almost cartoonish Communist antagonists.

== Reception ==
The Los Angeles Times called it a "first rate piece of suspense".

The book was a best seller.

== In popular culture ==
In the film Operation Thunderbolt, Col. Yonatan Netanyahu (Yehoram Gaon) reads the novel en route to the 1976 Israeli raid on Entebbe Airport in Uganda.

In the 1978 film The Comeback, character Nick Cooper is reading the novel in bed.
