= Floodgate (novel) =

1983 novel by Alistair MacLean

- First edition cover (UK)
- Author: Alistair MacLean
- Language: English
- Genre: Thriller novel
- Publisher: Collins (UK); Doubleday (US)
- Publication date: 1983
- Publication place: United Kingdom
- Media type: Print (Hardback & Paperback)
- Pages: 310 pp
- ISBN: 0-00-222754-1
- Preceded by: Partisans
- Followed by: San Andreas

Floodgate is a novel by Scottish author Alistair MacLean, first published in 1983.

It is a rare example of inter-novel continuity in MacLean's writing, as one of the characters in his previous novel Puppet on a Chain makes a re-appearance.

== Plot introduction ==
A mysterious terrorist organization known as the "FFF" has detonated a mine which bursts dykes in the Netherlands and caused massive flooding of Amsterdam's Schiphol Airport. Unless their demands are met (i.e. immediate withdrawal of all British military forces from Northern Ireland), they threaten to detonate more mines, flooding Holland beneath a wall of water from the North Sea.

Colonel van de Graaf, the Amsterdam Chief of Police, puts Detective Lieutenant Peter van Effen, a man with a sardonic sense of humor and many hidden talents, in charge of the investigation. Lieutenant van Effen is also an undercover operative with connections to a Dutch criminal gang; posing as a criminal explosives expert and with the help of fellow undercover officers Vasco (as a corrupt Dutch Army officer) and George (as a black market arms dealer), he sets out to infiltrate the FFF and sabotage their plans one way or another. Matters, however, take an unexpected and dangerous turn when van Effen's sister Julie and Annemarie Meijer (an undercover policewoman and the daughter of a powerful Dutch industrialist) are kidnapped and held hostage by the FFF.

=== Note ===
Remarkably, in the Dutch translation of the book (Hoogwater), the plot has been changed and Amsterdam's Schiphol Airport had not been flooded. In the Dutch version only a Fokker Friendship is destroyed on the runway.
