= Night Without End (novel) =

1959 novel by Alistair MacLean

- First edition cover (UK)
- Author: Alistair MacLean
- Language: English, Norwegian
- Genre: Thriller
- Publisher: Collins (UK); Doubleday (US)
- Publication date: 1959
- Publication place: United Kingdom
- Pages: 934 pp.
- Preceded by: The Last Frontier
- Followed by: Fear Is the Key

Night Without End is a thriller novel by Scottish author Alistair MacLean, first published in 1959. The author has been complimented for the excellent depiction of the unforgiving Arctic environment; among others, the Times Literary Supplement gave it strongly favorable notices when it came out.

== Plot summary ==
A BOAC airplane crash-lands on the Greenland ice cap far from its usual route after flying in a seemingly erratic fashion. An International Geophysical Year scientific research team based near the crash site rescues the surviving passengers and takes them to their station. Most of the flight crew are dead. The station's only means of contact with the outside world, a radio set, is destroyed in a seemingly accidental manner.

With not enough food for everyone and no hope of rescue, the leader of the scientific research team, Dr Mason, decides that they must set out for the nearest settlement, some 300 kilometers away at the coast. Meanwhile, the crew member who was found with massive brain injuries and who since has fallen into a coma is found to have been suffocated with a pillow. Inspecting the plane, Dr Mason discovers that one of the pilots had been shot in the back. The dead passenger is determined to be a military courier. An attempt is also made on Mason's life by stranding him in the arctic night; soon after that the wreck goes up in flames. The scientist's suspicion falls on the stewardess but she is soon cleared. Mason orders another scientist, Joss, to stay behind and try to repair the radio so that a field expedition can be contacted.

Mason leaves with the group along with the other scientist, Jackstraw, while remaining in touch with their station by means of a short range radio. Meanwhile, the field expedition returns to the station and contacts Mason. They inform him that a massive military mobilization has located the crashed plane and that it carried something very important. The government, having refused to divulge anything, had tried to contact Mason's station. Finding the station to be non-responding, they have requested the expedition chief, Captain Hillcrest, to investigate.

Mason decides to go on with the journey since any attempt to return will induce the murderers to act. He keeps this new development to himself and Jackstraw. Hillcrest sets out after the group but soon finds that the petrol he picked up at the station has been tampered with. Sugar has been added to the petrol disabling the engine and leading him to get bogged down. A solution is found when one of the passengers, a chemist, suggests that the petrol be mixed with water and the top layer of the resultant mixture be siphoned off. At almost the same time, the government relents and informs Mason through Hillcrest that the military courier carried a top secret missile guidance mechanism disguised as a tape recorder. Mason realizes that one of the passengers picked up such a device at the crash site. This precipitates the murderers into action and they take over the group.

Finding that killing the entire group is not possible, the criminals initially take the survivors with them, but soon abandon all of them except for the stewardess, for whom Mason has developed a romantic attachment, and the father and manager of a passenger who is a boxer. In the process, one of the passengers left behind is killed. The group stumbles on in the arctic blizzard guided by sled dogs. Soon they come across an abandoned sled that contains rocket radiosondes, which they use to guide Hillcrest to them. A chase ensues across the arctic landscape to the shore where a trawler waits for the criminals. But the intervention of the Navy, on information from Hillcrest, frightens off the trawler. The criminals are surrounded and after a bitter hand-to-hand struggle, the secret device and surviving hostages are rescued.

The first criminal is killed, however the second is still on the go. Having himself and the stewardess locked in a fast moving glacier, Dr. Mason manages to rescue her, but the killer is left to die.

== Reception ==
The New York Times called it a "bang up adventure yarn filled with realistic, well researched data." The Chicago Tribune called the book "powerful". Michael Frayn in The Guardian called it "clumsily written, absurdly implausible, thoroughly chilling."

== Proposed adaptation ==
In August 1959 film rights were bought by George Seaton and William Perlberg who had a deal with Paramount. They wanted to make the film with Debbie Reynolds with whom they had a long-term contract. They hired Eric Ambler to write a script. Lilli Palmer was announced as co star.

In 1961 Seaton said they wanted to film it after The Hook. William Holden was attached as star. In December 1961 it was announced Richard Wilson would direct at Paramount. In 1963 Wilson said he still had a commitment to make the film, and had written the script with his wife Elizabeth Vance. However the film was never made.
