= Captain Cook (book) =

1972 non-fiction book by Alistair MacLean

- Author: Alistair MacLean
- Subject: Captain Cook
- Publication date: 1972

Captain Cook is a 1972 book about Captain Cook by Alistair MacLean. It was a rare non fiction work from MacLean who wrote it out of his great admiration for Cook.

In 1976 Maclean's second wife Mary formed a company with producer Peter Snell, Aleelle Productions, who aimed to make movies based on MacLean novels including Golden Gate, Bear Island, The Way to Dusty Death and Captain Cook. No film resulted.
