= Alistair MacLean =

Scottish writer (1922–1987)

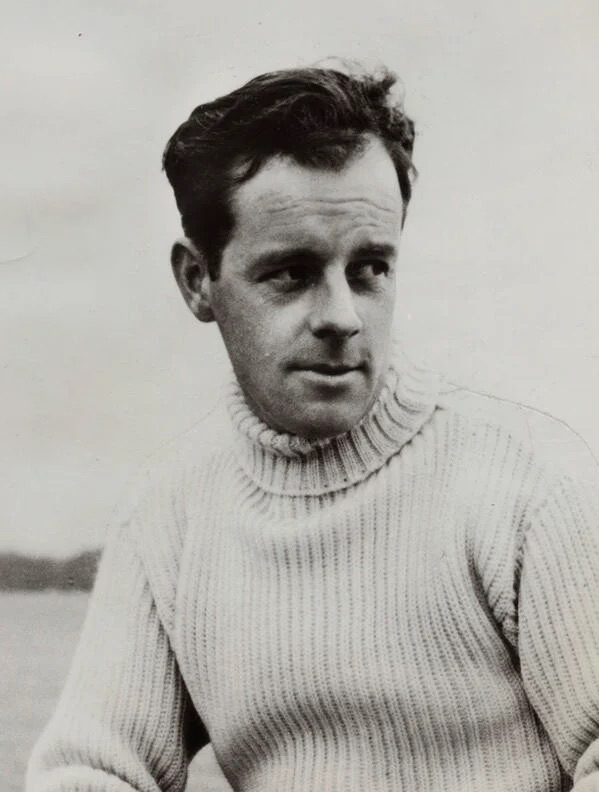
- MacLean in 1967
- Born: Alistair Stuart MacLean; 21 April 1922; Glasgow, Scotland
- Died: 2 February 1987 (aged 64); Munich, Bavaria, West Germany (present-day Germany)
- Resting place: Céligny, Switzerland
- Education: University of Glasgow
- Occupations: Author, teacher
- Spouses: Gisela Heinrichsen (m. 1953; div. 1972); Mary Marcelle Georgius (m. 1972; div. 1977)
- Children: 3
- Writing career
- Pen name: Ian Stuart
- Language: English
- Years active: 1955–1986
- Genres: Thrillers; Adventure
- Military career
- Allegiance: United Kingdom
- Branch: Royal Navy
- Service years: 1941–1946
- Rank: Leading Torpedo Operator
- Unit: PS Bournemouth Queen (1941–1943); HMS Royalist (1943–1946)
- Conflicts: World War II; Battle of the Atlantic; Mediterranean theatre; South-East Asian theatre

Alistair Stuart MacLean (Scottish Gaelic: Alasdair MacGill-Eain; 21 April 1922 – 2 February 1987) was a Scottish novelist, who wrote popular thrillers and adventure stories. His books are estimated to have sold over 150 million copies, making him one of the best-selling fiction authors of all time.

MacLean served in the Royal Navy during the Second World War, and his service aboard HMS Royalist formed the basis for his debut novel HMS Ulysses. Many of his novels have been adapted to film, most notably The Guns of Navarone (1957) and Ice Station Zebra (1963). In the late 1960s, encouraged by film producer Elliott Kastner, MacLean began to write original screenplays, concurrently with an accompanying novel. The most successful was the first of these, the 1968 film Where Eagles Dare, which was also a bestselling novel. MacLean also published two novels under the pseudonym Ian Stuart.

According to one obituary, MacLean "never lost his love for the sea, his talent for portraying good Brits against bad Germans, or his penchant for high melodrama. Critics deplored his cardboard characters and vapid females, but readers loved his combination of hot macho action, wartime commando sagas, and exotic settings that included Greek Islands and Alaskan oil fields."

== Early life ==
MacLean was born on 21 April 1922 in the Shettleston area of Glasgow, the third of four sons of Church of Scotland minister Rev. Alistair MacLean- who had been a chaplain in the Black Watch during the First World War, had written a book of essays on the role of Christianity in life, and was a book reviewer for the Glasgow Herald- and prize-winning singer Mary, daughter of warehouseman Archie Lamont, of Possilpark. He spent much of his childhood and youth in Daviot, 10 miles (16 km) south of Inverness. He spoke only Scottish Gaelic before attending school. His father died aged 51 of a cerebral haemorrhage in 1936; the family returned to Mary MacLean's hometown of Glasgow, where they lived in a tenement flat and subsisted on her not-too-generous Church of Scotland pension, supplemented by letting out two rooms to students.

In 1941, at the age of 19, MacLean was called up to fight in the Second World War with the Royal Navy, serving with the ranks of ordinary seaman, able seaman, and leading torpedoman. He was first assigned to PS Bournemouth Queen, a converted excursion ship fitted for anti-aircraft guns, on duty off the coasts of England and Scotland. Beginning in 1943, he served on HMS Royalist, a Dido-class light cruiser. There, he saw action in 1943 in the Atlantic theatre, on two Arctic convoys and escorting aircraft carrier groups in operations against Tirpitz, and other targets off the Norwegian coast. In 1944, Royalist and he served in the Mediterranean theatre, as part of the invasion of southern France and in helping to sink blockade runners off Crete and bombard Milos in the Aegean. During this time, MacLean may have been injured in a gunnery-practice accident. In 1945, in the Far East theatre, MacLean and Royalist saw action escorting carrier groups in operations against Japanese targets in Burma, Malaya, and Sumatra. (MacLean's late-in-life claims that he was captured by the Japanese after blowing up bridges, and tortured by having his teeth pulled out, have been dismissed by both his son and his biographer as drunken ravings). After the Japanese surrender, Royalist helped evacuate liberated POWs from Changi Prison in Singapore.

MacLean was discharged from the Royal Navy in 1946. He then studied English at the University of Glasgow, working at the post office and as a street sweeper. He lived with his mother at 26 Carrington Street, St George's Cross, Glasgow while attending the university. He graduated with an MA (Hons.) in 1950, briefly worked as a hospital porter, and then worked as a schoolteacher at Gallowflat School (now Stonelaw High School) in Rutherglen.

== Early writing career ==
=== First works ===
While a university student, MacLean began writing short stories for extra income, winning a competition in 1954 with the maritime story "Dileas". He sold stories to the Daily Mirror and The Evening News. The wife of Ian Chapman, editor at the publishing company Collins, had been particularly moved by "Dileas" and the Chapmans arranged to meet with MacLean, suggesting he write a novel. MacLean responded three months later with HMS Ulysses, based on his own war experiences and credited insight from his brother Ian, a master mariner.

MacLean later described his writing process:

I drew a cross square, lines down representing the characters, lines across representing chapters 1–15. Most of the characters died, in fact only one survived the book, but when I came to the end the graph looked somewhat lopsided, there were too many people dying in the first, fifth and tenth chapters so I had to rewrite it, giving an even dying space throughout. I suppose it sounds cold blooded and calculated, but that's the way I did it.

MacLean was paid a large advance of $50,000, which made the headlines. Collins were rewarded when the book sold a quarter of a million copies in hardback in the UK in the first six months of publication. It went on to sell millions more. Film rights were sold to Robert Clark of Associated British for £30,000, though a film was never made. This money meant MacLean was able to devote himself to writing full-time.

=== Guns of Navarone ===
His next novel, The Guns of Navarone (1957), was about an attack on the fictitious island of Navarone (based on Milos). The book was very successful, selling over 400,000 copies in its first six months. In 1957, MacLean said, "I'm not a literary person. If someone offered me £100,000 tax free, I'd never write another word." The film version of The Guns of Navarone (1961) was hugely successful.

MacLean was unhappy at the tax paid on earnings for his first two novels, so he moved to Lake Lucerne in Switzerland, where he would pay less tax. He planned to write one novel a year. "It's all the market can stand," he said, adding it took him three months to write it.

MacLean followed it with South by Java Head (1958), based on his experiences in the seas off Southeast Asia in World War Two. Film rights for South by Java Head were sold, but no movie resulted.

The Last Frontier (1959), was a thriller about the Hungarian uprising of 1956. The Last Frontier was turned into a movie, The Secret Ways (1961), which was not very successful.

His next novels were Night Without End (1959) and Fear Is the Key (1961).

=== Ian Stuart ===
In the early 1960s, MacLean published two novels under the pseudonym "Ian Stuart" to prove that the popularity of his books was due to their content rather than his name on the cover. These were The Dark Crusader (1961) and The Satan Bug (1962). He also said it was because "I usually write adventure stories, but this is a sort of Secret Service or private eye book. I didn't want to confuse my readers."

The Ian Stuart books sold well, and MacLean made no attempt to change his writing style. He also continued to publish novels under his own name such as The Golden Rendezvous (1962) and Ice Station Zebra (1963).

"I'm not a novelist," he once said. "That's too pretentious a claim. I'm a storyteller, that's all. I'm a professional and a craftsman. I will make that claim for myself." MacLean also claimed he wrote very fast (35 days for a novel) because he disliked writing and the "sooner he finished, the better." He never reread a book after it was finished. His novels were notable for their lack of sex. "I like girls", he said. "I just don't write them well. Everyone knows that men and women make love, laddie – there is no need to show it."

=== Retirement ===
In 1963, MacLean decided to retire from writing, saying he never enjoyed it and only did it to make money. He decided to become a hotelier and bought the Jamaica Inn on Bodmin Moor and then bought two more hotels, the Bank House near Worcester and the Beam Bridge at Wellington in Somerset. MacLean focused on his hotel career for three years. It was not a success, and by 1976, he had sold all three hotels. During this time, a film was made of The Satan Bug.

== Return to writing ==
=== Screenwriter ===
MacLean returned to writing with When Eight Bells Toll (1966).

Cinema producer Elliot Kastner admired MacLean, and asked him if he would be interested in writing an original screenplay. MacLean agreed to the proposition, and Kastner sent the writer two scripts, one by William Goldman and one by Robert and Jane Howard-Carrington, to familiarize himself with the format. Kastner said he wanted a World War Two story with a group of men on a mission to rescue someone, with a "ticking clock" and some female characters. MacLean agreed to write it for an initial $10,000 with $100,000 to come later. This script was Where Eagles Dare.

In July 1966, Kastner and his producing partner Jerry Gershwin announced they had purchased five screenplays from MacLean: Where Eagles Dare, When Eight Bells Toll, and three other unnamed ones. (Kastner made four MacLean movies.) MacLean also wrote a novel for Where Eagles Dare, after the screenplay, which was published in 1967 before the film came out. The book was a bestseller, and the 1968 film version was a huge hit.

"MacLean is a natural storyteller", said Kastner. "He is a master of adventure. All his books are conceived in cinematic terms. They hardly need to be adapted for the screen; when you read them, the screen is in front of your mind." MacLean wrote a sequel to Guns of Navarone, Force 10 from Navarone (1968). A film version was announced in 1967, but did not result for another decade. The same year, an expensive film based on Ice Station Zebra was released.

=== Producer ===
In 1967, MacLean formed a partnership with Geoffrey Reeve and Lewis Jenkins to make films for MacLean to write and Reeves to direct. They planned to make a sequel to Guns of Navarone, only to discover that Carl Foreman, producer of the original film, had registered the title After Navarone. This led to a falling-out with Foreman, and a delay in the Navarone sequel.

Maclean wrote a thriller about narcotics, Puppet on a Chain (1969), and Caravan to Vaccarès (1970). These books all began as screenplays for Kastner. Maclean said Puppet was "a change of style from the earlier books. If I went on writing the same stuff, I'd be guying myself."

When Puppet on a Chain was made, Maclean said, "I've been connected with it for three years and it's too much for me. All those entrepreneurs and promoters who aren't creative. All that time wasted."

"There is nobody to touch him," said Ian Chapman. "But he is a storyteller, not a film man."

MacLean then wrote Bear Island (1971), the last of his first-person narratives.

MacLean moved to Switzerland in 1970 as a tax exile. That year, he said, "there's Harold Robbins, Agatha Christie, Georges Simenon, and me." He added, "I'm a storyteller, that's all. There's no art in it, no mystique. It's a job like any other. The secret, if there is one, is speed. That's why there's so little sex in my books – it holds up the action." He said he enjoyed the plotting "but the rest is a pain."

In 1970 MacLean, whose hero was Raymond Chandler, said "give me ten years, a few more books, and maybe, maybe I'll be half as good as Chandler."

Kastner produced a film version of When Eight Bells Toll (1971), based on a script by MacLean, and Fear Is the Key (1972), adapted by another writer. Another producer made Puppet on a Chain (1971), directed by Reeves, from a script by MacLean. Neither performed particularly strongly at the box office.

=== Mary MacLean ===
In 1972, MacLean married his second wife, Mary Georgius. She planned to produce three films based on his books, but the box-office failure of the last three MacLean adaptations put these on hold. One of these proposed films was The Way to Dusty Death, which was to star Jackie Stewart. It ended up being a 1973 novel and a 1995 film.

In 1973, MacLean was looking at moving to Jamaica. He also considered moving to Ireland, but decided to stay in Switzerland.

Geoffrey Reeve directed a film of Caravan to Vaccarès (1974). By 1973, MacLean had sold over 24 million novels. "I am not a writer," he said in 1972. "I am a businessman. My business is writing." MacLean had spent a number of years focusing on screenplays, but disliked it and decided to return to being predominantly a novel writer. "Hollywood destroys writers," he said. He wrote a biography of Captain James Cook, which was published in 1972. He wrote Breakheart Pass (1974), Circus (1975), The Golden Gate (1976), Seawitch (1977), Goodbye California (1979) and Athabasca (1980).

"I read a lot, I travel some," he said in 1975. "But mostly what I don't know, I invent." In 1976, he was living in Los Angeles and said he wanted to write a four-volume serious piece called "The Rembrandt Quarter" based on the painting The Night Watch. These books were never published.

In 1977, it was announced MacLean, then worth £5 million, would divorce Mary, who said the author was impossible to live with.

In 1978, MacLean said he "just can't understand" why people bought his novels. "It's not as if I write that well: I do feel my English isn't very good. In fact, I'd rather write in Gaelic or Spanish than English."

He said his stories tended to pit "character against character as a kind of intellectual chess game" and that he found writing "boring" and "lonely", but "I guess it all boils down to that rather awful philosophy of take the money and run." "I am just a journeyman," he said. "I blunder along from one book to the next always hopeful that one day I will write something really good."

Films were still being made out of his novels, including Breakheart Pass (1975) (from Kastner), Golden Rendezvous (1977), Force 10 from Navarone (1978), and Bear Island (1979), but none did very well.

In 1976, MacLean's second wife Mary formed a company with producer Peter Snell, Aleelle Productions, which aimed to make movies based on MacLean novels, including Golden Gate, Bear Island, The Way to Dusty Death, and Captain Cook. This company still owned these film rights after MacLean divorced Mary in 1977, but the rights soon passed to Snell.

MacLean decided to focus on American television, writing a novella titled Air Force One is Down, which was turned down by the American television network NBC (it would be produced in 2012). He then pitched six new ideas to networks, each with a 25– to 30-page synopsis to see which was commercially viable before The Hostage Tower was approved by CBS, and aired on American television in 1980.

=== Later career ===
His later works include River of Death (1981) (filmed in 1989), Partisans (1982), Floodgate (1983), and San Andreas (1984). Often, these novels were worked on by ghost writers specializing in drama, with MacLean providing only the plots and characters. His last novel was Santorini (1986), which was published after his death. His estate left behind several outlines. One of them was filmed as Death Train (1993). His later books were not as well received as the earlier publications, and in an attempt to keep his stories in keeping with the time, he sometimes lapsed into unduly improbable plots.

== Death ==
MacLean died of heart failure at the age of 64 in Munich on 2 February 1987; his last years were affected by alcoholism. According to one obituary, "A master of nail-chewing suspense, MacLean met an appropriately mysterious death; when he died in the Bavarian capital after a brief illness, no one, including the British Embassy, knew what he was doing there." He is buried in the Old Cemetery ("Vieux Cimetière") of Céligny, Switzerland, close to the grave of his friend Richard Burton.

== Personal life ==
He was married twice and had three sons (one adopted) by his first wife, Gisela. The sons were Lachlan, Michael and Alistair. He married for a second time in 1972 to Mary Marcelle, a writer and publicist; that marriage ended in divorce in 1977. His niece Shona MacLean (also published under S.G. Maclean) is a writer and historical novelist.

MacLean was awarded a doctor of letters by the University of Glasgow in 1983.

== Critical appraisal ==
Writer Algis Budrys described MacLean's writing style as - "hit 'em with everything but the kitchen sink, then give 'em the sink, and when they raise their heads, drop the plumber on 'em".

Screenwriter Derek Kolstad, who wrote the John Wick film series, cited MacLean and Stephen King as among his primary influences.

== List of works ==
=== Novels ===
Rankings according to New York Times
| Year | Title | Notes | Highest position reached | Number of weeks on list |
|---|---|---|---|---|
| 1955 | HMS Ulysses | | #8 | 17 |
| 1957 | The Guns of Navarone | | #12 | 3 |
| 1958 | South by Java Head | | — | — |
| 1959 | The Last Frontier | in the US The Secret Ways | — | — |
| 1959 | Night Without End | | #13 | 2 |
| 1961 | Fear Is the Key | | — | — |
| 1961 | The Dark Crusader | in the US The Black Shrike (as Ian Stuart) | — | — |
| 1962 | The Golden Rendezvous | | #13 | 8 |
| 1962 | The Satan Bug | as Ian Stuart | #16 | 1 |
| 1962 | All About Lawrence of Arabia | Non-fiction | | |
| 1963 | Ice Station Zebra | | #10 | 1 |
| 1966 | When Eight Bells Toll | Also wrote screenplay. | — | — |
| 1967 | Where Eagles Dare | Wrote screenplay and novelization simultaneously | - | - |
| 1968 | Force 10 From Navarone | | #4 | 18 |
| 1969 | Puppet on a Chain | Also wrote screenplay | #5 | 17 |
| 1970 | Caravan to Vaccarès | | #6 | 12 |
| 1971 | Bear Island | | #5 | 14 |
| 1972 | Alistair MacLean Introduces Scotland | Non-fiction, edited by Alastair Dunnett | | |
| 1972 | Captain Cook | Non-fiction | | |
| 1973 | The Way to Dusty Death | | — | — |
| 1974 | Breakheart Pass | | — | — |
| 1975 | Circus | | #5 | 12 |
| 1976 | The Golden Gate | | #8 | 2 |
| 1977 | Seawitch | | #15 | 1 |
| 1978 | Goodbye California | | #10 | 9 |
| 1980 | Athabasca | | #3 | — |
| 1981 | River of Death | | — | — |
| 1982 | Partisans | | #15 | 1 |
| 1983 | Floodgate | | #12 | 3 |
| 1984 | San Andreas | | — | — |
| 1985 | The Lonely Sea | Collection of short stories (2 stories added in 2009) | — | — |
| 1986 | Santorini | | #13 | 2 |

Source for The New York Times Best Seller list: "Adult New York Times Best Seller Listings". Hawes Publications. Figures are for the Adult Hardcover Fiction lists, 1956 through 1987: highest position reached and total number of weeks on list. A "—" indicates it did not make the list. Note that the Times list consisted of a Top 10 from 1963 through 1976, but a Top 15 or 16 before and after; thus, books during that middle period may have had longer stays relative to the others.

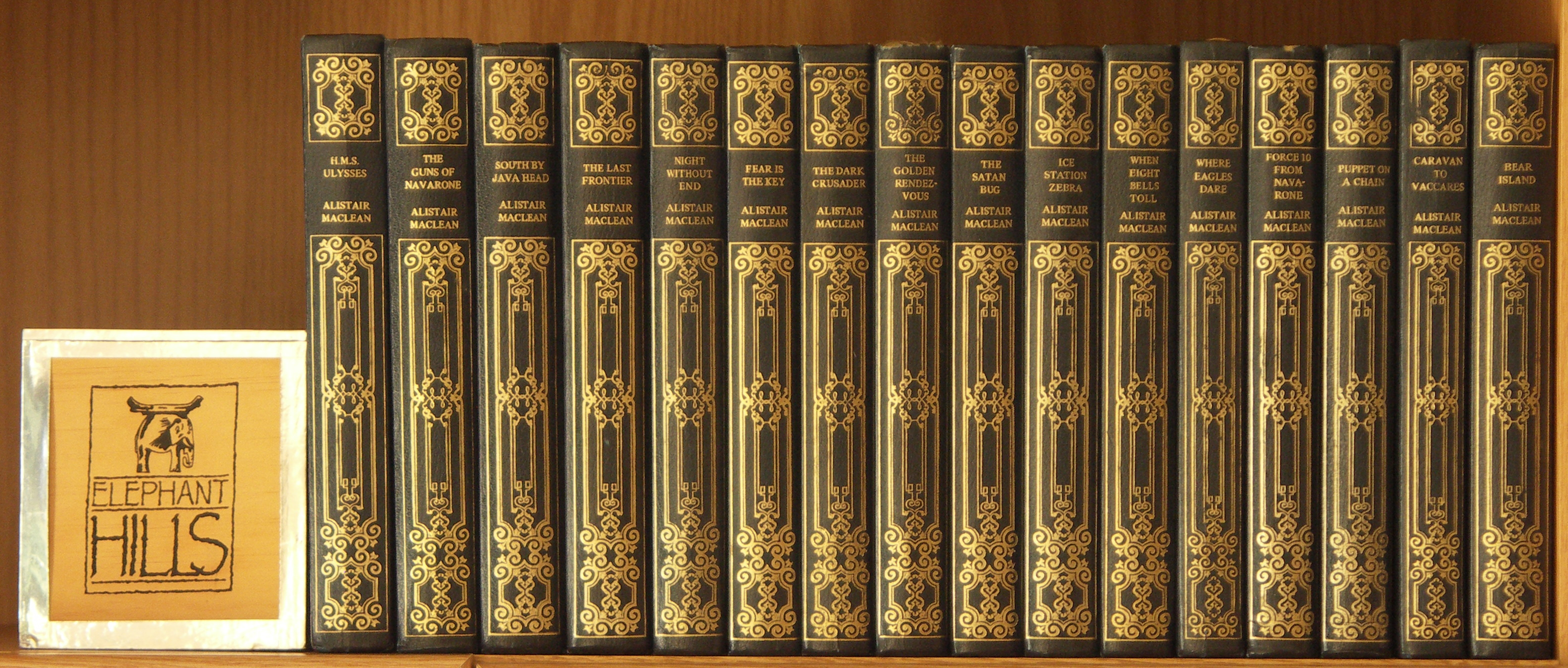
A collection of MacLean's fiction works from 1955 to 1971, published by Heron Books (London) in the mid-1970s

=== UNACO books by other authors ===
| Year | Title | Author, using MacLean's notes |
|---|---|---|
| 1980 | Hostage Tower | John Denis |
| 1981 | Air Force One is Down | John Denis |
| 1989 | Death Train | Alastair MacNeill |
| 1989 | Night Watch | Alastair MacNeill |
| 1990 | Red Alert | Alastair MacNeill |
| 1991 | Time of the Assassins | Alastair MacNeill |
| 1992 | Dead Halt | Alastair MacNeill |
| 1993 | Code Breaker | Alastair MacNeill |
| 1995 | Rendezvous | Alastair MacNeill |
| 1997 | Prime Target | Hugh Miller |
| 1998 | Borrowed Time | Hugh Miller |

=== Golden Girl series by other authors ===
| Year | Title | Notes |
|---|---|---|
| 1992 | Golden Girl | by Simon Gandolfi |
| 1993 | Golden Web | by Simon Gandolfi |
| 1994 | Golden Vengeance | by Simon Gandolfi |

=== Films with screenplay contribution ===
| Year | Title | Notes |
|---|---|---|
| 1968 | Where Eagles Dare | book author/screenplay |
| 1970 | Puppet on a Chain | book author/screenplay |
| 1971 | When Eight Bells Toll | book author/screenplay |
| 1975 | Breakheart Pass | book author/screenplay |
| 2012 | Air Force One Is Down | story |

=== Other films ===
| Year | Title | Notes |
|---|---|---|
| 1961 | The Secret Ways | book author |
| 1961 | The Guns of Navarone | book author |
| 1965 | The Satan Bug | book author |
| 1968 | Ice Station Zebra | book author |
| 1972 | Fear Is the Key | book author |
| 1974 | Caravan to Vaccares | book author |
| 1977 | Golden Rendezvous | book author |
| 1978 | Force 10 from Navarone | book author |
| 1979 | Bear Island | book author |
| 1980 | The Hostage Tower | story |
| 1989 | River of Death | book author |
| 1993 | Death Train | story |
| 1995 | The Way to Dusty Death | book author |
| 1995 | Night Watch | story |

== See also ==
- Hammond Innes
