= The Dark Crusader =

1961 novel by Alistair MacLean

- First edition cover (UK)
- Author: Alistair MacLean
- Language: English
- Genre: Thriller Spy novel Novel
- Publisher: Collins (UK); Scribner (US)
- Publication date: 1961
- Publication place: United Kingdom
- Pages: 223
- Preceded by: Fear Is the Key
- Followed by: The Golden Rendezvous

The Dark Crusader is a 1961 thriller novel by Scottish author Alistair MacLean. The book was initially published under the pseudonym Ian Stuart and later under his true name. It was released in the United States under the title: The Black Shrike.

MacLean wrote it in part to prove he could have success writing under a new name.

== Plot ==
Eight top-level scientists and their wives disappear after responding to newspaper advertisements for specialists in different areas of modern technology, so when a ninth advertisement appears, Agent John Bentall is recalled to London from a mission in Turkey by his superior, Colonel Raine. The advertisements offered high rates of pay to applicants who were married, had no children and were prepared for immediate travel. Bentall, a physicist who specialized in solid rocket fuels and is presently working for the British government on counter espionage, is paired with Marie Hopeman, a secret agent posted in the same job as Bentall in Turkey, assigned to pose as his wife. All eight couples had disappeared in Australia or en route there, and Bentall and Hopeman are themselves kidnapped at a hotel in Fiji. They escape from the kidnappers' schooner to the island of Vardu, a remote extinct volcanic island with a barrier reef in the middle of the Pacific Ocean, which is currently home to Professor Witherspoon, a noted archaeologist, whom Bentall finds somewhat sketchy. The island has no radio transmitter and the next boat is scheduled to arrive in three weeks. Bentall discovers that Witherspoon is actually LeClerc, the ruthless mastermind behind a plot to steal a British experimental missile, the Dark Crusader, from a secret Royal Navy base on the other side of the island and send it to somewhere in East Asia for nefarious purposes.

Bentall's character displays a stumbling, self-deprecating demeanour and makes mistakes that lead to the pair falling into the trap set by the villains. The story becomes more complicated when Bentall and Hopeman find themselves falling in love as they try to defeat LeClerc. Neither the female secret agent nor the situation are quite as they seem. Bentall cleverly struggles to save Hopeman and prevent the theft of the missile, and finally unravels the last details of the situation with his boss, Colonel Raine back in London.

== Reception ==
The book did not sell as well as earlier MacLean titles and was later reissued under MacLean's name. Film rights were bought by Simon Lewis in 1991 but no movie resulted.

== See also ==
Rainbow Codes, the British military weapon codes that were the basis of both titles
