= The Secret Ways =

1961 film by Richard Widmark, Phil Karlson

- Original film poster
- Directed by: Phil Karlson; Richard Widmark (uncredited)
- Written by: Jean Hazelwood
- Based on: The Last Frontier; 1959 novel by Alistair MacLean
- Produced by: Richard Widmark; Euan Lloyd
- Starring: Richard Widmark; Sonja Ziemann
- Cinematography: Max Greene
- Edited by: Aaron Stell
- Music by: John Williams
- Color process: Black and white
- Production company: Heath Productions
- Distributed by: Universal Pictures
- Release date: April 1961
- Running time: 112 minutes
- Country: United States
- Language: English

The Secret Ways is a 1961 American neo noir mystery thriller film based on Alistair MacLean's 1959 novel The Last Frontier. It was directed by Phil Karlson and stars Richard Widmark.

== Plot ==
In 1960 Vienna, after Soviet tanks crush the Hungarian Revolution of 1956, American adventurer Michael Reynolds (Richard Widmark) is hired by an international espionage ring to smuggle a noted scholar and resistance leader, Professor Jansci (Walter Rilla), out of Communist-ruled Hungary. Reynolds goes to Vienna to see the professor's daughter, Julia (Sonja Ziemann), and he persuades her to accompany him to Budapest. Once there, Reynolds is kidnapped by "freedom fighters" who take him to the professor's secret headquarters.

Meanwhile, one of Jansci's trusted aides is captured by the Hungarian Secret Police and forced to reveal the professor's hiding place. Reynolds, Julia, and Jansci are quickly rounded up and taken to Szarhaza Prison, where they are tortured by the sadistic Colonel Hidas (Howard Vernon).

They are rescued by a resistance fighter known as The Count (Charles Régnier), who tricks the Communists into placing the prisoners in his custody. At the last moment the ruse is discovered. The Count is killed as the other three race to the airport where a chartered plane is waiting. Hidas pursues them but is killed in an accident on the runway. Safe at last, Reynolds, Julia, and the professor leave Hungary.

== Cast ==
- Richard Widmark as Michael Reynolds
- Sonja Ziemann as Julia
- Charles Régnier as The Count
- Walter Rilla as Jancsi
- Senta Berger as Elsa
- Howard Vernon as Colonel Hidas
- Heinz Moog as Minister Sakenov
- Hubert von Meyerinck as Sheffler
- Oskar Wegrostek as The Fat man
- Stefan Schnabel as Border official
- Elisabeth Neumann-Viertel as Olga
- Helmut Janatsch as Janos
- John Horsley as Jon Brainbridge
- Walter Wilz as Peter
- Raoul Retzer as Special Agent
- Georg Köváry as Language Professor
- Ady Berber as Sandor
- Jochen Brockmann as The Commandant
- Brigitte Brunmüller as Waitress
- Reinhard Kolldehoff as The Count's Men
- Rudolf Rösner as The Count's Men

== Production ==
The film was based on Alistair MacLean's novel The Last Frontier which was published in the US as The Secret Ways.

Actor Richard Widmark moved into producing in the 1950s while making Time Limit. His production company, Heath Films, bought the screen rights in March 1959. Widmark called it "an anti-Communist thing" which "had nothing to do with my [personal] politics."

In August 1959 Heath Films signed a two-picture deal with Universal, the first of which was to be The Secret Ways. Other books Widmark wanted to film were The Wounds of Hunger and The Seven File.

Widmark visited Austria with his wife Jean Hazlewood, who would write the script. They did considerable research and made a significant number of changes to the novel.

In May 1960 Phil Karlson signed to direct. Karlson went to Vienna on June 1, and filming began in August. Many local Austrian actors were cast in support roles.

=== Shooting ===
According to an interview in Cinema Retro, associate producer Euan Lloyd stated that producer and star Richard Widmark did not like director Phil Karlson's proposed tongue-in-cheek direction of the screenplay written by Widmark's wife Jean Hazlewood. Widmark took over the direction of the film in September without credit.

Karlson says Widmark hired him on the basis of The Phenix City Story because "he wanted to try to get realism in it" and the director told him "I wanted to do it as a James Bond. But he hadn't heard of James Bond. I said, "If we do this tongue in cheek, we'll be the first ones." He said, "No, I don't want to do it that way"." Karlson says he left for the last week of filming. Years later, after Karlson made The Silencers, a Bond-style spoof, he says Widmark tried to get him to do three more pictures. The director said, "He realized we'd have had, maybe, the first picture that would have taken him out of the role of the guy who kicks the old lady down the steps."

Widmark had a series of movies in development as a proposed follow-up.
