= San Andreas (novel) =

1984 novel by Alistair MacLean

- First edition (UK)
- Author: Alistair MacLean
- Language: English
- Subject: Naval warfare
- Publisher: Collins (UK); Doubleday (US)
- Publication date: 1984
- Publication place: United Kingdom
- Media type: Hardcover Print
- Pages: 306 pp.
- ISBN: 0-385-23152-0
- OCLC: 11784511
- Dewey Decimal: 823/.914 19
- LC Class: PR6063.A248 S2 1985
- Preceded by: Floodgate
- Followed by: Santorini

San Andreas is a novel by Scottish author Alistair MacLean, first published in 1984. One of his final novels, it returns to MacLean's original (and most successful) genre, naval warfare.

== Synopsis ==
The British Merchant Navy hospital ship San Andreas is en route from Murmansk to Halifax, Nova Scotia during World War II. With large red crosses painted on the sides of its hull, San Andreas should have immunity from attack from all sides in the war and be granted safe passage. The first sign of trouble occurs when the ship's lights mysteriously fail just before a pre-dawn bombing attack that severely damages its superstructure and sinks its escort frigate. With most of the senior officers dead and the captain incapacitated, bosun Archie McKinnon must take charge of the damaged ship and steer her to safety despite German aircraft, u-boats, stormy Arctic weather and sabotage by an unknown traitor on board. He must also discover the reason for the repeated German attempts to capture the San Andreas.

== Release ==
San Andreas was first published in 1984 through Collins in the United Kingdom and in the following year, was also published in Australia and the United States. It has since been translated into multiple languages that include Italian, Russian, and Portuguese.

== Reception and reviews ==
Critical reception was generally positive. The Los Angeles Times said "This is MacLean at his unholy best, ripping our nerves, combining tragedy with dread as we race on, armchair victims of an overdose of shock. " Jane Briggs-Bunting of the Detroit Free Press praised the work, calling it "top-flight reading".

Billy Turner of the Jackson Daily News was somewhat critical, writing "This work is up to most of his standards. But just once one wishes he would try to do more. One feels he could."

The book was a best seller.

== TV adaptation ==
In 2016 Deadline reported that London-based Dancing Ledge Productions had acquired the rights to adapt MacLean's works into an event TV series, the first of which would be San Andreas. Each series would be made up of four to six episodes.
