= Tanjung Layar =

Cape at the west of Java, at the entrance to the Sunda Strait

Coordinates: 6°45′15″S 105°13′10″E

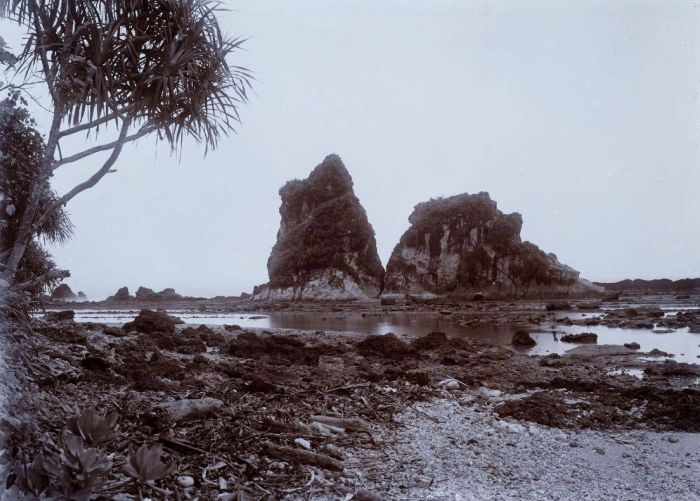
Tanjung Layar in the 1920s, and the rock with a shape like a tanja sail

Tanjung Layar, formerly Java's Eerste Punt in Dutch, and Java's First Point or Java Head in English, is a prominent cape at the extreme western end of Java, at the Indian Ocean entrance to the Sunda Strait. Java Head is a bluff at the sea's edge with higher land beyond, visible from a significant distance at sea, with deep water close to the shore. Its name means "sail cape" because of the shape of a rock close to its shore. Cape Gede, the westernmost point of Java, is located in its southwestern part.

== In Literature ==
The narrator, Ishmael, in Herman Melville's Moby-Dick refers to "Java head" at the beginning of Chapter 87. The Grand Armada, in the following description:

"Those narrow straits of Sunda divide Sumatra from Java; and standing midway in that vast rampart of islands, buttressed by that bold green promontory, known to seamen as Java Head; they not a little correspond to the central gateway opening into some vast walled empire: and considering the inexhaustible wealth of spices, and silks, and jewels, and gold, and ivory, with which the thousand islands of that oriental sea are enriched, it seems a significant provision of nature, that such treasures, by the very formation of the land, should at least bear the appearance, however ineffectual, of being guarded from the all-grasping western world. The shores of the Straits of Sunda are unsupplied with those domineering fortresses which guard the entrances to the Mediterranean, the Baltic, and the Propontis. Unlike the Danes, these Orientals do not demand the obsequious homage of lowered top-sails from the endless procession of ships before the wind, which for centuries past, by night and by day, have passed between the islands of Sumatra and Java, freighted with the costliest cargoes of the east. But while they freely waive a ceremonial like this, they do by no means renounce their claim to more solid tribute."

== See also ==
- Java Head (1919 novel by Joseph Hergesheimer)
- Java Head (1923 film)
- Java Head (1934 film)
- South by Java Head (1958 novel by Alistair MacLean)
