= Partisans (novel) =

1982 novel by Alistair MacLean

- First edition cover (UK)
- Author: Alistair MacLean
- Language: English
- Genre: War novel
- Publisher: Collins (UK); Doubleday (US)
- Publication date: 1982
- Publication place: United Kingdom
- Media type: Print
- Pages: 224
- ISBN: 0-00-222690-1
- Preceded by: River of Death
- Followed by: Floodgate

Partisans is a novel by the Scottish author Alistair MacLean, first published in 1982. MacLean used portions of the plot from the 1978 film Force 10 from Navarone as the basis of the plot for this novel. MacLean reverted to the theme of the Second World War, with which he was successful and highly popular in his early career.

== Plot introduction ==
During the Second World War, Pete Petersen, a Yugoslavian agent with an unlikely name, and his team of compatriots cross war-torn Yugoslavia to deliver a secret message and unmask a double agent.

It is not clear who Petersen is actually working for, as the plot meanders through the confusion of Yugoslavia's three-way civil war, with Communist Partisans, the Serb royalist Chetniks and the Croatian fascist Ustashe fighting as much against each other as against their Italian and German occupiers. Everyone's loyalties are uncertain. Obviously, the sardonic Petersen is not working for the Nazis, but what about those with him?

== Reception ==
The New York Times said in the book Maclean "gives World War II the full [G.A.] Henty treatment: stilted writing about cardboard characters engaged in a desperate enterprise.". The book became a best seller.
