= Bear Island (novel) =

1971 novel by Alistair MacLean

- First edition cover (UK)
- Author: Alistair MacLean
- Language: English
- Genre: Thriller novel
- Publisher: Collins (UK); Doubleday (US)
- Publication date: 1971
- Publication place: United Kingdom
- Preceded by: Caravan to Vaccarès
- Followed by: Alistair MacLean Introduces Scotland (non-fiction)

Bear Island is a thriller novel by Scottish author Alistair MacLean. Originally published in 1971 with a cover by Norman Weaver, it was the last of MacLean's novels to be written in first-person narrative. This novel is a murder mystery with the added twist that the scene of the crimes is Bear Island, an island in the Svalbard archipelago of the Norwegian Arctic.

== Plot summary ==
A converted fishing trawler, Morning Rose carries a movie-making crew across the Barents Sea to isolated Bear Island, well above the Arctic Circle, for some on-location filming, but the script is a secret known only to the producer and screenwriter. En route, members of the movie crew and ship's company begin to die under mysterious circumstances. The crew's doctor, Marlowe, finds himself enmeshed in a violent, multi-layered plot in which very few of the persons aboard are who they claim to be. Marlowe's efforts to unravel the plot become even more complicated once the movie crew is deposited ashore on Bear Island, beyond the reach of the law or outside help. The murders continue ashore, and Marlowe, who is not what he seems to be either, discovers they may be related to some forgotten events of the Second World War.

== Reception ==
The Observer called it "highly impossible, highly readable." The Los Angeles Times called it "the best adventure MacLean has written for some time. It will make a whopping good movie."

== Film, TV or theatrical adaptations ==
The novel sold over 8 million copies. Bear Island was adapted to film in the 1979 movie directed by Don Sharp and starred Donald Sutherland, Richard Widmark, Vanessa Redgrave, and Christopher Lee. The film was shot in Canada and Alaska, and the scenery bears little resemblance to Bear Island. Furthermore, the plot and characterization of the novel were greatly altered by the scriptwriters, to the point of changing the name of the protagonist from "Marlowe" to "Lansing".
