= Bear Island (film) =

1979 British film by Don Sharp

- Cinema poster
- Directed by: Don Sharp
- Written by: Don Sharp; David Butler additional material Murray Smith
- Based on: novel Bear Island by Alistair MacLean
- Produced by: Peter Snell; William Hill
- Starring: Donald Sutherland; Vanessa Redgrave; Richard Widmark; Christopher Lee; Barbara Parkins; Lloyd Bridges
- Cinematography: Alan Hume
- Edited by: Tony Lower
- Music by: Robert Farnon
- Production companies: Selkirk Films; Canadian Film Development Corporation; Bear Island Films
- Distributed by: United Artists (Canada); Columbia Pictures (International; through Columbia-EMI-Warner Distributors in the UK)
- Release dates: 1 November 1979 (United States); 5 December 1979 (South Africa); 26 December 1979 (UK)
- Running time: 118 minutes
- Countries: United Kingdom; Canada
- Languages: English, German
- Budget: $CAD12,100,000 (estimated) or $9.3 million

Bear Island is a 1979 adventure film based on Alistair MacLean's 1971 novel of the same name. It was directed by Don Sharp, and starring Donald Sutherland, Vanessa Redgrave, Richard Widmark, Christopher Lee, Barbara Parkins and Lloyd Bridges.

== Plot ==
A solitary figure, Larsen, hurries across an arctic landscape to his tent and sends an emergency radio signal, trying to contact colleagues on the ship 'Morning Rose', but he is killed before he can transmit any useful information.

The 'Morning Rose' is carrying a multinational expedition of United Nations scientists to remote Bear Island to study climate change. Leading the team are German scientists Gerran and his deputy Hartman, and includes Norwegian psychiatrist Lindquist and the laconic Pole Lechinski. American biologist Frank Lansing joins the boat, where he is reunited with his friend Smithy and former colleague Rubin. Lansing's suspicions are aroused when his belongings are searched shortly after his arrival.

The expedition arrives at Bear Island, location of a NATO base and the site of a former U-boat station. From German colleagues Jungbeck and Heyter, they learn that Larsen is missing. Gerran forbids access to the old U-boat base, but it becomes apparent that Lansing is very interested in it – his father was a U-boat commander who died there.

Lansing and Rubin disobey instructions and venture into the area near the U-boat base but someone triggers an avalanche using explosive charges, killing Rubin. Later, Lansing finds an underwater entrance to the U-boat base, where he finds his father's submarine with his remains still inside it. He also finds signs that others have visited the base recently, and suspects Jungbeck and Heyter.

Lansing and Smithy decide to go to the NATO base for help, and although their snowmobile is sabotaged they both survive the explosion. Meanwhile, Lindquist finds a message left by Larsen, who had been a Norwegian agent, confirming that Jungbeck and Heyter are neo-Nazis controlled by a third expedition member codenamed Zelda. Lansing takes Lindquist to the U-boat where they find crates marked as containing explosives, but on opening one they discover it is full of gold.

Back at the base, there are more suspicious incidents: the radio mast collapses, fatally wounding Lechinski, and an explosion destroys the electrical generator, apparently killing Smithy. Lansing fingers Jungbeck and Heyter, who are arrested and locked up. The next morning, Lansing and Lindquist head out from the base, but are followed by Jungbeck and Heyter who have been released by Zelda. While lying in wait for his pursuers, Lansing realises that Hartman has given him an unloaded rifle and that he must be the mysterious Zelda. Jungbeck and Heyter track them down, but are killed by Lansing.

Lansing returns to the U-boat and finds that the gold has been removed. He meets Smithy, who is alive after all, and wants the gold for himself. Hartman waits to leave with the research boat and the gold, unaware that his henchmen are dead. A repentant Gerran, cleared of being a Nazi supporter, but ashamed of not having done more to oppose them, wants to return the gold to Norway as an act of contrition, and confronts Hartman at the harbour, but is shot and disabled.

Smithy disarms Hartman and takes him onto the boat, while Lansing sets off in pursuit. Smithy is jumped by Hartman and killed, but Lansing reaches and boards the boat and kills Hartman.

The SS logbook recovered by Lansing reveals that his father had refused to hand over the gold to the SS in 1945, and had been executed along with his crew. At the burial of his father, Smithy and Lechinski, Lansing achieves some form of closure and embraces Lindquist.

== Cast ==
- Donald Sutherland as Frank Lansing
- Vanessa Redgrave as Heddi Lindquist
- Richard Widmark as Otto Gerran
- Christopher Lee as Lechinski
- Barbara Parkins as Judith Rubin
- Lloyd Bridges as Smithy
- Bruce Greenwood as Technician Tommy
- Patricia Collins as Inge Van Zipper
- Mark Jones as the Cook
- August Schellenberg as the italian Marine Technician
- Candace O'Connor as the Laboratory Assistant
- Michael Collins as the Ship's Captain
- Michael J. Reynolds as Heyter
- Lawrence Dane as Paul Hartman
- Nicholas Cortland as Jungbeck
- Joseph Golland as the Meteorological Assistant
- Richard Wren as the Radio Operator
- Hagan Beggs as Larsen
- Robert Stelmach as the Ship's Radio Operator
- Terry Waterhouse as the Helicopter Crewman

== Production ==
=== Development ===
The original novel was published in 1971 and became a best-seller, selling over eight million copies. "It will make a whopping good movie," wrote the Los Angeles Times.

In 1976 Maclean's second wife Mary formed a company with producer Peter Snell, Aleelle Productions, who aimed to make movies based on MacLean novels including Golden Gate, Bear Island, The Way to Dusty Death and Captain Cook.

Film rights came solely into the hands of the Canadian-born Peter Snell who had lived in England since 1961. Snell set up the film in Canada, which was experiencing a film boom due to the assistance of tax concessions in 1976 allowing the write-off of losses on films that qualify as sufficiently Canadian. Snell wanted to make a film that targeted the international market; there would be no Canadian characters and the film was not set in Canada. However Snell and several of the actors and most of the crew were Canadian.

"Three in every eight households have a MacLean novel," said Snell. "He's certainly sold better than Ian Fleming. The James Bond pictures are fast running out of gimmicks. Action-adventure will always work better in the long run if you stay away from gimmicks."

Peter Snell enlisted director Don Sharp, who had worked on an adaptation of MacLean's Puppet on a Chain. They developed the project for several of months in the mid-1970s but Snell was unable to raise finance. However some time later the project reactivated.

Sharp decided to change the film crew in the novel to a scientific unit. "I don't think you can make films about film units," he later said adding "I think possibly we tried to put too much meaning and too much cast into an action adventure story. I think if we cut some of the character interaction and just played it for speed and thrills it might have made more money." Other changes from the novel included altering the characters, and arriving at the island earlier. Snell said MacLean was supportive of the changes.

=== Budget ===
In November 1978 it was announced the movie would be the most expensive made in Canada until that time, costing over $9 million. "You've got to come up with something television can't," said Snell. "You've got to come up with spectacle."

Of the budget, $3.3 million came from the British arm of Columbia Pictures, $3 million from the Canadian radio and cable television company, Selkirk Holdings, $1.8 million from the Toronto Dominion Bank, $1.2 million from the Bank of Montreal, and $100,000 from the Canadian Film Development Corporation (the latter was seed money for pre production and was paid back when the film was financed).

The Bank of Montreal lent the producers money to make the film. When the producers could not raise finance, the bank was forced to become investors.

Snell wanted to make the movie on location, feeling audiences would not react well the shooting "studio snow" which had been the method used on an earlier MacLean adaptation, Ice Station Zebra. "Audiences can tell styrofoam snow," said Snell.

It was the thirteenth film made from a MacLean novel. Snell said "He complained of no continuity" with the previous films "but with me he's close to being a partner. Usually his books get bought and he's invited to the premiere. In his case I'm on the phone regularly to him in Geneva where he lives and he's getting a kick out of it."

== Shooting ==
Filming started 22 November 1978 in Stewart, British Columbia. The unit were based at Stewart for seven weeks then moved to Glacier Bay National Park in Alaska.

Location filming in Stewart and Glacier Bay took three months. A Soviet ship was used to transport the unit. It was hired for three weeks but because of bad weather was needed for another week at $6,000 a day. The cast and crew numbered 103 and there were 101 Russian crewmembers, 66 of whom were women.

The shoot was difficult. Vic Armstrong was put in charge of the second unit. One day he went on a location scout up the mountain in a helicopter with Sharp, and three others and they were stuck for four days due to bad weather without food or proper clothing; they survived by staying in the helicopter and by eating the pilot's lunch over several days. When they returned, six feet of snow fell overnight and a week's filming was lost as they dug out of snow. Later on during the shoot, helicopter pilot John Soutar was killed in an accident.

The Swedish invention called Larven (The Caterpillar) by Lennart Nilsson is used in the chases around the island.

"We're delighted to be working on an international picture", said second unit director Alan Simmonds. "But co-productions can be a one-way street. The whole mentality of the film is English or American – the style, the amount of money. We're good, we know we're good, but the moneymen won't take a risk on Canadians."

The unit then moved to London where interiors were completed at Pinewood Studios.

Sutherland called his character "an intelligent, humorous, lonely man."

The film went a million dollars over budget, which Sharp says was the first time it had happened in his career. He later called the location "silly" because although it was spectacular visually and right for the story it was logistically difficult.

== Release ==
=== Critical ===
The Quarterly Review called it "murder on the Alaska Express... but, in search of something to take the children to which doesn't feature a scene of bestiality, you could do a lot worse". The Observer said it "has the same numbing effect as frost bite." MacLean's called it "a clinker if there ever was one."

The Globe and Mail said "one could perhaps be excused for expecting it to be a major disaster. It isn't: the Arctic landscapes are breathtaking, and some of the action sequences are not only active, but also exciting" but that "when compared to The Guns of Navarone... it's routine adventure- flick stuff: blood, guts and (a little) suspense intercut with acting of appalling quality, and dialogue that makes one yearn for the days of silent movies."

The Los Angeles Times called it "best left to the easily satisfied".

=== Box office ===
The film was a flop at the box office.

Sharp says the film "did alright" but had a lot of success on video.

During pre-production, Snell announced he had the film rights to six other MacLean novels, three of them not written. Snell and Selkirk were so positive about Bear Island's prospects that at one stage they planned a series of Alistair MacLean adaptations for annual Christmas release, starting with The Way to Dusty Death. That film was never made but Snell did go on to make The Hostage Tower and Air Force One is Down based on MacLean stories.
