= Paul Wheeler (writer) =

British screenwriter and novelist (1934–2025)

Paul Wheeler (23 May 1934 – 10 March 2025) was a British screenwriter and novelist.

== Life and career ==
Wheeler was born in Kingston, Jamaica on 23 May 1934. He obtained his BA from Exeter College, Oxford in 1959, and his MA from the University of Chicago in 1960.

As a screenwriter, he was best known for his scripts for The Medallion (2003), Caravan to Vaccares (1974) and The Terrorists (1975). He also wrote scripts for numerous television series like Tenko, Minder and Poldark. In the early 1980s, he published a novel on the Bodyline controversy, which was adapted as an Australian television series starring Hugo Weaving.

In 1964, Wheeler married Alexandra Martinez. He was related by marriage to the American journalist Morton Kondracke. Wheeler died on 10 March 2025, at the age of 90.
