= Puppet on a Chain =

1969 novel by Alistair MacLean

- First edition cover (UK)
- Author: Alistair MacLean
- Language: English
- Genre: Thriller
- Publisher: Collins (UK); Doubleday (US)
- Publication date: 1969
- Publication place: United Kingdom
- Preceded by: Force 10 from Navarone
- Followed by: Caravan to Vaccarès

Puppet on a Chain is a novel by Scottish author Alistair MacLean. Originally published in 1969 with a cover by Norman Weaver, it is set in the late 1960s narcotics underworld of Amsterdam and other locations in the Netherlands.

== Plot introduction ==
Paul Sherman is a veteran Interpol Narcotics Bureau agent, used to independent action and blunt force tactics. He is assisted by two attractive female agents, one an experienced operative, the other a rookie. Sherman is in the Netherlands after receiving word about a vicious heroin smuggling ring from a friend. However, the narco-criminals will kill ruthlessly to protect its operation and even before Sherman can leave Schiphol Airport he has already witnessed the gunning down of his key contact, been knocked half-unconscious by an assassin, and tangled with local authorities. "Puppet on a Chain" has the standard twisting plot, local atmospherics, and sardonic dialogue that were Maclean's trademarks as a story-teller. Maclean allows his protagonist to have a bantering sarcastic relationship with his assistants that provides a streak of humor as the plot unfolds. Unfortunately, Sherman's relationship with his assistants is used against him. As his investigation is undermined by betrayal, leaving him constantly a half-step behind his adversaries, Sherman must resort to increasingly violent action to turn the tables. The story culminates in a violent struggle above the streets of Amsterdam to save the life of his surviving female operative, not knowing whether anyone they meet can really be trusted.

== Reception ==
The New York Times called the book "one of the best in the Greene-Ambler-MacInnes tradition... the writing is as crisp as a sunny winter morning".

The book became a best seller.

== Background ==
MacLean got the idea for the book from visiting Amsterdam with then business partner Geoffrey Reeve who later directed the film version.

== Film adaptation ==
Puppet on a Chain later appeared in film as a 1970 movie directed by Geoffrey Reeve.
