= South by Java Head =

1958 book by Alistair MacLean

- First edition (UK)
- Author: Alistair MacLean
- Language: English
- Genre: World War II Novel
- Publisher: Collins (UK); Doubleday (US)
- Publication date: 1958
- Publication place: United Kingdom
- Media type: Print (Hardcover & Paperback)
- Pages: 254 pgs
- Preceded by: The Guns of Navarone
- Followed by: The Last Frontier

South by Java Head is the third novel written by Scottish author Alistair MacLean, and was first published in 1958.

MacLean's personal experiences in the Royal Navy during World War II provided part of the basis for the story.

== Plot introduction ==
The story is set in February 1942, in the immediate aftermath of the Battle of Singapore. As the British stronghold of Singapore falls to the invading Imperial Japanese Army, a mixed collection of soldiers, nurses, fleeing civilians, a small boy, and at least one spy attempt to escape the burning city aboard the Kerry Dancer, a battered freighter crewed by a disreputable captain and sailors. The Kerry Dancer is crippled by Japanese aircraft, and the refugees are rescued by the Viroma, a tanker also fleeing Singapore; however, the Viroma is also sunk by the Japanese, and the survivors take to open boats on the open sea. Led by stalwart First Officer John Nicholson, they attempt to flee to safety across the South China Sea, facing death by thirst and exposure, typhoons, and pursuit by the relentless Japanese. As tensions mount in the small boat, Nicholson realizes that they are equally at risk from traitors in their midst.

== Reception ==
The New York Times said it was "crammed with action and realistically sketched backgrounds but there is a patchness about the escapes from tight fixes that makes South by Java Head a less credible chronicle of derring-do than its remarkable predecessors."

== Film Adaptation ==
In 1957 producer Daniel Angel said that Daniel Fuchs was writing the script for South by Java Head from a novel by Tom Carling, with Fox to finance. MacLean's publisher Ian Chapman had not felt the novel was up to the standard of The Guns of Navarone and was going to suggest to MacLean that he try another novel instead. However the film sale of the project led to the novel's publication.

In January 1960 Buddy Adler announced he had bought the film rights for Fox as a vehicle for Alec Guinness and $4 million would be spent on it. Sydney Boehm would write the script. No film resulted.
