= Breakheart Pass (film) =

1975 film by Tom Gries

- Theatrical release poster by Mort Künstler
- Directed by: Tom Gries
- Written by: Alistair MacLean
- Based on: Breakheart Pass by Alistair MacLean
- Produced by: Jerry Gershwin; Elliott Kastner
- Starring: Charles Bronson; Ben Johnson; Richard Crenna; Jill Ireland; Charles Durning; Ed Lauter; David Huddleston
- Cinematography: Lucien Ballard
- Edited by: Byron Brandt
- Music by: Jerry Goldsmith
- Production company: Gershwin-Kastner Productions
- Distributed by: United Artists
- Release date: December 25, 1975 (Finland)
- Running time: 95 minutes
- Country: United States
- Language: English
- Budget: $6 million
- Box office: $2,130,000

Breakheart Pass is a 1975 American Western film that stars Charles Bronson, Ben Johnson, Richard Crenna, and Jill Ireland. Based on the 1974 novel of the same title by Scottish author Alistair MacLean (1922–1987), it was filmed in north-central Idaho.

== Plot ==
In the 1870s, residents of the garrison at the Fort Humboldt frontier outpost of the United States Army are reported to be suffering from a diphtheria epidemic. A special express train is heading up into the remote mountain ranges towards the fort filled with reinforcements and medical supplies. Also, civilian passengers are on the train in the rear luxurious private car – Nevada Governor Fairchild and his fiancée Marica, the daughter of the fort's commander.

The train stops briefly in the small whistle stop settlement of Myrtle, where it takes on board local lawman United States Marshal Pearce and his prisoner, John Deakin, a supposedly notorious outlaw who was identified by a picture in a newspaper advertisement offering a $2,000 reward. As the journey goes on through the snowy mountains several train passengers are mysteriously killed or go missing. The remaining troops, except Major Claremont and the replacement fireman, are killed when the rear carriages are separated and derailed in an act of sabotage. Deakin, who is actually an undercover U.S. Secret Service agent, discovers en route that the "epidemic" at the outpost is actually a conspiracy between a group of killers led by the notorious outlaw Levi Calhoun and a tribe of Native Americans under Chief White Hand. Instead of medical supplies, the train's boxcars are transporting a large secret shipment of firearms, ammunition and dynamite stolen from U.S. manufacturers for sale to the Natives, in return for allowing Calhoun and his men to mine and smuggle gold from their lands. Most of the people on the train, including Governor Fairchild and Marshal Pearce, are Calhoun's partners in crime, and those innocents who discover the evidence for his sinister plot are eliminated. Eventually, Deakin narrows his list of possible uninvolved allies down to Marica and Claremont, who agrees to assist the agent in his efforts to prevent the arms delivery.

At snow-covered Breakheart Pass, all hell breaks loose. The impatient Natives intercept the train to take the weapons they were promised, and Calhoun and his men ride out to the train to find out what is going on. Deakin and Major Claremont use dynamite to blow up and damage the track rails, grounding the train before it reaches the fort; and while Deakin runs interference, Claremont rushes ahead to Fort Humboldt to free the soldiers imprisoned by Calhoun's gang. A gunfight breaks out when the freed soldiers clash with the Natives and bandits at the train. Calhoun is killed by Fairchild when he threatens Marica, but then the governor is in turn cut down by Claremont. At the end of the battle, Deakin intercepts Marshal Pearce and shoots him when the corrupt lawman decides to go down fighting.

== Cast ==
- Charles Bronson as US Secret Service Agent John Deakin / John Murray
- Ben Johnson as US Marshal Pearce
- Richard Crenna as Governor Richard Fairchild
- Jill Ireland as Marica Scoville
- Charles Durning as O'Brien
- Ed Lauter as Major Claremont
- Bill McKinney as Reverend Peabody
- David Huddleston as Dr. Molyneux
- Roy Jenson as Chris Banion
- Rayford Barnes as Sergeant Bellew
- Scott Newman as Rafferty
- Robert Tessier as Levi Calhoun (voiced by Paul Frees (uncredited))
- Joe Kapp as Henry, The Steward
- Archie Moore as Carlos, The Cook
- Sally Kirkland as Jane–Marie, First Prostitute
- Sally Kemp as Second Prostitute
- Eddie Little Sky as Chief White Hand
- Keith McConnell as Gabriel
- John Mitchum as Red Beard
- Read Morgan as Captain Oakland
- Robert Rothwell as Lieutenant Newell
- Casey Tibbs as Jackson
- Doug Atkins as Jebbo
- Eldon Burke as Ferguson (uncredited)
- Irv Faling as Colonel Scoville (uncredited)
- William Klein as Seamon Devlin (uncredited)
- Ron Ponozzo as Soldier (uncredited)

== Production ==
=== Writing ===
Producers Elliott Kastner and Jerry Gershwin had filmed a number of Alistair MacLean novels previously, including Where Eagles Dare and When Eight Bells Toll.

=== Casting ===
Charles Bronson was paid $1 million plus 10% of the gross for his role.

Lewiston realtor Irv Falling, a retired U.S. Army colonel, played a cameo role as the father of Marica, Gov. Fairchild's fiancée (Jill Ireland) in the final snowy scene, as frontier army colonel and commander at Fort Humboldt reunites with his daughter. He had helped the Bronsons find a home to rent. Bronson and Ireland arrived in Lewiston for filming in early March 1975 and stayed at 322 Stewart Avenue.

=== Filming ===
Some exteriors were filmed in Pierce and Reubens in north-central Idaho; the Native American extras were Nez Perce, mostly from nearby Lapwai.

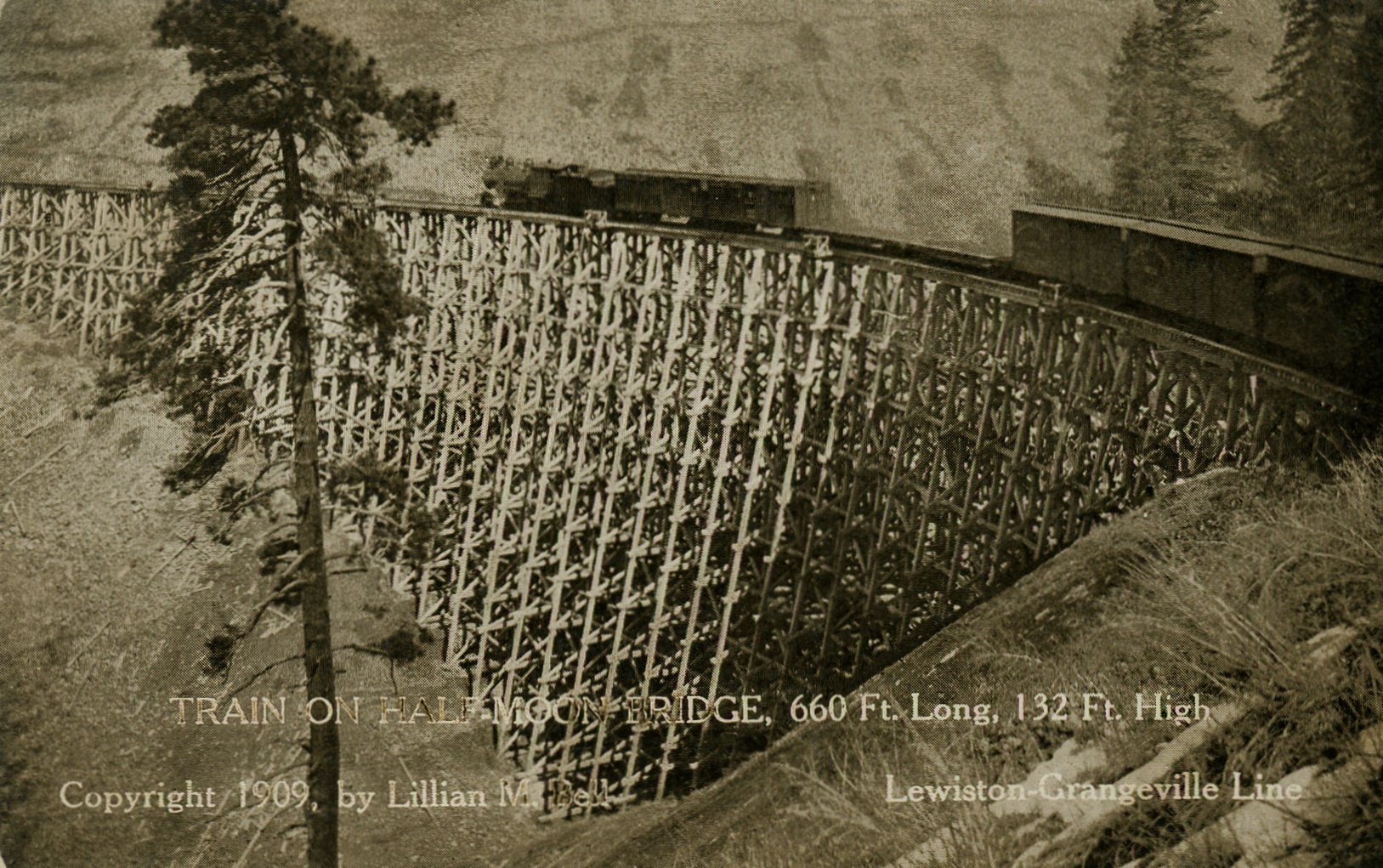
Half Moon Trestle (1909) (46.325°N 116.5743°W)

Railroad scenes were filmed on the Camas Prairie Railroad (based in Lewiston). The hire of the train (Great Western Railway steam locomotive #75) carriages and track cost $500,000 (approximately $2,992,000 today). Opening scenes in the Myrtle settlement / "whistle stop" were shot at a specially built set (to look like an old abandoned gold-rush town) just outside Arrow Junction, about fifteen miles (25 km) east of Lewiston along the lower Clearwater River.

It was the final film role participation for longtime veteran stuntman Yakima Canutt, who was aged 79 at the time. He was in charge of the second unit direction; his son, Joe, was one of the stuntmen. Canutt oversaw the scene where the caboose and troop carriages crashed off the rail line into a ravine. Six cameras filmed the cars falling 200 feet (60 m) into the canyon, but the dummies (representing the soldiers) failed to fall out during the crash, which was filmed at Half Moon Trestle (46.325°N 116.5743°W), east of U.S. Route 95 in Lapwai Canyon. Alternating shots of clear and overcast skies are present in the final climactic scenes.

Bronson later said that in the original story, his character was not revealed as being a detective until the end. When he read an early script, the reveal was made much earlier. Bronson demanded it be changed to the way it was in the original story, and this was done. During filming, Bronson discovered the script had been changed again to reveal his character was a detective early. Bronson was unhappy with this but went along with it as by then filming was underway and he felt he could not leave the production.

== Music ==
A limited-edition (3,000 run) CD soundtrack of Breakheart Pass, highlighting the original music of Jerry Goldsmith, was released by La-La Land Records. It is out of print.

== Release ==
=== Home media ===
==== DVD ====
- Release date: December 19, 2000
- Full Screen & Widescreen Anamorphic
- Region: 1
- Aspect Ratio: 1.33:1 & 16:9
- Audio tracks: English, French
- Subtitles: English, Spanish
- Running time: 95 minutes

Kino Video released Breakheart Pass for the first time on Blu-ray on August 12, 2014.

== Reception ==
=== Box office ===
The film was a box-office disappointment in the United States.

=== Critical response ===
In the Los Angeles Times, critic Kevin Thomas called it, "a fun if familiar picture, but is played so broadly on such an elementary level that it can hope to satisfy only the most undemanding of viewer."

== See also ==
- List of American films of 1975
