= The Last Frontier (novel) =

1959 novel by Alistair MacLean

- First edition (UK)
- Author: Alistair MacLean
- Language: English
- Genre: Thriller novel
- Publisher: Collins (UK); Doubleday (US)
- Publication date: 1959
- Publication place: United Kingdom
- Media type: Print (Hardback & Paperback)
- Pages: 253 pp
- Preceded by: South by Java Head
- Followed by: Night Without End

The Last Frontier is a 1959 novel written by Scottish author Alistair MacLean. It was released in the United States under the title The Secret Ways. This novel marks MacLean's first foray into the espionage thriller genre, and was inspired by the events surrounding the Hungarian Revolution of 1956.

Writing in the third person narrative, MacLean described the physical and political surroundings with more attention than he has in previous novels, and there are moments when MacLean purposely slows the action down to build character development.

== Plot ==
Michael Reynolds, MacLean's protagonist, is a British secret agent on a wintertime mission inside Hungary at the height of the Cold War. Reynolds must rescue Professor Jennings, an elderly British scientist who is held by the communist government against his will. Reynolds is no James Bond and does not have any fancy gadgets but he is highly resourceful. His biggest advantages against the sometimes cruel and highly efficient Hungarian Secret Police are an ability to make commonsense on-the-spot decisions and the heroic help of friends in the Hungarian underground. Reynolds hooks up with the mysterious Jansci and his friend “the Count” and they strive to transport the professor over the border and back to England. The plot has the twists, turns, and betrayals in which MacLean specialized, and Reynolds realizes that he has only one chance to escape with Jennings before he is captured and killed by the Hungarian secret police.

== Film adaptation ==
The Last Frontier appeared in film under its alternative title of The Secret Ways in an April 1961 release directed by Phil Karlson. Reynolds was played by Richard Widmark. The movie was filmed in Zurich and Vienna. It was the first of MacLean's works to appear as a movie, as The Guns of Navarone was not released until June 1961. According to an interview with Euan Lloyd in Cinema Retro magazine, producer and star Widmark had disagreements with Karlson, who felt he should use a tongue-in-cheek approach for the story. Perhaps because one of the screenwriters was Widmark's wife, Jean Hazelwood, Widmark took over directing the film.

== Influence ==
Lee Child thought the novel was MacLean's best and said it was influential on Child's own writing, saying "Looking back on it, it was a rather hysterical Cold War novel, but it had some of the best-drawn characters I had read in the genre... Even today I can sense MacLean's influence. I learnt a valuable lesson in how to write a hero who is totally full-blooded without going over the top."
