= Fear Is the Key (novel) =

1961 novel by Alistair MacLean

- First edition cover (UK)
- Author: Alistair MacLean
- Cover artist: John Keay
- Language: English
- Genre: Thriller novel
- Publisher: Collins (UK); Fawcett (US)
- Publication date: 1961
- Publication place: United Kingdom
- Pages: 234 pp.
- Preceded by: The Last Frontier
- Followed by: The Dark Crusader

Fear Is the Key is a 1961 first-person narrative thriller novel by Scottish author Alistair MacLean.

== Plot introduction ==
In the prologue, set in May 1958, John Talbot, owner of Trans Carib Air Charter Co, is at an airfield in British Honduras, awaiting radio contact with one of his aircraft en route to Tampa, Florida, which is being piloted by his twin brother and in which his wife and baby son are passengers. Not long after he establishes contact the aircraft is attacked by a P-51 Mustang, after which all contact is lost.

Two years later Talbot is on trial for robbing a bank. At a point where his guilt is in doubt, new information comes to light implicating him in the death of a police officer. Now desperate, he escapes by taking a young woman hostage from the court room and stealing a car. However, he is tracked down by a private detective, Herman Jablonski, who reveals that the young woman is Mary Ruthven, daughter of oil millionaire General Ruthven. Jablonski turns Talbot over to the General and his three business associates - Vyland, Royale and Larry (Vyland’s drug-addict son) - who, instead of turning him over to the police, hire him for an unspecified task, retaining Jablonski to keep him under guard.

In a plot reveal, we discover that Talbot and Jablonski, a former police officer, have engineered the scenario, for reasons as yet unknown. Talbot slips out of the General's house and travels to an oil platform in the Gulf of Mexico, searching it for signs of something out of the ordinary. On his return he finds Royale and Larry burying something in the grounds of the General's house. After they have finished he discovers that they were burying Jablonski's body and, now needing another ally, persuades Ruthven's British chauffeur, Kennedy, to help him.

Talbot returns to the house and next day is taken to the oil platform, where he finds that Ruthven and his associates need Talbot to operate a submersible. Talbot carries out another reconnaissance of the platform, in the process killing Larry who had been suspicious of him. Managing to avoid further discovery, he and the remaining two associates use the submersible to investigate the wreck of a DC-3. Talbot turns the tables on his captors, revealing that the wrecked aircraft contains the bodies of his family. The aircraft was shot down by Vyland's associates in order to steal its cargo of gold; they have been threatening the General and his family to force him to provide the necessary resources. Talbot has been working for the authorities all along and convinces Vyland and Royale that, after temporarily disconnecting the submersible’s oxygen supply, he is now ready to die on the ocean floor beside his family, eliciting a terror-stricken confession from the two men, their fear of death being the key that unlocks the confession, which is relayed to witnesses on the oil platform. Talbot then returns to the oil platform, where Vyland throws himself to his death from a ladder. Royale survives to be tried and sentenced to death, Mary and Kennedy end up together and Talbot, politely turning down General Ruthven's offer of any reward of his choosing, walks off alone.

== Film, TV or theatrical adaptations ==
A film appeared in 1972 directed by Michael Tuchner. The protagonist, Talbot, was played by Barry Newman, and the millionaire's daughter Sarah Ruthven by Suzy Kendall. The movie features a soundtrack by Roy Budd.

== References in other media ==
Suite: Judy Blue Eyes, by Crosby, Stills and Nash, contains the lyric "Fear is the lock, and laughter the key to your heart."
