= Geoffrey Reeve =

British film director and producer

- Born: 28 October 1932; Tring, Hertfordshire England
- Died: 3 January 2010 (aged 77); London
- Occupation: director-producer
- Years active: 1970–2003
- Spouse(s): Gina Gurney (1956, divorced); Jennifer Clare (fashion model)(survives him)
- Children: Katherine Wightmann (actress); Emma Victoria Reeve (fashion); Jim Reeve (film producer); Tom Reeve (film producer and director).

Geoffrey Reeve (1932–2010) was a British film director and producer. After graduating at Oxford with a degree in law, he moved to Canada. There he got a job at Imperial Chemical Industries, making promotional films for the company.

== Credits ==
=== Producer ===
- The Far Pavilions (1984, TV, 1 episode)
- The Shooting Party (1985)

=== Director ===
- Puppet on a Chain (1970)
- Caravan to Vaccares (1974)
- Souvenir (1989)
- The Way to Dusty Death (1995, TV film)

=== Producer and Director ===
- Shadow Run (1998)
