= Tetsu Yano =

Japanese science fiction translator and writer (1923–2004)

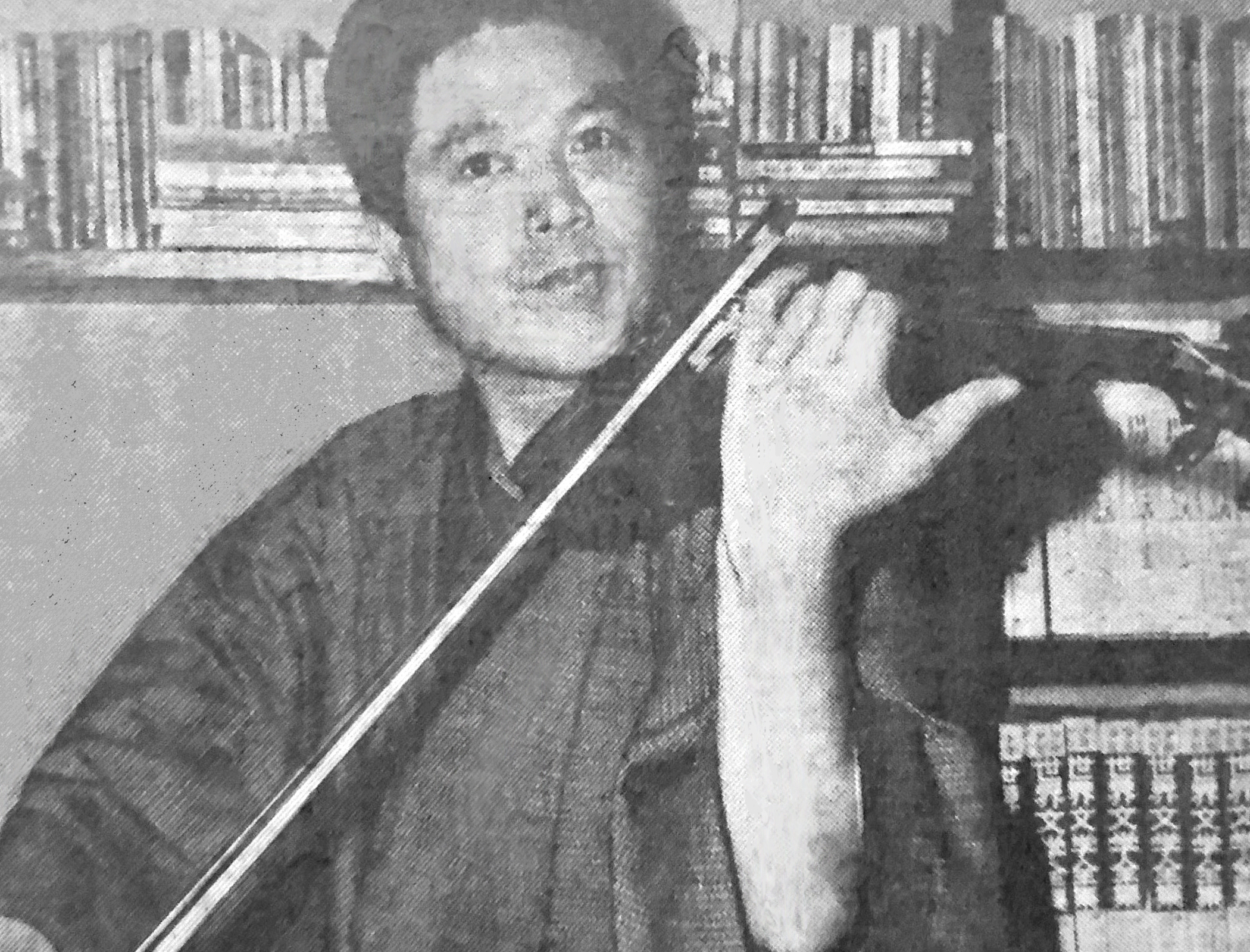
Tetsu Yano in 1964. (At the right-hand bottom, the spines of several books are visible. These are Shōnen Shōjo Sekai Bungaku Zenshū by Kodansha. (Note: 少年少女世界文学全集 (The collection of the world literature for boys and girls). This is the monument, the famous and excellent collection of the World literature for Young Adult in 1950s. For Yano, this collection was very important.)).

Tetsu Yano (Japanese 矢野徹 Yano Tetsu; October 5, 1923 – October 13, 2004) was a Japanese translator and writer of science fiction, fantasy, adventure stories and young adult novels. He was a founder and promoter of the Japanese science fiction at the dawn of this genre in Japan.

Yano introduced the works of British and American science fiction writers to Japanese readers through almost half centuries from the late 1940s. He was also the first Japanese writer of the genre to visit the United States, in 1953. He took part in founding Science Fiction and Fantasy Writers of Japan (SFWJ, 日本SF作家クラブ) in 1963, and served as its president from 1978 to 1979.

== Biography ==
Yano was born in 1923 at Matsuyama, Ehime Prefecture. He entered the faculty of engineering, Chuo University and studied for three years. Then, he was drafted into the cavalry regiment of the Imperial Japanese Army, serving two years and two months as a tank crewman. After the war he graduated from the Chuō University and lived in Kobe, Hyogo prefecture. Yano found everything were burnt, the house and his collection of some hundreds of books.

=== Encounter with science fiction ===
While working as an amateur interpreter, Yano happened to find that American soldiers were throwing many books into the boiler to burn them, at a US military base in Kyoto. Yano asked these books to give him and tried to read them. This was Yano's encounter with science fiction.

He learned to read English and eventually began translating science fiction. The works of Robert A. Heinlein, Frederik Pohl, Desmond Bagley, and Frank Herbert were among the some 360 translations by him. He also wrote stories of his own, including The Legend of the Paper Spaceship, which first appeared in English translation in 1984 and has appeared in several collections. Some of his stories have been adapted into anime.

Yano died on October 13, 2004, from cancer of the large intestine. Although he made a partial recovery after an operation in November of the previous year, he relapsed. His funeral was held on October 16, 2004. The SFWJ gave the Special Award of Nihon SF Taisho Award for his contributions to Japanese science fiction.

== Awards ==
- 1985 Special Award of Japan Adventure Novels Association Taishō.
- 1985 Karel Award for his translation contributions from the World SF.
- 1988-08 Seiun Award for Wizardry Diary.
- 2004-12 Special Award of Nihon SF Taishō Award for contributions to Japanese science fiction.
- 2005-07 Seiun Award for contributions to Japanese science fiction.

== Works ==
=== Novels ===
- Chikyū zero nen (地球0年) 1969 Rippu shobo
- Kamui no Ken (カムイの剣) 1970, Rippu shobo

The Dagger of Kamui

- Shinsekai yūgekitai (新世界遊撃隊) 1972 Tsuru shobo seikosha
- Orgami uchūsen no densetsu (折紙宇宙船の伝説) 1978 Hayakawa shobo

The Legend of the Paper Spaceship

- Karasu no umi (カラスの海) 1977 Kadokawa shoten
- 442 rentai sentōdan (442連隊戦闘団) 1979 Kadokawa shoten
- Jisatsu sensuikan totsugeki seyo (自殺潜水艦突撃せよ) 1980 Kadokawa shoten
- Akumu no senjō (悪夢の戦場) 1982 Hayakawa shobo
- Kōtei heika no senjō (皇帝陛下の戦場) 1983 Kadokawa shoten
- Telepath-gari no wakusei (テレパス狩りの惑星) 1992 Hayakawa shobo
- Sōgen wo yuku hansen (草原をゆく帆船) 1993 Hayakawa shobo
- Sabaku no time-machine (砂漠のタイムマシン) 1993 Hayakawa shobo

=== Essays ===
- Kaminari kara TV made 雷からテレビまで, Shinchosha, 1958
- SF no Hon'yaku 矢野徹・SFの翻訳, Kisōtengaisha, 1981
- Wizardry Nikki ウィザードリィ日記, パソコン文化の冒険, MIE, 1987

== Translations ==
Young Adult fictions

Yano translated and published story for both young adult and general people. (Note: For instance, there are two translated books for Odd John by Olaf Stapledon, Esper-tō Monogatari and Odd John.)

- Mohikan-zoku no Saigo (The Last of the Mohicans) 1826, by James Fenimore Cooper
- Chikyū Saigo no Hi (When Worlds Collide) 1933, by Philip Wylie and Edwin Balmer
- Esper-tō Monogatari (Odd John) 1935, by Olaf Stapledon
- Utau Hakkotsu (Jane Brown's Body) 1938, by Cornell Woolrich
- Norowareta Ushūsen (Orphans of the Sky) 1941/1963, by Robert A. Heinlein
- Chōjin Shūdan (The Deviates) 1956, by Raymond F. Jones

Fantasy

Yano especially loved the stories by Robert Nathan.

- Bārī-mura no Vaiorin-hiki (The Fiddler in Barley) 1926, by Robert Nathan
- Kikori no Ie (The Woodcutter's House) 1927, by Robert Nathan
- Yume no Kuni wo Yuku Hansen (The Enchanted Voyage) 1936, by Robert Nathan
- Tapiola no Bōken (Tapiola's Brave Regiment) 1941, by Robert Nathan
- Natsu wa Tōku Sugite (Long After Summer) 1948, by Robert Nathan
- Sore yueni Ai wa Modoru (So Love Returns) 1958, by Robert Nathan

Science Fiction

- Tōshi (Gladiator) 1930, by Philip Wylie
- Odd John (Odd John) 1935, by Olaf Stapledon
- Chōseimei Vaiton (Sinister Barrier) 1943, by Eric Frank Russell
- Tenkai no Ō (The Star Kings) 1949, by Edmond Hamilton
- Ningen Ijou (More Than Human) 1953, by Theodore Sturgeon
- Uchū Seizōsha (The Universe Maker) 1953, by A. E. van Vogt
- Toki no Shihaisha (The Time Master) 1953, Wilson Tucker
- Chōnōryoku Agent (Wild Talent) 1954, by Wilson Tucker
- Midori no Hoshi no Odessei (The Green Odyssey) 1957, by Philip José Farmer
- Uchū no Senshi (Starship Troopers) 1959, by Robert A. Heinlein
- Uchū no Koji (Orphans of the Sky) 1941/1963, by Robert A. Heinlein
- Tsuki wa Mujihina Yoru no Joō (The Moon Is a Harsh Mistress) 1966, by Robert A. Heinlein
- Akutoku nanka Kowakunai (I Will Fear No Evil) 1970, by Robert A. Heinlein
- Dune (Dune) 1965, by Frank Herbert
- Komandā 1 (Commander 1) 1965, by Peter George
- Altair kara kita Iruka (The Dolphins of Altair) 1967, by Margaret St. Clair
- Hauser no Kioku (Hauser's Memory) 1968, by Curt Siodmak
- Bettyann yo Kaere (Bettyann) 1970, by Kris Neville
- Jigoku no Ie (Hell House) 1971, by Richard Matheson
- Yari-tsukuri no Run (Run, The Spearmaker) 1975, by Kris Neville
- Dune series (Dune saga) from 1965, by Frank Herbert et al.
  - Dune - Suna no Wakusei (Dune) 1965, Frank Herbert
  - Dune - Sabaku no Kyūseishu (Dune Messiah) 1969, by Frank Herbert
  - Dune - Sakyū no Kodomo-tachi (Children of Dune) 1976, by Frank Herbert
  - Dune - Sabaku no Shin-Kōtei (God Emperor of Dune) 1981, by Frank Herbert
  - Dune - Sabaku no Itansha (Heretics of Dune) 1984, by Frank Herbert
  - Dune - Sakyū no Dai-Seidō (Chapterhouse: Dune) 1985, by Frank Herbert
  - Kōke Atreide - Dune e no Michi (Dune: House Atreides) 1999, by Brian Herbert and Kevin J. Anderson
  - Kōke Harkonnen - Dune e no Michi (Dune: House Harkonnen) 2000, by Brian Herbert and Kevin J. Anderson
  - Kōke Corrino - Dune e no Michi (Dune: House Corrino) 2001, by Brian Herbert and Kevin J. Anderson

Thirillers and Adventures

- Kasei no Dai-Shōgun (The Warlord of Mars) 1919, by Edgar Rice Burroughs
- Tāzan to Ōgon Toshi (Tarzan and the City of Gold) 1933, Edgar Rice Burroughs
- Tāzan to Lion Man (Tarzan and the Lion Man) 1934, Edgar Rice Burroughs
- Tāzan to Kinjirareta Miyako (Tarzan and the Forbidden City) 1938, Edgar Rice Burroughs
- Tāzan to Kyōjin (Tarzan and the Madman) 1964, by Edgar Rice Burroughs
- Saigo no Kokkyōsen (The Last Frontier) 1959 by Alistair MacLean
- Hatten-shō ga Naru Toki (When Eight Bells Toll) 1966, by Alistair MacLean
- Saraba California (Goodbye California) 1978, by Alistair MacLean
- Takai Toride (High Citadel) 1965, by Desmond Bagley
- Hurricane (Wyatt's Hurricane) 1966, by Desmond Bagley
- Ōgon no Tegami (The Vivero Letter) 1968, by Desmond Bagley
- Sabaku no Ryakudatsusha (The Spoilers) 1969, by Desmond Bagley
- Uragiri no Hyōga (Running Blind) 1970, by Desmond Bagley
- Taito-rōpu Man (The Tightrope Men) 1973, by Desmond Bagley
- Snow Tiger (The Snow Tiger) 1975, by Desmond Bagley
- Teki (The Enemy) 1977, by Desmond Bagley

== English translated novel ==
- The Dagger of Kamui (Kamui no Ken)

== Notes and references ==
- Masao Azuma and Ran Ishido eds. The Dictionary of Japanese Fantasy Writers, (2009), 東雅夫＆石堂藍編『日本幻想作家事典』国書刊行会（2009）ISBN 978-4-336-05142-4
- Tetsu Yano Translation of SF, (1981), 矢野徹『SFの翻訳』奇想天外社 (1981)
- S-F Magazine 2005 January issue, 「追悼・矢野徹」, Hayakawa Publishing
- "Afterword", Robert Nathan The Enchanted Voyage, trd. by Tetsu Yano, 「後書き」, ロバート・ネイサン『夢の国をゆく帆船』矢野徹訳, 早川書房, 1974
