= Bagley (surname) =

Bagley is a surname.

== Notable people with this name include ==
- Ben Bagley (1933–1998), American musical theatre and record producer
- David W. Bagley (1883–1960), Admiral in the United States Navy during World War II
- Desmond Bagley (1923–1983), British journalist and novelist
- Edward Bagley (1876–1961), British soldier and politician
- Edwin Eugene Bagley (1857–1922), American composer
- Florence Bagley (1874–1952), American psychologist
- Frances Bagley (born 1946), American sculptor
- George A. Bagley (1826–1915), United States Representative from New York
- George R. Bagley (1871–1939), American attorney and jurist in Oregon
- Harry T. Bagley (1874–1919), American attorney and politician and mayor of Hillsboro, Oregon
- James W. Bagley (1881–1947) was an American aerial photographer, topographic engineer and inventor.
- John Bagley (basketball) (born 1960), American basketball player in the National Basketball Association
- John H. Bagley Jr. (1832–1902), United States Representative from New York
- John J. Bagley (1832–1881), American politician and Governor of Michigan
- Larry Bagley (born 1949), American politician and Louisiana state representative
- Mark Bagley (born 1957), American comic book artist
- Marvin Bagley III (born 1999), American basketball player
- Melville Sewell Bagley (1838–1880), American businessman who lived most of his life in Argentina
- Pat Bagley (born 1956), American editorial cartoonist and journalist
- Rodney Bagley (1934–2023), American co-inventor of the catalytic converter
- Ross Bagley (born 1988), American actor
- Tennent H. Bagley (1925–2014), CIA officer
- Thomas Bagley (priest) (before 1430–1431), priest in England in the fifteenth century
- Thomas Bagley (footballer) (1909–1995), English professional footballer in the 1930s
- Tom Bagley (racing driver) (born 1939), American former driver in the USAC and CART Championship Car series
- Will Bagley (1950–2021), Utah historian
- William Bagley (educator) (1874–1946), American educator and editor
- William Bagley (footballer) (before 1933 – after 1941), English association football player
- Worth Bagley (1874–1898), American naval officer and the only United States Navy officer killed in action during the Spanish–American War
