= Thomas Bagley =

Thomas Bagley may refer to:

- Thomas Bagley (priest) (died 1431), priest in England
- Thomas Bagley (footballer) (1909-1995), English footballer
- Tom Bagley (racing driver) (born 1939), American former driver in the USAC and CART Championship Car series
- Tom Bagley (musician) (born 1965), Canadian musician
