= The Vivero Letter =

The Vivero Letter may refer to:

- The Vivero Letter (novel), a 1968 novel by Desmond Bagley
- The Vivero Letter (film), a 1998 adventure film based on the novel
