= Running Blind =

Running Blind may refer to:

- Running Blind (Child novel), a 2000 novel by Lee Child
- Running Blind (Bagley novel), a 1970 Desmond Bagley novel
- Running Blind, a 1979 three-part TV series by the BBC based on the Desmond Bagley novel
- "Running Blind" (song), a 2004 song by the American band Godsmack
- Running Blind, a 2002 album by Ken Hensley
- Running Blind (EP), a solo EP by Radiohead drummer Phil Selway
