= George Bagley =

George Bagley may refer to:

- George A. Bagley (1826–1915), United States Representative from New York
- George R. Bagley (1871–1939), American attorney and jurist in the state of Oregon
