= Bigley =

Bigley is a surname. Notable people with the name include:

- Billy Bigley (born 1962), American racing driver
- Isabel Bigley (1926–2006), American actress
- Kenneth Bigley (1942–2004), British civil engineer
- Kevin Bigley (born 1986), American actor
- Taylor Bigley (born 1971) American businessman

== See also ==
- Bagley (surname)
