= Drammen Spiral =

Helix-shaped road tunnel in Drammen, Norway

Coordinates: 59.7519°N 10.2006°E

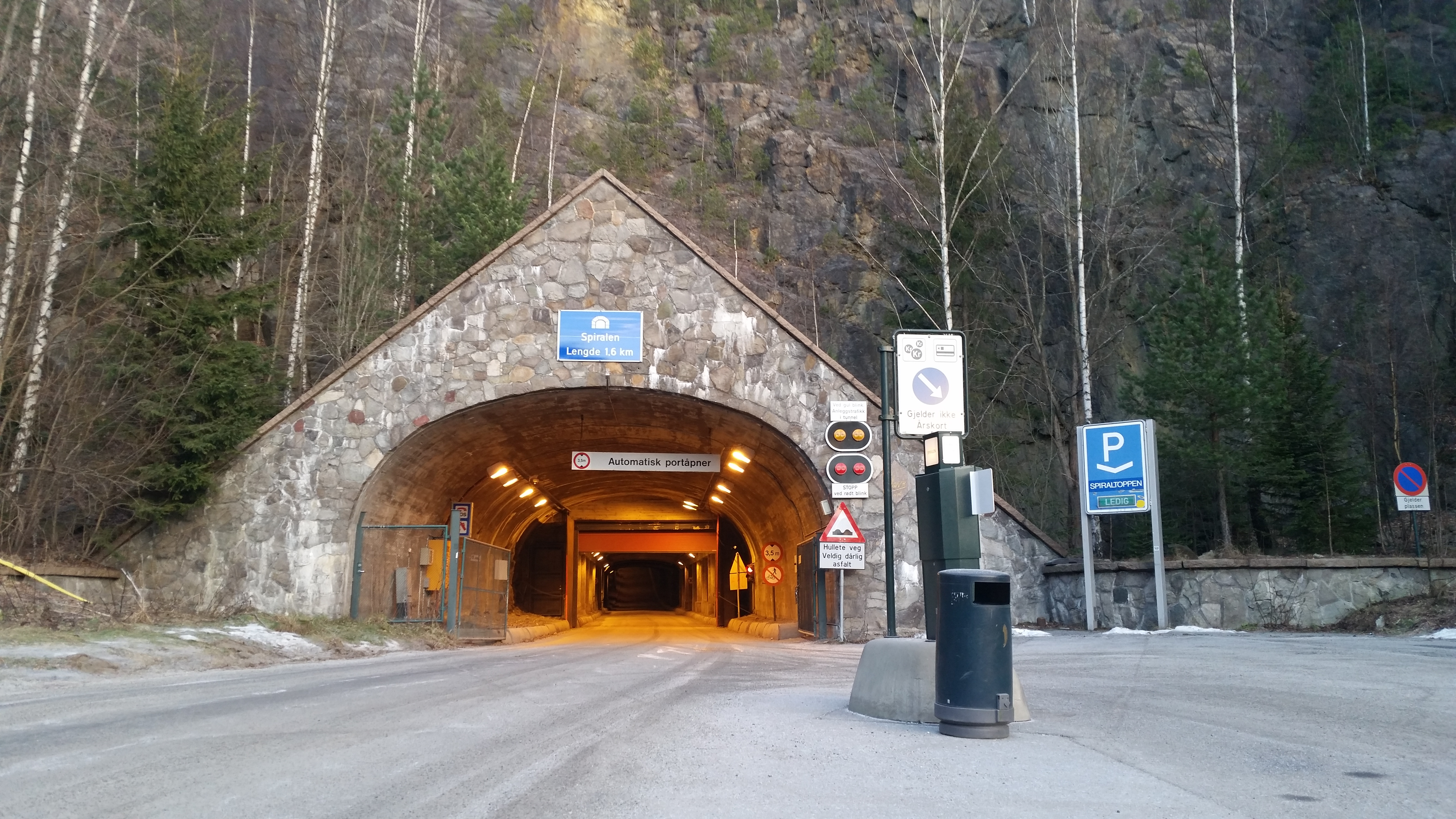
- Entrance to the spiral
- Interactive map of Drammen Spiral

Operation
- Opened: 1961

Technical
- Length: 1650m

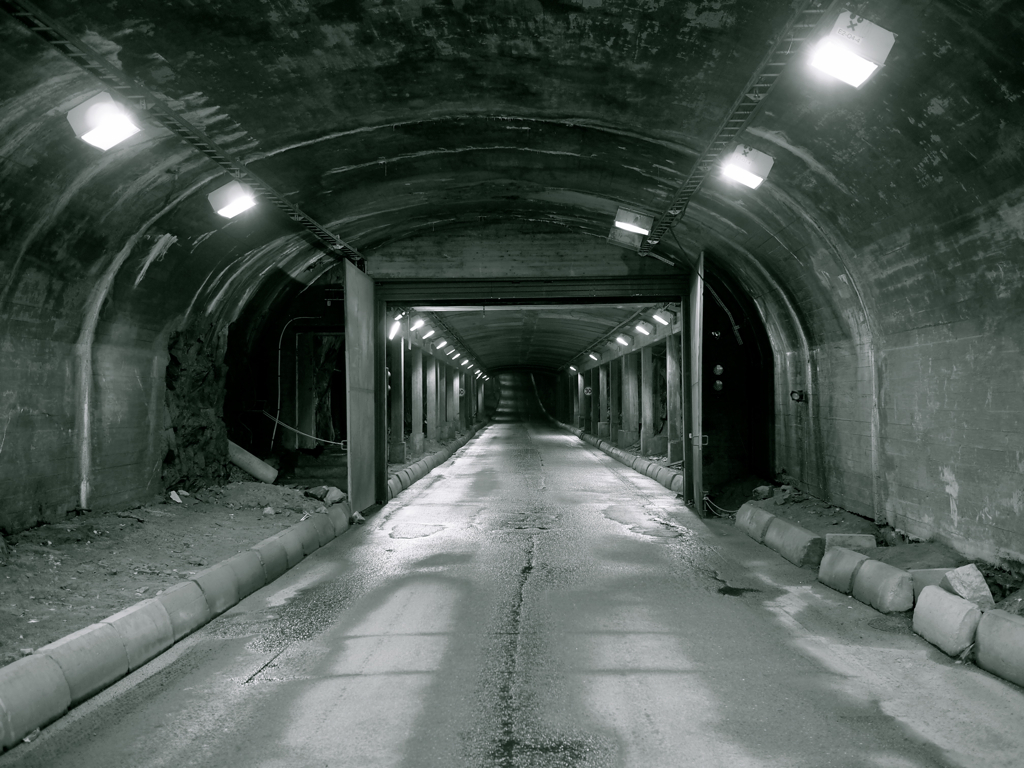
Inside the tunnel

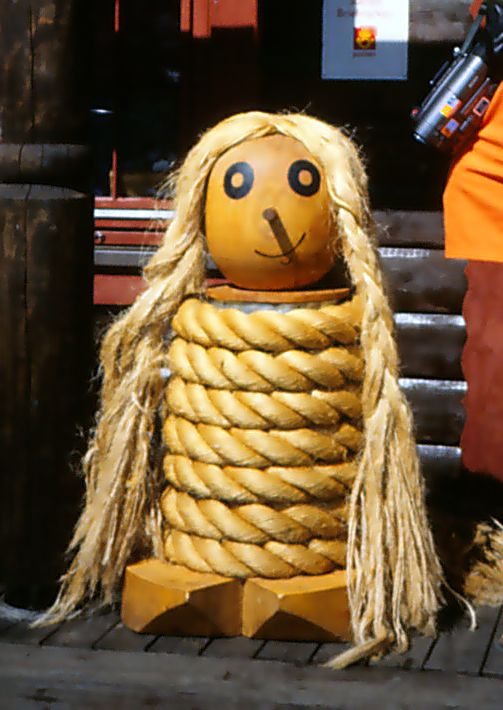
Spiral troll

The Drammen Spiral (Norwegian : Spiralen Drammen) is a tunnel near Drammen, Norway.

== Tunnel characteristics ==
The tunnel is 1,650 metres (5,410 ft) long and in the shape of a helix, with six rising circles, in the same style as a multi-storey parking lot. Each rotation of the helix rises 73 feet (22 m), with a diameter of 230 feet (70 m). The tunnel emerges at a summit 600 feet (180 m) above the town on Skansen Ridge, where there are parking facilities and a cafe.

== Tunnel usage ==
From the summit, tourists can walk in the Drammensmarka, the forest area surrounding Drammen. There is a road toll levied for use of the tunnel, which for cars as of 2020 was NOK 35, paid as a parking fee at the top. The maximum height for vehicles is 3.65 metres (12.0 ft). Pedestrians may not use the tunnel: instead there is a gravelled zigzag track up the hillside with seats and viewpoints. Average daily traffic in 2020 was 350 vehicles, but usage can vary from 100 to 2000 vehicles per day depending on the season.

== History ==
Drammen city ground conditions are poor, with most buildings being founded on clay. Gravel was obtained from a quarry, but by the 1950s concern was raised that quarrying was beginning to disfigure the local landscape. Eivind Olsen was the city engineer at the time, and he proposed the idea of tunnelling for gravel. Olsen came to be nicknamed 'Father of the Spiral Tunnel'. The community decided to tunnel for stone as an alternative to quarrying, creating a tourist attraction as a by-product. Construction started in 1953 upon closure of the quarries. Rock excavated for the tunnel was crushed and used to make a harbour embankment in the city, while stone was used in concrete. The rock is a type of granite named after the city: Drammensgranitt (Drammen granite). The tunnel was opened for traffic in 1961 by King Olav V.

From October 2019 the tunnel went through extensive renovation and was closed for months. Refurbishment included numerous structural and safety improvements as well as adding coloured lighting to make the tunnel an even bigger tourist attraction. The lighting changes according to the time of day. The work cost around 10 million euros and the tunnel was officially reopened on Dec 12 2020. The tunnel is owned and operated by the Drammen Kommune (municipal administration).

== In popular culture ==
Desmond Bagley's 1973 novel The Tightrope Men features a scene where the protagonist Giles Denison drives cautiously up through the tunnel and then is pursued at speed back down it by another car.

The Drammen Spiral is also featured in Thapan Dubayehudi's novel, Selah: The Jewish Avengers, in which Testarossa Abelov and Abilene Abelova drives up the Spiral to reunite with their family after 15 years.

The Spiral Troll is a souvenir doll made from wood with rope coiled around it. The tunnel formerly had a carved wooden troll installed halfway up the road, but after the renovations this was replaced with a family of trolls made of wood and coiled rope.

== See also ==
- Helicoid
- List of tunnels in Norway
