= Flyaway (novel) =

1978 novel by Desmond Bagley

- First edition
- Author: Desmond Bagley
- Language: English
- Genre: Thriller novel
- Publisher: Collins
- Publication date: 1978
- Publication place: United Kingdom
- Media type: Print (hardcover and paperback)
- Pages: 318
- ISBN: 0-00-222236-1
- OCLC: 16476258
- Preceded by: The Enemy
- Followed by: Bahama Crisis

Flyaway is a first person narrative thriller novel by English author Desmond Bagley, first published in 1978. It introduces Max Stafford as protagonist, who would later appear in Bagley's novel, Windfall.

== Plot introduction ==
Max Stafford is owner and president of a security consultation company based in London, which specializes in corporate security and anti-industrial espionage. Although his company is successful, his marriage has collapsed, and work is starting to lose its luster.

Photocopy of a TWA Northrop Gamma 2D from Jane's All the World's Aircraft used by Max Stafford for identification of the missing aircraft

More on a whim, he decides to investigate the disappearance of minor accountant Paul Billson from one of his client firms. Billson's father, a famous aviator, had vanished in the 1930s on an air race from London to South Africa somewhere over the Sahara desert, and Billson had been obsessed for years with the desire to find out what had happened, and to dispel lingering slander that the disappearance had been staged as an insurance fraud.

Soon after Stafford starts to investigate, he is assaulted by men who attempt to “discourage” further investigation. Stafford's search takes him to Algiers, then the deep desert area around Tamanrasset in southern Algeria, and across the border into Niger. But he finds that he is not the only person looking for Billson and the missing Northrop Gamma. Other people, with tremendous resources are also searching – and will kill to prevent the truth of a 40 year old incident to emerge.
