= Domino Island =

Novel by Desmond Bagley

- First edition
- Author: Desmond Bagley
- Language: English
- Genre: Thriller
- Publisher: HarperCollins
- Publication date: 9 May 2019
- Publication place: United Kingdom
- Media type: Print (Hardcover & Paperback)
- Pages: 310 pgs
- ISBN: 978-0-00-833301-0
- Preceded by: Juggernaut

Domino Island is a first-person narrative novel written by English author Desmond Bagley, and was first published posthumously in 2019. Originally drafted in 1972, the novel was discovered by Philip Eastwood in 2017 among the author's archived papers at the Howard Gotlieb Archival Research Center in Boston, USA. Eastwood found a typed first draft with handwritten annotations by Bagley and his original editor, Bob Knittel. There was also correspondence between the two discussing plans for the second draft. The author and journalist Michael Davies acted as "curator" to bring the novel to publication.

HarperCollins first released news of the unpublished thriller on 12 October 2018 at the Frankfurt Book Fair (Frankfurter Buchmesse). It was published on 9 May 2019 with a cover quote from Lee Child – "Like a dream come true – an undiscovered Desmond Bagley novel... and it's a great one!". The paperback edition (2020) also featured a quote from Jeffrey Deaver, who described the book's protagonist Bill Kemp as "part James Bond, part Philip Marlowe, and all hero".

== Plot introduction ==
Bill Kemp, an ex-serviceman working in London as an insurance investigator, is sent to the Caribbean to determine the legitimacy of an expensive life insurance claim following the inexplicable death of businessman David Salton. His rapidly inflated premiums immediately before his death stand to make his young widow Jill Salton very wealthy. Once there, Kemp discovers that Salton's political ambitions had made him a lot of enemies, and local tensions around a forthcoming election are already spilling over into protest and violence on the streets. Kemp eventually realises that Salton's death and the local unrest are a deliberate smokescreen for an altogether more ambitious plot by an enemy in their midst.

== Bill Kemp continuation novels ==
In 2023, to mark the centenary of Bagley's birth, HarperCollins published a 'sequel' to Domino Island featuring the same protagonist, Bill Kemp. Entitled Outback and billed as "The Desmond Bagley Centenary Thriller", the novel was written by Michael Davies, who had completed Domino Island for publication.

A month before Outback was published, HarperCollins announced they had signed a third Bill Kemp novel from Davies, to be set in the Austrian Alps and entitled Thin Ice. It was published in November 2024.
