= Svetogorsk =

Town in Leningrad Oblast, Russia

Svetogorsk Светогорск
- Town
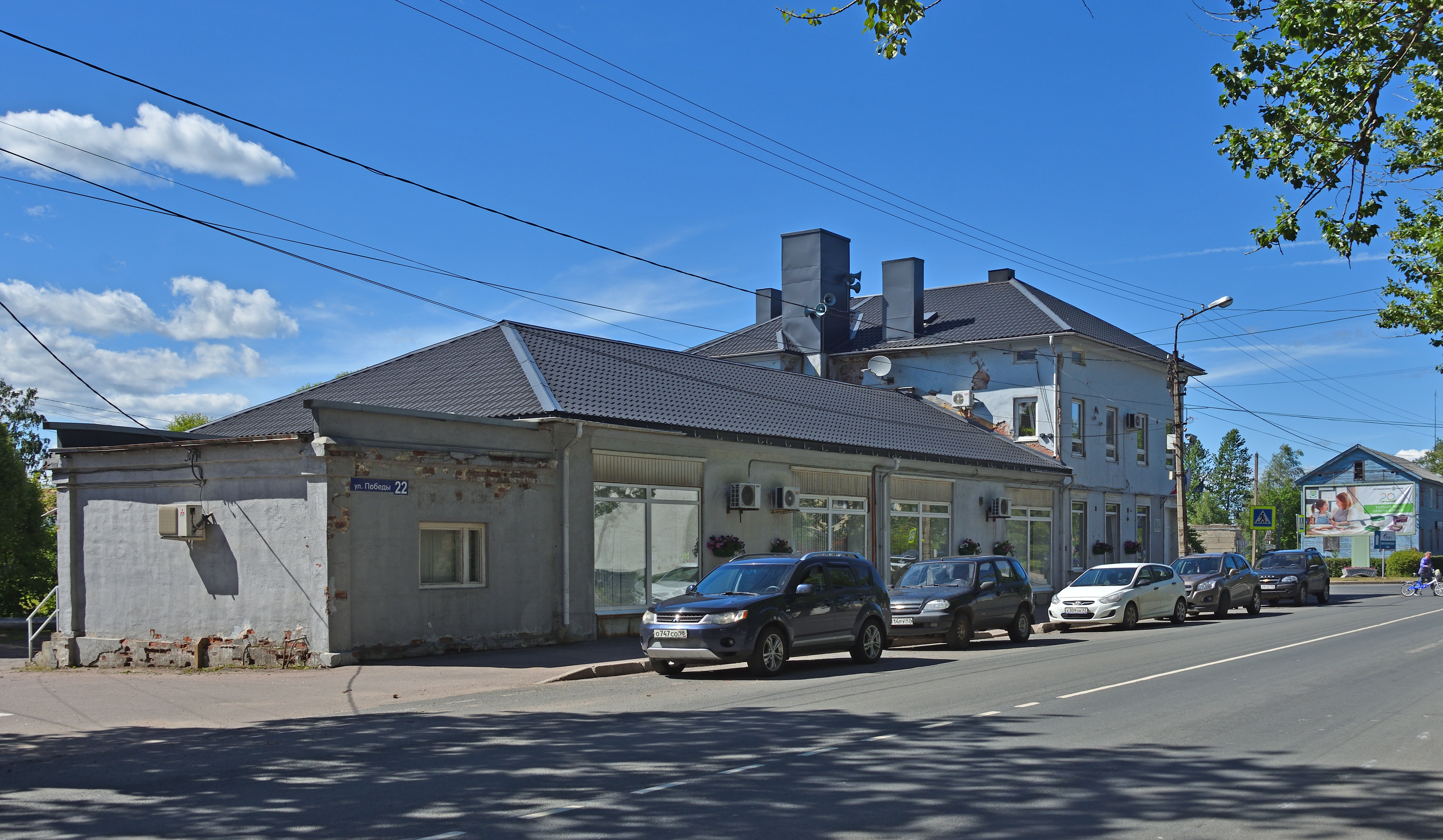

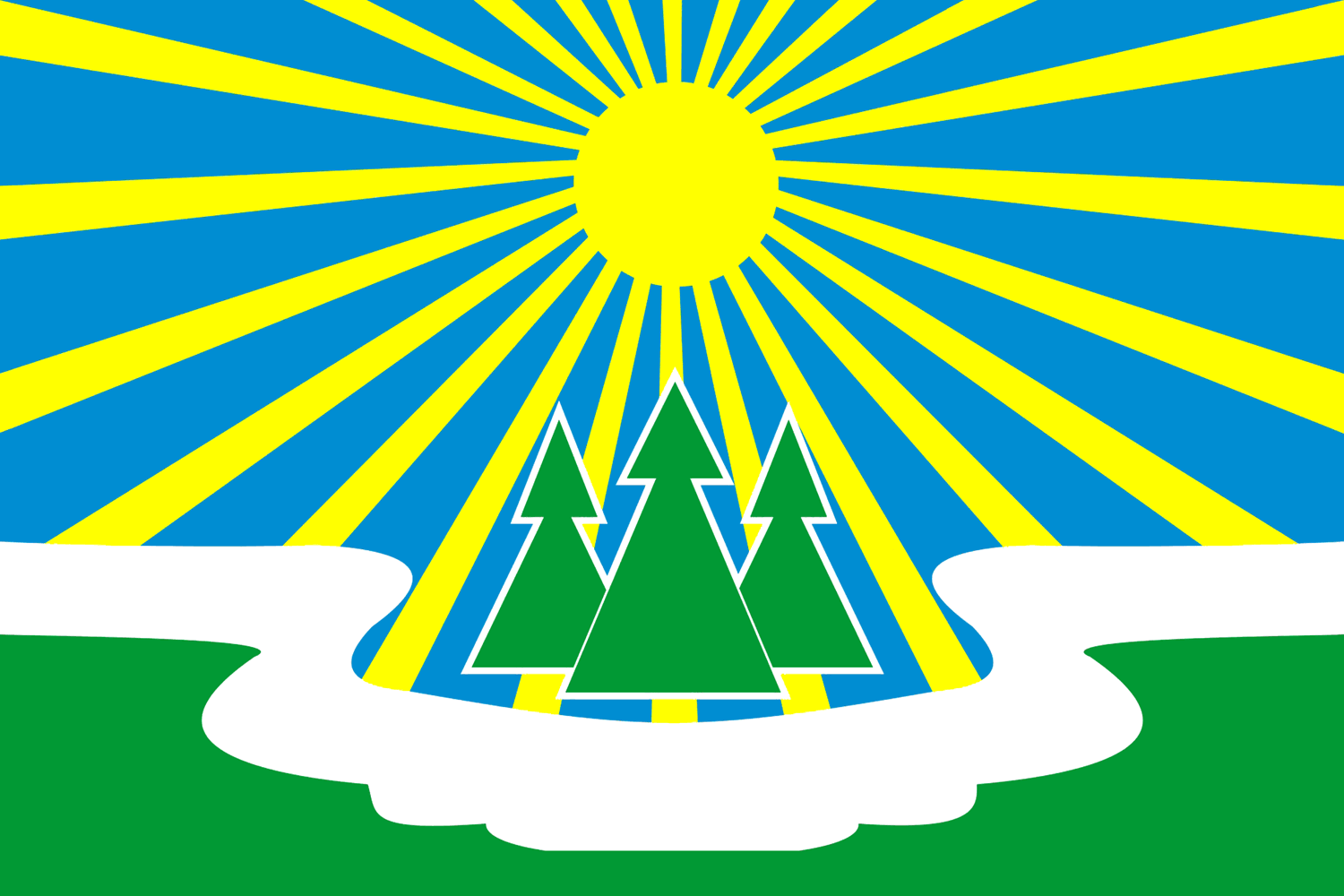
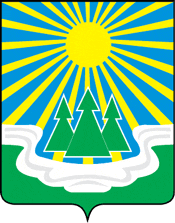
- Flag Coat of arms
- Interactive map of Svetogorsk
- Location of Svetogorsk Svetogorsk (Leningrad Oblast)
- Coordinates: 61°07′N 28°51′E
- Country: Russia
- Federal subject: Leningrad Oblast
- Administrative district: Vyborgsky District
- Settlement municipal formationSelsoviet: Svetogorskoye Settlement Municipal Formation
- Founded: 1887

Government
  - Body: City Council of Deputies
- Elevation: 44 m (144 ft)

Population (2010 Census)
  - Total: 15,981
  - Estimate (2024): 13,419 (−16%)

Administrative status
  - Capital of: Svetogorskoye Settlement Municipal Formation

Municipal status
  - Municipal district: Vyborgsky Municipal District
  - Urban settlement: Svetogorskoye Urban Settlement
  - Capital of: Svetogorskoye Urban Settlement
- Time zone: UTC+3 (MSK)
- Postal code: 188990–188992
- Dialing code: +7 81378
- OKTMO ID: 41615114001
- Website: www.svetogorsk-city.ru

Svetogorsk (Russian: Светогорск, Finnish: Enso) is an industrial town in Vyborgsky District of Leningrad Oblast, Russia, located on the Karelian Isthmus, on the Vuoksi River. It is located one kilometre (0.62 mi) from the border with Finland, five kilometres (3.1 mi) from the Finnish town of Imatra, and 207 kilometers (129 mi) from St. Petersburg. Population: 15,981 (2010 census); 15,698 (2002 census); 15,594 (1989 Soviet census).

== History ==
Originally called Enso, the town was founded in 1887 to serve a paper mill. At the time, Enso was part of Viipuri Province and the Jääski Municipality in the Grand Duchy of Finland, which was an autonomous part of the Russian Empire. When Finland became independent in 1917, Enso remained part of Finland.

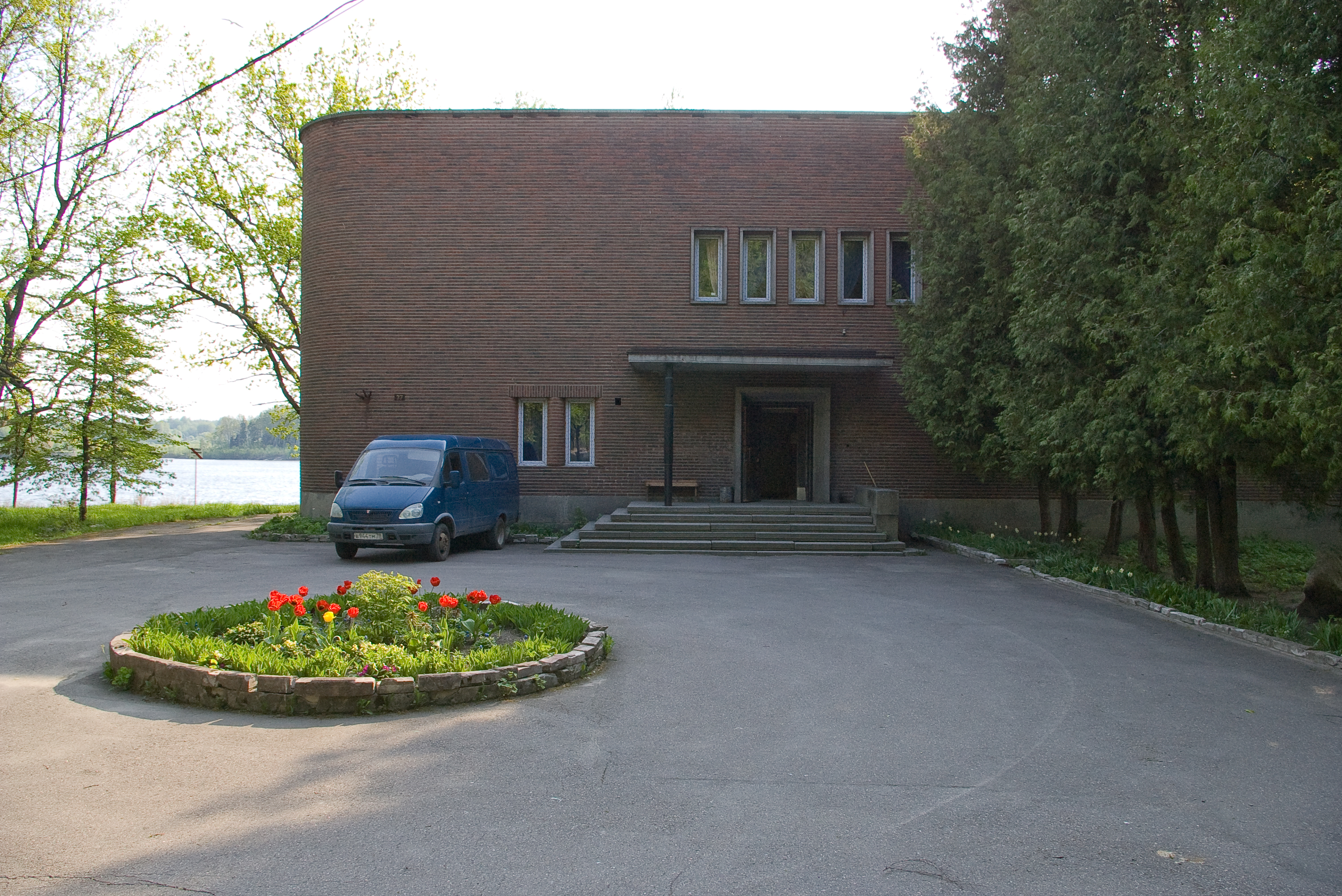
The Finnish villa (1930) at Kantorovicha Street

After the Winter War between Finland and the Soviet Union, the Finns and the Soviets disagreed on the interpretation of the peace treaty regarding Enso. The former Minister for Foreign Affairs of Finland Väinö Tanner wrote in his memoirs: "Already now a dispute about the district of Enso developed. According to the map attached to the peace treaty Enso was clearly intended to belong to Finland but the Russians claimed that it should belong to them. Later the map was redrawn according to the interests of the Russians so that the border bends at Enso."

In March 1940, Enso became a part of Yaskinsky District with the administrative center in the work settlement of Yaski. It was a part of the Karelian Autonomous Soviet Socialist Republic, after March 31, 1940 of the Karelo-Finnish Soviet Socialist Republic.

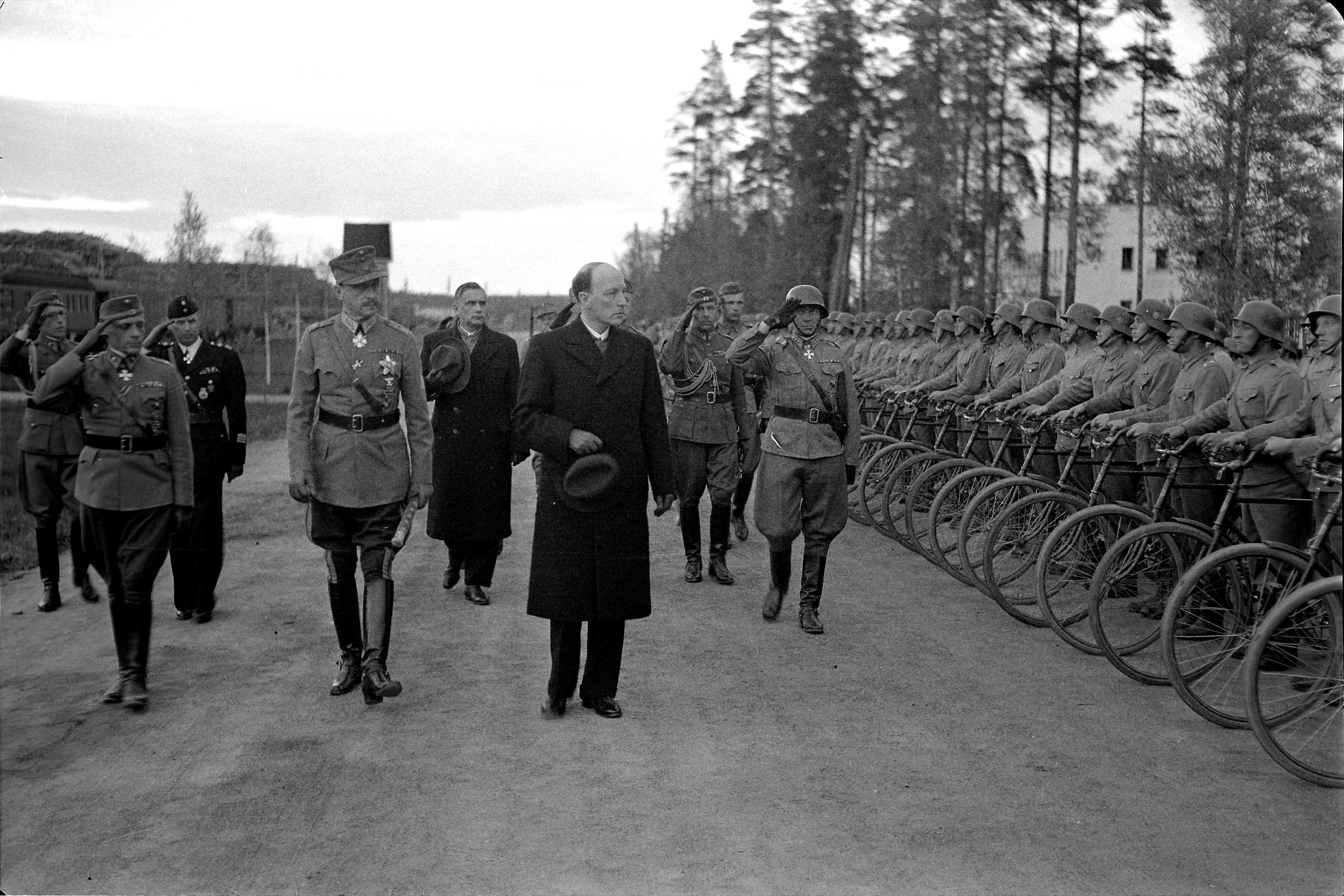
Carl Gustaf Emil Mannerheim, Marshal of Finland, and Risto Ryti, President of Finland in Enso on June 4, 1944

Enso was recaptured by Finns between 1941 and 1944 during the Continuation War but was again ceded to Soviets by the Moscow Armistice. This cession was formalized after signing the Paris Peace Treaty in 1947. The Finnish population was resettled to Finland, while migrants from Central Russia resettled the Karelian Isthmus.

On November 24, 1944, Yaskinsky District was transferred from Karelo-Finnish SSR to Leningrad Oblast. On October 1, 1948, the district was renamed Lesogorsky and on January 13, 1949, all Finnish names of the localities were replaced with Russian names. In particular, Enso was renamed Svetogorsk. On December 9, 1960, Lesogorsky District was abolished and merged into Vyborgsky District.

In 1972, the Soviet Union awarded Finland a construction project for a large new cellulose and paper mill in Svetogorsk. The project was paid with Soviet crude oil. The project also gave a start to cross-border relations. Notably, the construction workers in Svetogorsk were called "builders", and the project also had intent to "build friendship between peoples".

On April 18, 2008, about five hundred inhabitants of Svetogorsk participated in a protest which included a road barricade on the Finnish–Russian border as a protest against poor road conditions and lack of investment in road improvement at both federal and municipal level. According to the Finnish public service broadcaster Yle, the militia participated in effectively cutting off through traffic. The main issue of discontent was the lack of a bypass, which, according to reports, should have already been built.

== Administrative and municipal status ==
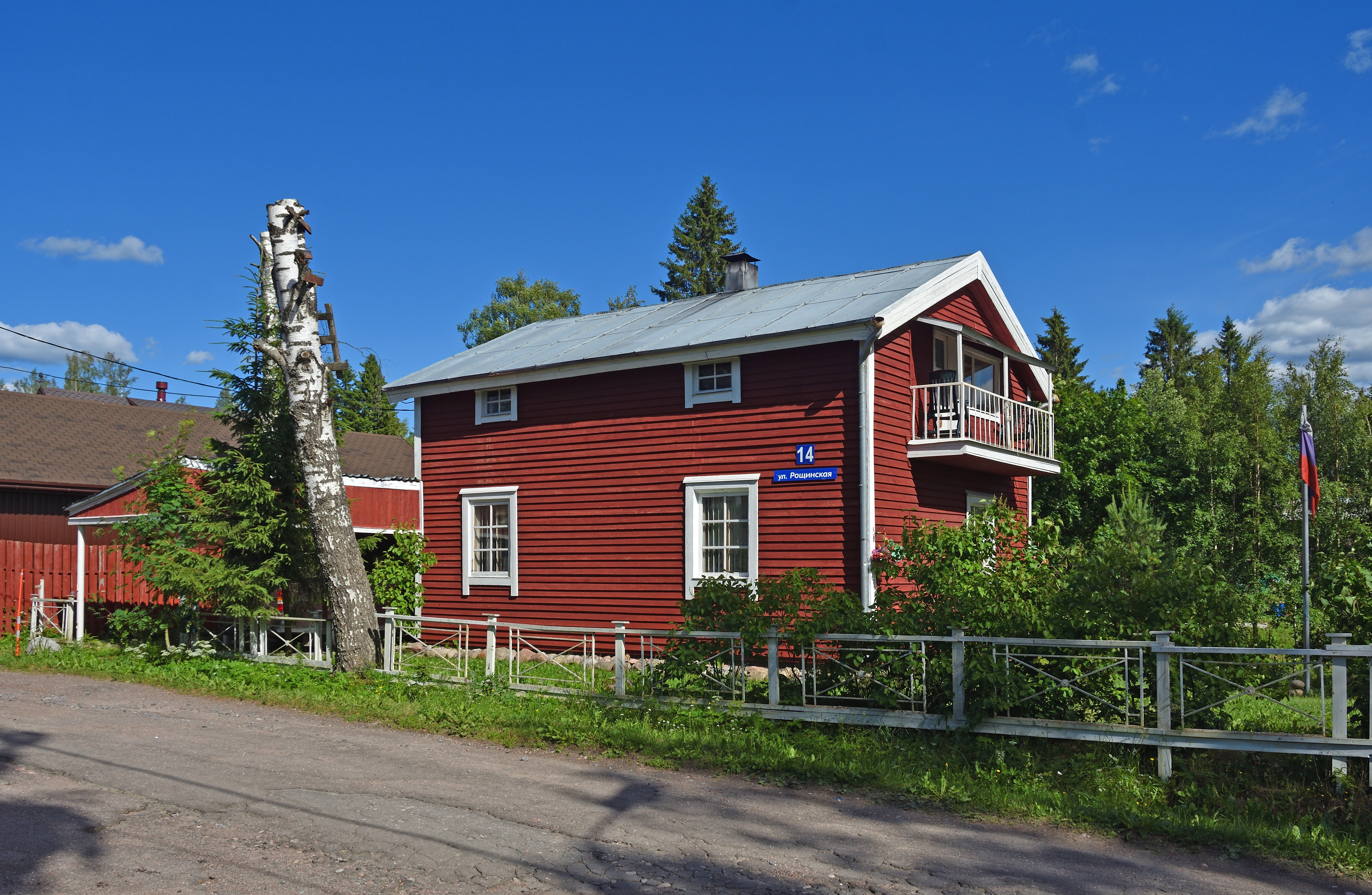
Wooden house in Svetogorsk

Within the framework of administrative divisions, it is, together with the urban-type settlement of Lesogorsky and two rural localities, incorporated within Vyborgsky District as Svetogorskoye Settlement Municipal Formation. As a municipal division, Svetogorskoye Settlement Municipal Formation is incorporated within Vyborgsky Municipal District as Svetogorskoye Urban Settlement.

== Economy ==
=== Industry ===
Before the Winter War, the town was a major factory site for Enso-Gutzeit Oy, the Finnish pulp and paper company (now Stora Enso). In the 1940 Moscow Peace Treaty, the new Finnish-Soviet border was deliberately drawn to leave the factory complex on the Soviet side. The town's major industry is still pulp and paper.

OAO Svetogorsk, one of the biggest paper mills in Russia, is the major employer. Covering 2 square kilometers (0.77 sq mi), OAO Svetogorsk produces pulp, printing paper, and packaging board. Its brands include Svetocopy and Ballet office paper. Since December 1998, OAO Svetogorsk has been majority owned by International Paper. At end of 2001, the plant employed 3,000 people; by 2008 this had fallen to 2,200.

Immediately adjacent to OAO Svetogorsk is a tissue mill. This formed part of the original mill complex but was split-away and resold by International Paper to SCA during the acquisition of OAO Svetogorsk from Tetra Laval, which controlled the plant since 1995. Svetogorsk Tissue, as the separate entity was to be called, became fully integrated into SCA Hygiene Products Division in 2003 (called Essity since 2017). It employs around four hundred people. Its products include Zewa and Tork brands of paper towels and toilet paper.

=== Border crossing ===
The Imatra–Svetogorsk border crossing plays a key role in the transportation of timber between Russia and Finland. Also, around 150 employees commute daily from Imatra to the paper mills. The border crossing, which had temporary status, was a bottleneck causing frequent delays due to lengthy customs checks and inadequate facilities. A Russia-Finland agreement in 1997 allowed the development and eventual permanence of the border crossing. This €7 million European Union TACIS-funded project ran from 1999 and the new international frontier, capable of handling 1,300 cars per day, opened on July 3, 2002.

=== Transportation ===
Svetogorsk is connected by railway with Kamennogorsk, where it has connection to the old Vyborg–Joensuu railroad. There is suburban traffic to Vyborg. The continuation of the railroad beyond Svetogorsk to the Finnish–Russian border is disused.

Svetogorsk is connected by roads with Kamennogorsk and Vyborg, as well as with Imatra across the border.

== In fiction ==
Svetogorsk is a key location in Desmond Bagley's 1973 novel The Tightrope Men.

== Sister city ==
Svetogorsk has one sister city:

- Imatra, Finland
