= Bagley Park =

Municipal park in Hillsboro, Oregon

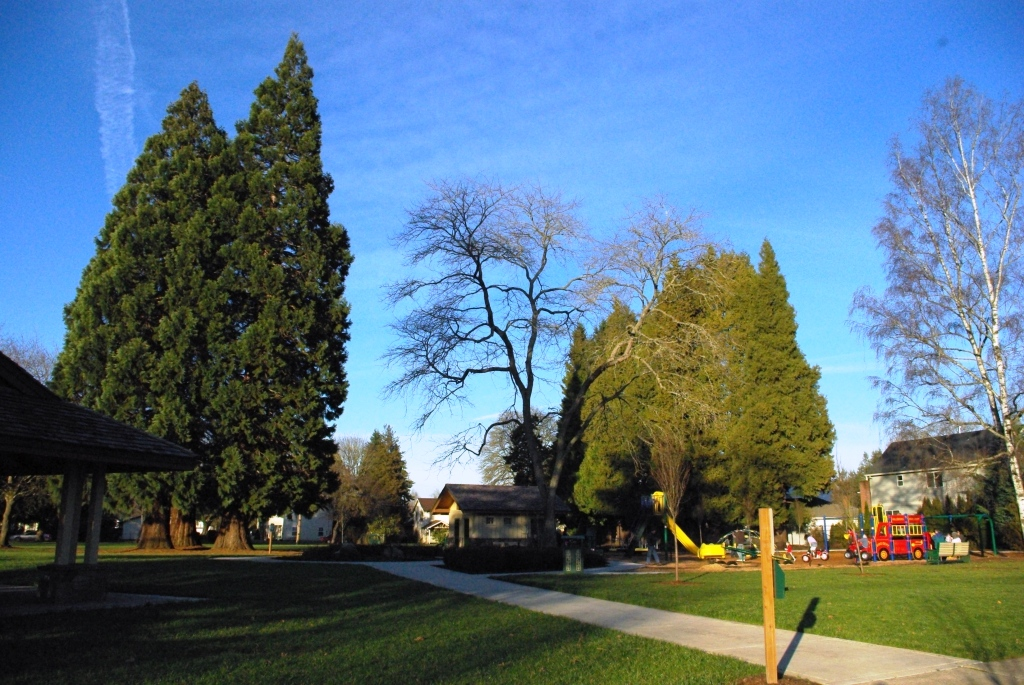
- Play equipment and trees in 2009
- Interactive map of Bagley Park
- Type: Public, city
- Location: Hillsboro, Oregon; United States
- Coordinates: 45°31′33″N 122°59′14″W
- Area: 2 acres (8,100 m^{2})
- Created: 1926
- Operator: Hillsboro Parks & Recreation Department
- Status: Open
- Website: Bagley Park

Bagley Park is a two-acre municipal park in downtown Hillsboro, Oregon, United States. Opened in 1926, the park covers a half-block at northeast Second Avenue and Jackson Street north of the Washington County Courthouse. After a major renovation project ending in 2008, the park includes a picnic shelter, a playground, restrooms, and several sports facilities.

== History ==
County circuit court judge George R. Bagley sold part of his land to the city for a park at the intersection of northeast Second and Jackson streets in the early 1920s. After paying Bagley $1, the city built a half-block park on the site in 1926. This was Hillsboro's second city park after Shute Park. The park was dedicated to Bagley in the early 1930s and had a baseball diamond.

In 1949, donations paid for the addition of playground equipment at the park. Funds were raised through a variety of means, including a ten-act circus from the American Legion staged at Shute Park's pavilion in May 1949. Also that year, voters approved a tax levy to provide for city residents to use school district facilities and fund a summer program at Bagley Park.

Hillsboro's Active 20-30 Club announced plans to refurbish the park in May 1985. The project was to be paid for in part through a newspaper drive. In 1986, the club began the refurbishment project that lasted three years. The group replaced the jungle gym, built a fence, installed a basketball court, built a sidewalk through the park, and cut down diseased trees. They also paid the city to add sidewalks around Bagley. In all, in excess of $25,000 and 1,000 hours of work were expended on the improvements. For a time the park was the starting point for the annual Lil Spooks Parade. The parade was also a costume contest held around Halloween and sponsored by the Active 20-30 Club, and continued until the late 1990s at Bagley.

In 1996, during zoning changes to increase population density in downtown brought about due to the construction of the Westside light rail, the city protected the area facing the park from increased densities. Bagley was closed by the city for four months starting in August 2007 for an overhaul of the facilities. This started a two-year, $400,000 project to repair and improve the park, with approximately $266,000 of the work paid for by the federal government. On September 17, 2008, the park was re-dedicated after improvements to the restrooms, play equipment, and the addition of a picnic shelter among other projects. The park has also hosted Easter egg hunts in the past.

== Amenities ==
Bagley is a half-block neighborhood park covering two acres in downtown Hillsboro. The park stretches along Second Avenue between Jackson and Edison streets two blocks north of the Washington County Courthouse and one block north of the Zula Linklater House. Facilities at the park include an ADA compliant restroom, sidewalks, a picnic shelter, and play equipment for children featuring seesaws, slides, a merry-go-round and others. There is also a basketball court and softball field. Natural features at the park include cottonwood trees as well as three large redwood trees, landscaping, and grass lawns.
