= Paxcroft Mead =

Place in Wiltshire, England

Coordinates: 51°19′23″N 2°11′06″W

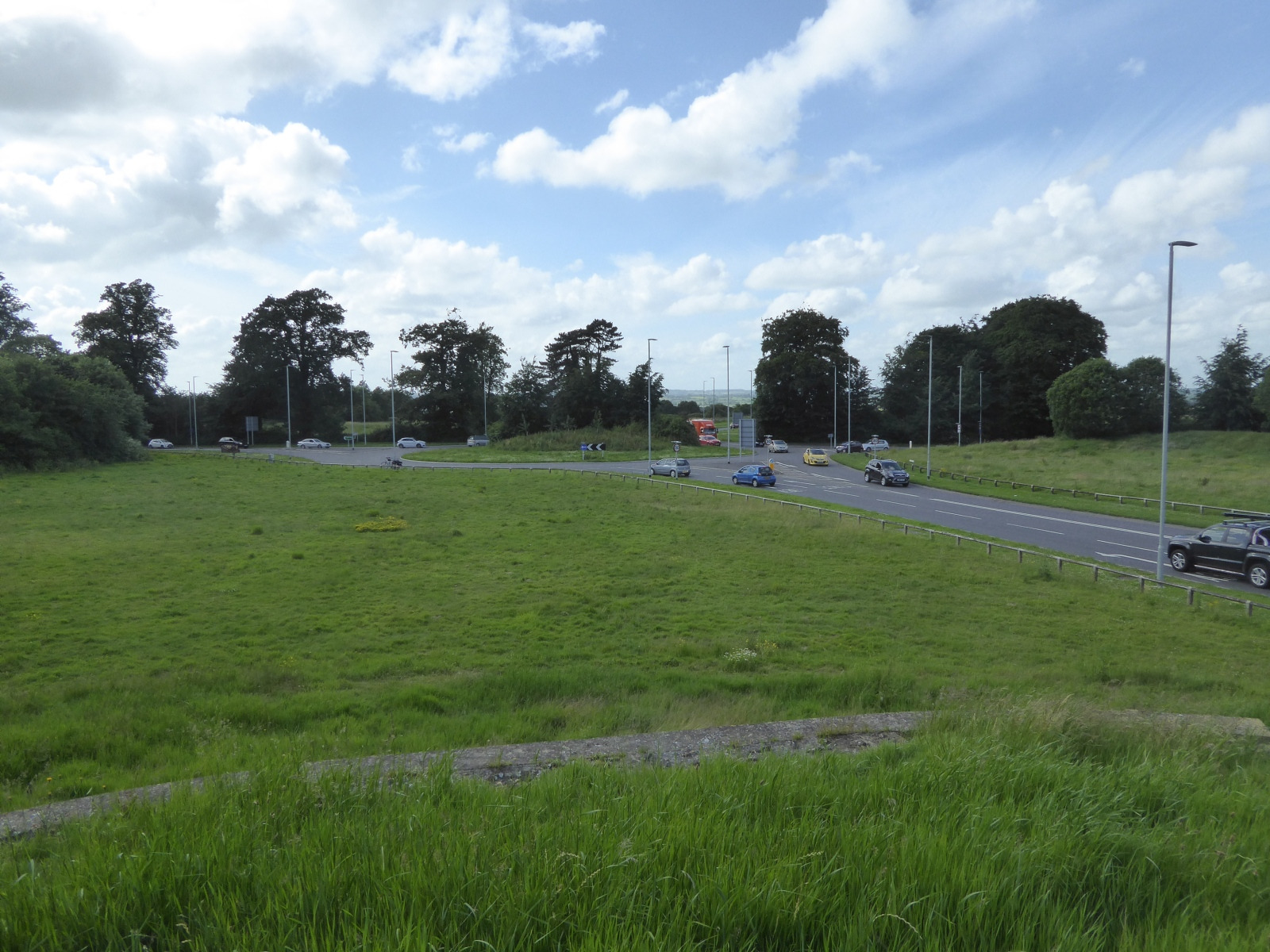
- A361 roundabout from Paxcroft Mead

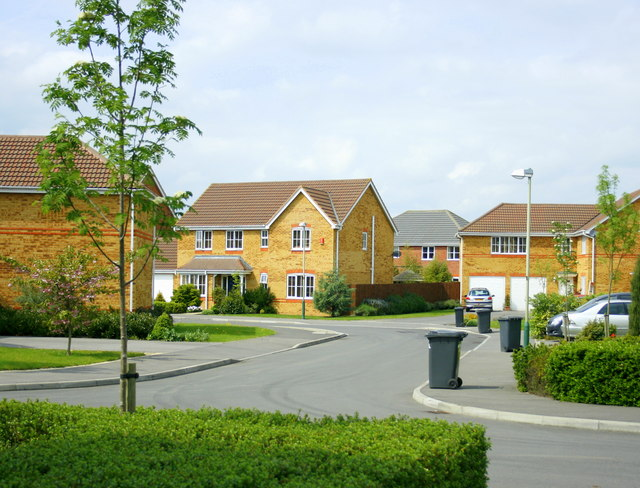
- 2000s housing near Green Lane Farm

- Location within Wiltshire
- OS grid reference: ST856579
- Unitary authority: Wiltshire
- Ceremonial county: Wiltshire
- Region: South West
- Country: England
- Sovereign state: United Kingdom
- Post town: TROWBRIDGE
- Postcode district: BA14
- Dialling code: 01225
- Police: Wiltshire
- Fire: Dorset and Wiltshire
- Ambulance: South Western
- UK Parliament: South West Wiltshire

Paxcroft Mead is a suburb of the town of Trowbridge, Wiltshire, England.

== History ==
The Paxcroft Mead Estate is east of the town centre. In the late 1990s the large housing development was built south of Hilperton.

In 2010, there were proposals for a BMX track to be built in the area. In 2020, a wildflower trial began in the local playing fields.

== Transportation ==
The A631 road is located north of Paxcroft Mead.

== Community facilities ==
Paxcroft Mead Community Centre.

== See also ==
- List of places in Wiltshire
