= The Freedom Trap =

1971 novel by Desmond Bagley

- Cover of first hardcover edition
- Author: Desmond Bagley
- Language: English
- Genre: Thriller Novel
- Publisher: Collins
- Publication date: 1971
- Publication place: United Kingdom
- Media type: Print (Hardcover & Paperback)
- Pages: 246 pgs
- ISBN: 1-84232-050-5
- OCLC: 59567002
- Preceded by: Running Blind
- Followed by: The Tightrope Men

The Freedom Trap is a novel written by English author Desmond Bagley, and was first published in 1971 with a cover by Norman Weaver. It was loosely based on the escape of George Blake from prison five years before. In 1973, it was made into a film entitled The Mackintosh Man, starring Paul Newman.

== Plot ==
Joseph Rearden is a better-than-average crook from South Africa with a jail conviction on his record. In London, he is hired by a man known only as Mackintosh, assisted by his secretary Mrs Smith, to steal a consignment of diamonds. The theft is successful but Reardon is almost immediately arrested. At his trial, his refusal to name his accomplice or even to admit his guilt leads to a sentence of 20 years in prison.

Reardon spends over a year in prison before hearing about an organisation named the "Scarperers" who can arrange a prison break for those who can afford it. He requests their help and eventually is contacted, with the proviso that he assists another prisoner, Slade, serving 40 years for espionage. Reardon and Slade are sprung from prison and taken to an unknown location until the heat dies down. Slade is then taken away and Reardon is confronted by the Scaperers who accuse him of not being who he claims he is.

It is then revealed that Reardon is really Owen Stannard, a semi-retired British Intelligence agent, and Mackintosh is a senior member of British Intelligence. Mackintosh is anxious that Slade does not escape to his native Russia, and also wants to break the Scaperers' network. He recruits Stannard to carry out a genuine crime in order to place him in prison with Slade, hoping to have the Scarperers break them out, previous attempts at planting "fake" criminals having been unsuccessful due to the Scarperers thorough vetting procedures.

Stannard escapes from the Scarperers' confinement, a house in the west of Ireland, and attempts to contact Mackintosh. He speaks instead to Mrs Smith, who informs him that Mackintosh has been injured in a hit-and-run accident. She flies to Ireland and she and Stannard piece together the theory that behind the Scarperers is Sir Charles Wheeler, an Albanian-born but naturalised UK citizen who is highly placed in the UK government. Wheelan plans to deliver Slade to the Chinese communist government, taking him to Albania in his private yacht.

Stannard and Mrs Smith follow Wheeler's trail to Malta. During their journey she reveals that she is Mackintosh's daughter, Alison, and that she is a highly trained espionage agent. Stannard also realises that Mackintosh deliberately revealed details of the operation to Wheeler to force his hand, resulting in the attempt to kill him. He and Alison begin to get romantically involved.

After an unsuccessful attempt to abduct Slade from Wheeler's yacht, Stannard and Alison decide instead to destroy the yacht, ramming it with a speedboat full of fireworks, igniting the yacht's fuel tanks. The plan succeeds, killing Slade and Wheeler, although Stannard is severely wounded.

After the event, Stannard is visited in hospital by a senior civil servant who tells him that Mackintosh has died, leaving behind full details of the operation. Alison also visits him and rejects Stannard's proposal of marriage but agrees to take a vacation with him, leaving Stannard hopeful for the future.

== References to previous works ==
Bagley carried over the Slade character from Running Blind.
