= The Golden Keel =

1963 novel by Desmond Bagley

- First edition
- Author: Desmond Bagley
- Language: English
- Genre: Thriller novel
- Publisher: Collins
- Publication date: 1963
- Publication place: United Kingdom
- Media type: Print
- OCLC: 59784625
- Followed by: High Citadel

The Golden Keel is the debut novel by English author Desmond Bagley, first published in 1963. Written in the first person narrative, the introductory biography of the protagonist is closely patterned after that of the author.

== Plot introduction ==
Peter Halloran, a migrant to South Africa after the end of World War II is a successful and profitable designer and builder of yachts and small watercraft. Life is good – business is good, and he has a beautiful wife and daughter. One day, in the local yacht club bar, he meets Walker, an alcoholic ex-soldier, who tells him an improbable tale of a hidden treasure. Walker was a prisoner of war in Fascist Italy, but escaped with a small band of Allied prisoners, including an Afrikaner named Coertze and some Italian partisans, and waged a guerilla campaign for several months in the hills of Liguria against the Nazi Germans. Toward the end of the war, their band ambushed a truck convoy, which contained a massive treasure in gold bars, jewels, and the State Crown of Ethiopia. Rather than turn the treasure over to the authorities, they hid the trucks in an abandoned mine and sealed the entrance. Now, with the war over, the treasure is for the claiming, provided they can smuggle it past Italian customs.

Halloran thinks little of the tale until several years later, after life turns sour. His wife killed in a traffic accident, he needs a change. A chance re-encounter with Walker leads to a meeting with Coertze, and with the three men agreeing to a partnership to recover the treasure. Walker and Coertze know where it is, and Halloran has the perfect solution to getting it out of the country. But questions worry Halloran – why are only Walker and Coertze survivors of the much larger group of guerillas, and why is Walker terrified of Coertze? The mystery deepens as the men travel to Tangiers, thence to ports around the Mediterranean, their steps dogged by unsavory characters. It is soon clear they are not the only group after the treasure.

This tale was inspired by the true story of the Flight of the Norwegian National Treasury, the smuggling of their gold reserves out of Norway during the Second World War.
