= Landslide (novel) =

1967 novel by Desmond Bagley

- First edition
- Author: Desmond Bagley
- Language: English
- Genre: Thriller
- Publisher: Collins
- Publication date: 1967
- Publication place: United Kingdom
- Media type: Print (hardback & paperback)
- Pages: 274 pgs
- ISBN: 1-84232-014-9
- Preceded by: Wyatt's Hurricane
- Followed by: The Vivero Letter

Landslide is a first-person narrative novel written by English author Desmond Bagley, and was first published in 1967.

== Plot summary ==
This story revolves around the protagonist, Bob Boyd, who is a geologist and works in British Columbia timber country. He has no memory of his past following a terrible car accident. At the start of the novel he arrives in a small town – Fort Farrell, located in northeastern British Columbia to perform a small job for the Matterson Corporation.

By chance he happens to see the name of the square in the town – Trinavant Square, which brings back some memories to him. After consulting the town newspaper he confirms that this is the place where John Trinavant used to live. He learns from a local reporter, McDougall (Mac) that John Trinavant used to be a big businessman in Fort Farrell about ten years ago with the elder Matterson – 'Bull' Matterson. However at that time John Trinavant had died in an auto crash along with his son (Frank) and wife. There was a fourth person found in the car driven by the Trinavants – Robert B. Grant who was presumed to be a hitchhiker travelling with them.

After meeting with the head of the Matterson Corporation, Howard Matterson (son of Bull Matterson), Bob plans to start a survey of the land owned by the Matterson Corporation in the nearby forest where the Mattersons were planning to build a dam and wanted to get their land surveyed for any precious minerals. Bob starts the survey and comes across a Miss Clare Trinavant who insists that he stays out of her land. After completing the survey he reports back to Howard that nothing of value lied below their land, and collects his pay-check and leaves. But before he leaves he is confronted by Mac to reveal his interest in the Trinavants. Although he refuses to tell Mac anything he is forced to reconsider his decision.

Bob thinks about his past. It is revealed that Bob Boyd is indeed none other than Robert Grant who was riding with the Trinavants when the car crashed and the other 3 occupants died. Although he survived the crash his body was badly burned and as a result he lost his memory. He is told by the doctor and the psychiatrist (Susskind) that he is Robert Grant and survived the crash. Susskind urges him to forget about his past and focus on the future. But Bob insists on knowing about his past and so Susskind tells him that he used to be a college student and had a broken family and criminal history. He had no family now and was sought by police for drug and other charges. Susskind tells him that he must forget all that and study and complete his university exams because he was a new person now. Susskind helps him get a new face by plastic surgery and they decide to give him a new name – Bob Boyd. After a little time Bob is able to go back to normal life and works in the northern Canadian territories as a prospector.

Back in the present time, Bob Boyd receives news that Susskind had died and feels that he has lost all touch with his past except for Fort Farrell and decided to go back there and investigate. He goes back and meets Mac and tells him everything about his past after which Mac feels sorry for having reprimanded him previously. They decide that to stick together and investigate the Mattersons interest and involvement in Trinavant property especially since after the death of the Trinavant family the Mattersons had gained a lot of wealth. They also decide to contact Clare Trinavant, who is a distant niece of John Trinavant and inform her about Bob's past. At this time, Mac asks Bob how he knows he is Robert Grant. In other words, he could not also be Frank Trinavant. Mac reveals to Bob that both Bob and John were boys of same age and a mistake could have been made. If Bob were actually Frank Trinavant he would stand to gain a lot of wealth and this would upset the Mattersons a lot.

After hearing this Bob starts to spread the word in Fort Farrell that he is the survivor of the crash in which the Trinavant family died to see the reaction of the Mattersons. Immediately he is called by the elder Matterson (Bull) and accused of blackmail. Bull inform him that he knows Bob is actually Robert Grant and could get him thrown in jail because of his past criminal record. Bull warns Bob to leave town immediately and not create any trouble, but Bob ignores him and tells him he can do nothing.

Meanwhile, Bob asks Clare her if he can survey her share of the land adjoining the Matterson's dam because it would be flooded soon. They both go there together and survey the land. While camping together they develop a romantic interest and decide to get married sometime in the future. When they return from the survey Bob decides to create some more panic for the Mattersons. He decides to visit the dam they are building and starts to poke around to provoke them. He also collects some soil samples near the dam and finds they contain quick clay. He tries to warn the Mattersons to stop building the dam lest it gets toppled due to the quick clay; instead, the Mattersons threaten him. Eventually he confronts Bull Matterson and tells him that he could also be John Trinavant. Bull is unable to hear this shocking news and gets a heart-attack. His son, Howard, spreads the rumour that Bob had hit Bull, and gets all his employees to hunt down Bob.

Bob quickly learns of Howard's plan and escapes in the woods. They all follow him in the woods and Howard also captures Clare and Mac and locks them in his cellar. Bob knows that he must quickly escape his hunters and try to free Clare and Mac. He tries several manoeuvres in the forest and on one occasion tells one of Howard's men that he did not hit Bull Matterson.

Eventually, Bob is able to escape and reach the Matterson home where Bull is recuperating from his heart attack. Bull tells Bob that five years ago his son and daughter had taken his car and run down John Trinavant's car with the intent to kill him and his family. They did not want to see the more successful Frank be the successor of the Matterson-Trinavant business. A little time later Bob learns from the police that Howard is killed by police gunshots in the forest after he had killed one of the police officers. They also are able to free Clare and Mac from the cellar.

Bob races towards the Matterson dam and orders everyone to evacuate due to the danger of quick clay. In the ensuing evacuation the dam collapses and a few people die, but most of them are able to escape. At the end Bob and Clare get together and look forward to a new life together.

== Film adaptation ==
In 1992, Jean-Claude Lord directed a made-for-TV movie adaptation of the novel. It starred Anthony Edwards as lead character Bob Boyd, Melody Anderson as Clare Trinavant, Tom Burlinson Howard Matterson, and Joanna Cassidy as Lucy Matterson. It was released on VHS in 1992.
