= The Dagger of Kamui =

Book by Tetsu Yano

- Theatrical poster

カムイの剣 (Kamui no Ken)
- Genre: Adventure, historical, martial arts
- Novel series
- Written by: Tetsu Yano
- Illustrated by: Moribi Murano
- Published by: Kadokawa Shoten
- Imprint: Kadokawa Bunko
- Original run: 1984 – 1985
- Volumes: 5
- Anime film
- Directed by: Rintaro
- Produced by: Rintaro; Masao Maruyama; Satoru Ikegami; Haruki Kadokawa
- Written by: Mori Masaki
- Music by: Ryudo Uzaki
- Studio: Madhouse; Project Team Argos
- Licensed by: AnimEigo
- Released: March 9, 1985
- Runtime: 132 minutes
- Film comic
- Published by: Fujimi Shobo
- Imprint: Fujimi Comics
- Original run: January – March 1985
- Volumes: 4

The Dagger of Kamui (カムイの剣, Kamui no Ken) is a Japanese novel series by Tetsu Yano released by Kadokawa Shoten from 1984 to 1985.

The series was adapted in 1985 into an anime film directed by Rintaro and animated by Madhouse. The screenplay was adapted by Mori Masaki, and character designs were created by Moribi Murano, who also illustrated the novel series. Takuo Noda directed the animation, and the music was composed by Ryūdō Uzaki and Eitetsu Hayashi.

The story begins during the Bakumatsu period of Japan in the last years of the Tokugawa Shogunate. It continues through the pre-Meiji period and refers to historical events such as the Boshin War, including the involvement of foreign governments, the Naval Battle of Hakodate, and the Meiji Restoration. There are also references to historical figures such as Captain Kidd, Saigō Takamori, Andō Shōzan, Oguri Kozukenosuke (Tadamasa), Geronimo, and Mark Twain.

== Plot ==
Jirō, a young boy of Japanese and Ainu descent, is a foundling raised by a kindly innkeeper and her daughter in the village of Sai on the Shimokita Peninsula.

One evening, a shinobi kills Jirō's adoptive mother and sister while he is away. When he returns home, he finds their bodies and a strange dagger. The angry villagers accuse him of the murders, and rather than face a brutal crucifixion for the grave crime of parricide, Jirō escapes with the dagger. He encounters a Buddhist monk called Tenkai, who works for the Shogunate as an Oniwaban (Secret Police). Tenkai takes the boy to confront the man who supposedly killed his family and provokes him into delivering the killing blow. To cover his tracks, Tenkai has the village set ablaze, and the villagers are slaughtered. Tenkai takes Jirō to his temple on the island of Ezo, and has his subordinates Shingo and Sanpei train him in the ways of the Ninja. Years later, Jirō leaves to find answers to the mystery of his family and his father, Tarōza. Meanwhile, Tenkai has him followed.

Jirō comes across a group of Japanese men beating up an old Ainu man, and he quickly dispatches them. The old man dies of his injuries, but his son Uraka takes Jirō to his home village of Shinopirika-Kotan, unaware the old man's assailants are agents of Tenkai. At Kotan, the village elder recognizes Jirō's dagger as the Dagger of Kamui, which was originally owned by a former village chieftain. It was given to a Japanese ninja who married the chieftain's daughter, Oyaruru. Years later, Oyaruru returned to Kotan alone, but eventually left the village to live upriver by herself.

Jirō finds Oyaruru and learns she is his biological mother. She reveals that Tenkai dispatched Tarōza to the mountain Kamui Nupuri to find a rumored treasure large enough to keep the Shogunate in power. However, Tarōza broke all contact with Tenkai and married Oyaruru. When Tenkai caught up with them, he slashed the face of the infant Jirō and sent him floating downriver in their canoe. Tarōza fought Tenkai's men on the cliff above, but lost an eye to a primitive grenade and his sword arm to Hanzou, then appeared to fall to his death. Jirō comes to the horrifying realization that Tenkai had tricked him, and that the man he stabbed was his father. During their evening meal, Jirō and Oyaruru collapse from a paralysis potion supplied by Shingo, and Oyaruru is killed by Shingo with the Dagger of Kamui. Implicated in her murder, Jirō is imprisoned, but Uraka returns to help free him. Jirō finally realizes that Tenkai has been manipulating him for years into following his father's footsteps, searching for the treasure, and plans his revenge against Tenkai.

Traveling north, Jirō is befriended by the elderly Andō Shōzan and a young Ainu girl. She helps find secret instructions to find a great treasure which is hidden with the hilt of the sword of Kamui. However, Jirō is tracked down by three of Tenkai's formidable assassins, whom he defeats, but not before they kill Shouzan. The Ainu girl helps Jirō escape, but she kills herself when confronted by the following Tenkai. With the aid of the sailor Sam, Jirō books passage on Captain Drasnic's ship to the United States. Onboard, he is attacked by Oyuki, one of Tenkai's shinobi, but he defeats her. He then saves her from drowning, and they develop a strong bond. After arriving in America, Jirō, Sam, and Oyuki become separated, and Jirō travels on alone. Jirō befriends Chico, a French-born Indian woman, and shelters with her tribe. He then encounters Mark Twain on the way the Los Angeles, heading for the island of Santa Catalina, which is apparently the location of Captain Kidd's treasure.

Jirō eventually finds a small treasure on the island, but Tenkai and his shinobi have followed him there with Oyuki. Tenkai suddenly reveals that Sanpei is a Satsuma and an associate of Tarōza, who was also Oyuki's father, making her Jirō's half sister. Oyuki angrily stabs Tenkai through the heart with the dagger, although he manages to fatally wound her before he dies. Jirō then finds the real treasure below in a hidden cavern. Later, Chico reappears and shows Jirō a similar copy of the treasure's location. She reveals her real name is Julie Rochelle, the daughter of French spies also seeking the treasure, and that her father and Tenkai killed each other. Jirō now realizes that Tenkai has been using body doubles. He returns to Japan, where he uses Captain Kidd's treasure to help fund the overthrow of the Tokugawa shogunate by the combined Satsuma-Choushuu forces.

In 1869, at the Citadel of Hakodate, the Imperial Japanese Navy and Army closed in on the last remaining Shogunate rebels. After a massive naval bombardment, Jirō wanders through the rubble and bodies, eventually encountering Tenkai. They engage in battle, during which Jirō kills Tenkai by impaling him through his cranium with the dagger. Jirō leaves Hakodate as the Imperial forces capture the city, but not before paying a silent farewell to Sanpei and his master, the samurai Saigō Takamori.

== Characters ==
Jirō (次郎, Jirō)
Voiced by: Hiroyuki Sanada (Japanese); Toby Williams (English)
The half-Japanese, half-Ainu protagonist of the story and the son of Tarōza and Oyaruru. He was raised by Tarōza's wife, Tsuyu. After an unknown assailant murdered Tsuyu and her daughter Sayuri, the villagers no longer trusted Jirō and chased him from the village. He then began studying the ways of the ninja under the tutelage of Tenkai. As he grew to adulthood, Jirō gathered pieces to the mystery of the disappearance of his father, and he began to devise a trap to snare Tenkai. In later volumes of the novels, he adopts the name Jiroza Hattori (服部 次郎佐, Hattori Jirōza), as well as Gerome Kamui (ジローム・カムイ, Jirōmu Kamui), the name based on that of Geronimo, his adopted father.
Tenkai (天海)
Voiced by: Tarō Ishida (Japanese); Jack Marquardt (English)
A Buddhist monk and the top agent for the Bakufu (a member of the oniwabanshū), who was operating in the areas of northern Japan and Ezo controlled by the Matsumae clan. He claims to be an ordinary high priest who goes by the name of Tenkai-oshō. Through his Satsuma spy Tarōza, Tenkai learned of the mystery of Captain Kidd. After having Tarōza chased down and killed by Jirō, Tenkai began scheming to find and obtain the treasure of Captain Kidd. As he is the leader of a ninja clan, he uses many body doubles in order to avoid being killed himself. The character in the anime looks very much like Saigō Takamori; the reason for this is never explained.
Oyuki (お雪)
Voiced by: Mami Koyama (Japanese); Carrie Sakai (English)
A runaway ninja who is chasing after Jirō at the behest of Tenkai. She has the ability to split into four images of herself in order to confuse opponents. She is later revealed to be Jirō's half-sister.
Andō Shōzan (安藤昌山)
Voiced by: Ichirō Nagai
An elderly philosopher who shelters an injured Jirō. Because of his skill in understanding the English language, Shōzan deciphers Tarōza's notes and instructs Jirō to travel to America.
Chiomapp (チオマップ, Chiomappu)
Voiced by: Mitsuko Horie (Japanese); Rumiko Varnes (English)
Andō Shōzan's Ainu caretaker. After Jirō boards a ship to travel to America, Chiomapp takes her own life in front of Tenkai.
Captain Drasnic (ドラスニック船長, Dorasunikku Senchō)
Voiced by: Takashi Ebata
The captain of a ship that Jirō boards to travel to America. When Jirō defends himself and a stowaway Oyuki from Drasnic's crew, Drasnic has the two ninjas kicked out of his ship upon arriving in Alaska.
Sam (サム, Samu)
Voiced by: Kazuyuki Sogabe
Captain Drasnic's slave. Jirō buys Sam from Drasnic and makes him a freeman.
Chico (チコ, Chiko)
Voiced by: Yuriko Yamamoto
A Native American whom Jirō saves from being raped by outlaws. She learns from her adoptive father Geronimo that her real name is Julie Rochelle, and her father was François Rochelle, a French diplomat who had learned of the treasure of Captain Kidd before he was murdered by Tenkai.
Geronimo (ジェロニモ, Jeronimo)
Voiced by: Yasuo Muramatsu
An Apache chief and the adoptive father of Chico.
Mark Twain (マーク・トウェイン, Māku Towein)
Voiced by: Iemasa Kayumi
The famous American writer who befriends Jirō. Upon learning that Jirō is Japanese, he references Marco Polo's discovery of Zipangu.
Tarōza (太郎佐)
Voiced by: Michio Hazama
A ninja spy hired by Tenkai to find the treasure of Captain Kidd. During his mission, he fell in love with the Ainu woman Oyaruru, who gave birth to Jirō. Tarōza was hunted down by Tenkai's ninjas, who cornered him before the high priest had Jirō stab him in the heart. With his dying breath, Tarōza revealed himself to be Jirō's father.
Oyaruru (オヤルル)
Voiced by: Masako Ikeda
Jirō's Ainu birth mother. Upon learning of Jirō's birth, Tenkai scars the infant across the nose before driving him away on a river.

== Media ==
=== Novels ===
The Kadokawa bunkoban releases are as follows:

- Volume 1, February 1984, ISBN 978-4-04-140318-1
- Volume 2, February 1984, ISBN 978-4-04-140319-8
- Volume 3, Meiji Opens to the World (明治開国編, Meiji Kaikoku Hen), December 1984, ISBN 978-4-04-140320-4
- Volume 4, The Road to the World (世界への道編, Sekai e no Michi Hen), January 1985, ISBN 978-4-04-140321-1
- Volume 5, The Russian Southern Expansion Plan (ロシア南進策編, Roshia Nanshinsaku Hen), February 1985, ISBN 978-4-04-140322-8

The Haruki bunkoban release is as follows:

- Volume 1, February 1999, ISBN 978-4-89456-499-2

=== Video game ===
A video game was released for the NEC PC-88 in 1985.

=== American release ===
On October 2, 1987, an American home video company known as Celebrity Home Entertainment released The Dagger of Kamui on their Just for Kids VHS label in an English-dubbed version called Revenge of the Ninja Warrior. This release of the film was heavily edited, removing 22 of the 132 minutes of footage; the resulting cut ran 110 minutes. The uncut dub was later re-released by Best Film and Video Co. in 1995 under the title The Blade of Kamui.

The unedited version, in Japanese with English subtitles and bearing the title The Dagger of Kamui, was later released on VHS and DVD by AnimEigo.

=== Musical score ===
Ryudo Uzaki's score for the film is notable for combining rock music instrumentation with Balinese kecak vocals.

== Reception ==
Helen McCarthy in 500 Essential Anime Movies states that "with Madhouse and a stellar team of animators on board, the art and design are first class". She praises the "clever script", fluid animation and battle scenes, calling the film "a good old-fashioned epic".
