= The Spoilers (Bagley novel) =

1969 novel by Desmond Bagley

- First edition cover
- Author: Desmond Bagley
- Language: English
- Genre: Thriller
- Publisher: Collins
- Publication date: 1969
- Publication place: United Kingdom
- Media type: Print (Hardcover & Paperback)
- Pages: 292 pgs
- Preceded by: The Vivero Letter
- Followed by: Running Blind

The Spoilers is a novel written by English author Desmond Bagley, and was first published in 1969 with a cover by Norman Weaver.

== Plot introduction ==
When wealthy film tycoon, Sir Robert Hellier, loses his daughter to a heroin overdose, he declares war on the drug peddlers. He offers London drug treatment specialist, Nicholas Warren MD, unlimited financing to use his insider knowledge of the drug trade to smash the major international drug ring responsible. Initially reluctant, Warren is convinced by professional interest and personal circumstances to organise a team of friends and specialists who will use a combination of deceit and violence to infiltrate and bring down the drug ring, and to destroy a hundred million dollars' worth of heroin at its source in the Middle East.
