= Bahama Crisis =

1982 novel by Desmond Bagley

- First edition
- Author: Desmond Bagley
- Language: English
- Genre: Thriller novel
- Publisher: Collins
- Publication date: 1982
- Publication place: United Kingdom
- Media type: Print (hardcover and paperback)
- Pages: 250
- ISBN: 0-00-222358-9
- OCLC: 16552416
- Preceded by: Flyaway
- Followed by: Windfall

Bahama Crisis is a first-person narrative thriller novel by English author Desmond Bagley, first published in 1982. It was completed by May 1980 following a holiday with his wife in the Bahamas taken late in 1979.

== Plot introduction ==
Tom Mangan is a wealthy Bahamian, and owner/president of a company operating resort hotels, marinas and car rental companies in the Bahamas. His business is successful and growing, and he has a beautiful wife and two children. Things could not be better. One day, he is visited by an old friend from his college days at the Harvard Business School, Billy Cunningham, and his beautiful younger cousin Debbie. The Cunninghams are owners of the Cunningham Corporation, a major conglomerate based in Texas. The Cunningham Corporation wants to invest heavily in developing the tourist industry in the Bahamas, and Mangan agrees to form a partnership with them. However, soon afterwards, disaster strikes. The yacht with Mangan's wife and one of his daughters mysteriously disappears, and the body of his daughter washes up on a beach hundreds of miles from where the yacht should have been. A rash of mysterious events strike the tourist industry, ranging from an unprecedented labor dispute and riot, Legionnaires' disease striking the hotels, baggage carousels running amok at the airport, arson at an amusement center, and an oil slick from an oil tanker where it should not have been. As Mangan attempts to track down the murderer of his wife, he discovers that these seemingly unrelated events are all connected, and that the plot involves the future of the Bahamas itself as a nation.
