= Michael Davies (writer, born 1964) =

British author, playwright and journalist

Michael Davies (born 25 March 1964) is a British author, playwright, lyricist and journalist, also writing as M. R. G. Davies. After a career in regional newspapers he turned to fiction, winning a national award for his debut play and becoming a published author for the first time at the age of 59.

He is particularly associated with the works of the thriller writer Desmond Bagley, whose unpublished manuscript Domino Island was completed by Davies for publication 36 years after Bagley's death. Davies has subsequently written two sequels, Outback (2023) and Thin Ice (2024).

A new series of 'cosy crime' novels, under the umbrella title The Cosy Crime Club Mysteries, was commissioned by HarperCollins imprint One More Chapter for publication in early 2026, with Murder by the Book scheduled for January, A Game of Murder in March and From Murder With Love later in the year.

== Career ==
After leaving school, Davies trained as a newspaper reporter on the Northampton Chronicle and Echo. He spent the next two decades working on newspapers across the UK, including editing the Oxford Mail, before leaving full-time journalism in 2002 to focus on fiction.

== Writing ==
Davies's writing encompasses a wide variety of media. Having served as theatre critic for numerous publications during his career in newspapers, in 2008 Davies set up the website StageReviews.co.uk, which he continues to edit, as well as reviewing for whatsonstage.com and writing programme notes for theatres across the UK, as well as in the West End and on Broadway.

Davies's debut play, Rasputin's Mother, won what is now the Bristol Old Vic Playwriting Competition in 2012 and he has continued to write for the stage. Alongside the composer Michael Blore, he wrote the book and lyrics for Tess – The Musical, which was workshopped at the Royal Shakespeare Company's studio venue The Other Place in Stratford-upon-Avon, while his Shakespearean parody MacHamLear toured the UK and Ireland in a staging by Heartbreak Productions.

He has written narrative non-fiction for television including the Netflix series Meet, Marry, Murder and My Lover, My Killer.

In 2018 he was invited by Desmond Bagley's publishers HarperCollins to work on a manuscript that had been discovered in the Bagley archive in Boston, Massachusetts. His editing of the novel led to its publication the following year under the title Domino Island. The book's protagonist, Bill Kemp, was described by the American author Jeffrey Deaver as 'part James Bond, part Philip Marlowe and all hero', and Davies has subsequently written two further Kemp novels for HarperCollins, Outback (2023) to celebrate Bagley's centenary and Thin Ice (2024).

In late 2024, the HarperCollins imprint One More Chapter announced the acquisition of a new cosy crime series from Davies about The Quaint Bookshop's crime-solving reading group. The first three novels in the series – Murder by the Book, A Game of Murder and From Murder With Love – were scheduled for publication in 2026.
