= Night of Error =

1984 novel by Desmond Bagley

Night Of Error
- First edition
- Author: Desmond Bagley
- Language: English
- Genre: Thriller
- Publisher: Collins
- Publication date: 1984
- Publication place: United Kingdom
- Media type: Print (Hardcover & Paperback)
- Pages: 302 pgs
- ISBN: 0-00-222792-4
- OCLC: 43971653
- Preceded by: Windfall
- Followed by: Juggernaut

Night of Error is a First-person narrative novel written by English author Desmond Bagley, and was first published in 1984. The manuscript was completed in 1962; however, Bagley desired to make revisions and never pursued publication. After his death in 1983, the work was completed using revisionary notes he had left behind, and was published posthumously by his widow.

== Plot introduction ==
Mike Trevelyan, an English oceanographer, learns that his brother Mark, a marine biologist has died in suspicious circumstances while prospecting in the South Pacific. Although the two brothers were never very close, when an attempt is made to steal the few effects shipped back to the family, he decides to investigate.

The only clues - a notebook written in a code, and a lump of deep sea rock indicates that Mark may have stumbled onto a potentially lucrative deposit of manganese and cobalt - lead Mike to contact his father's old crew of ex-commandos, and with the backing of a Canadian tycoon to launch an expedition to investigate the death and to look for the rich mineral deposits the brother had apparently discovered.

The expedition soon faces both natural and unnatural disasters, as well as unexpected villains.
