= Bugmore =

Area of the city of Salisbury, Wiltshire, England

Coordinates: 51.064°N 1.792°W

Bugmore was an area of the city of Salisbury, Wiltshire, England, to the east of Exeter Street and south of St. Anns Street. It is now occupied by the Friary residential estate.

== History ==
The land was previously a boggy area which may have given rise to the name Bugmore or 'boggy moor'. The area has been thus named since the 13th century. In the 18th century the Bishop of Salisbury owned two meadows here called Greater Bugmore and Little Bugmore; these fields and their rent were the subject of some acrimony between the bishop and the city.

In 1623 a workhouse was established on the site, and when the new workhouse was built in Crane Street the Bugmore workhouse probably became a pesthouse because a pesthouse was ordered to be demolished in 1688. Lord Folkestone bought a piece of land there and built a house in 1763, which he then gave to the city as a smallpox hospital.

In 1874 the area was purchased by Salisbury City Council and became the site of a sewage processing plant and garden allotments. In the middle of the 20th century the sewage processing plant was replaced by one at Petersfinger and the site was developed in the 1970s as the Friary, a residential estate of social housing.
