= Zula Linklater House =

Historic house in Oregon, United States

- U.S. National Register of Historic Places
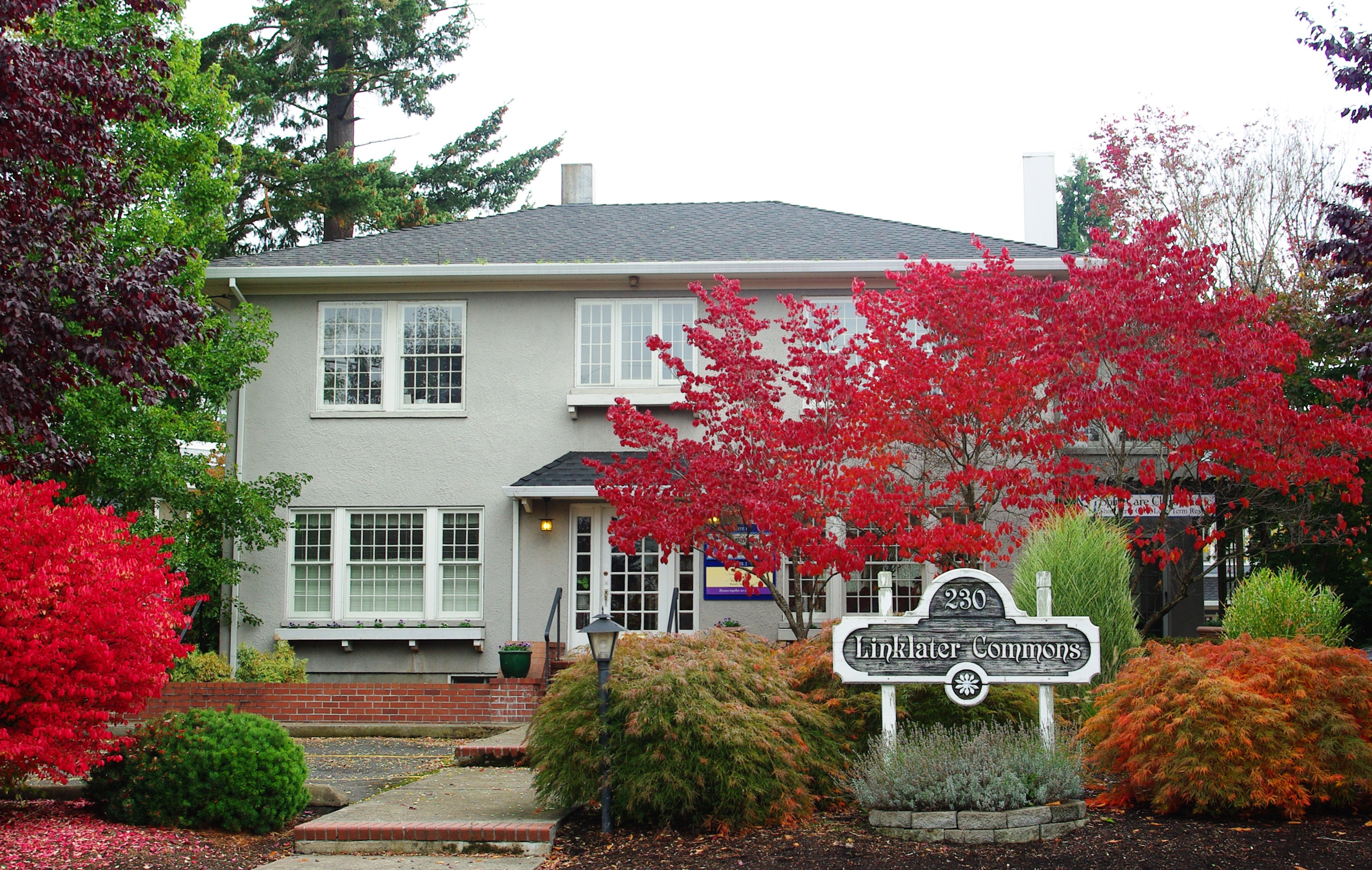
- West side of the building in 2009

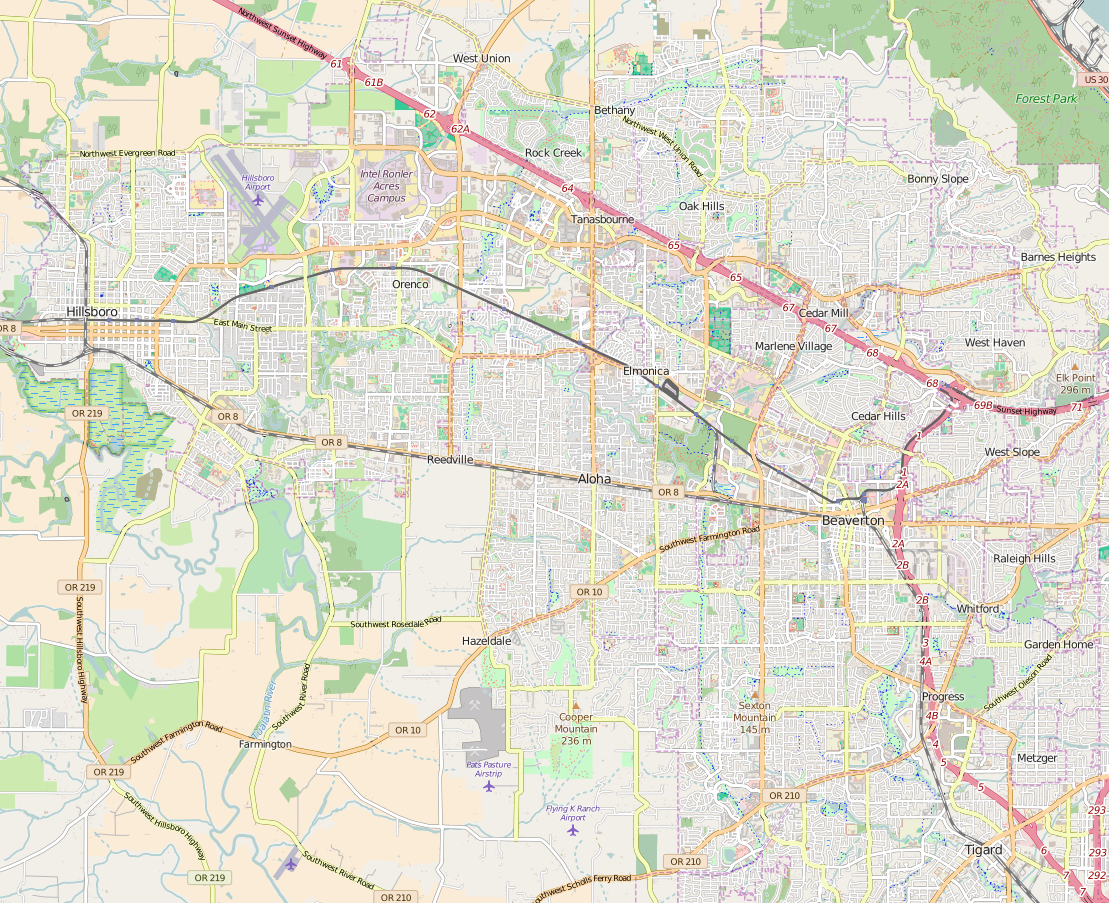
- Location within Hillsboro Beaverton OR
- Location: Hillsboro, Oregon, USA
- Coordinates: 45°31′27″N 122°59′15″W
- Built: 1923
- Architectural style: Mediterranean
- NRHP reference No.: 84003108
- Added to NRHP: August 1, 1984

The Zula Linklater House is a two-story office building on Second Avenue in downtown Hillsboro, Oregon, United States. Completed in 1923, the Mediterranean style structure is built of concrete, wood, and stucco. Originally constructed for Zula Warren Linklater as a home, it was renovated and turned into office space in 1984. The building was added to the National Register of Historic Places in 1984.

== History ==
Zula Warren was born on August 12, 1870, near Hillsboro with the family residence near what is today 10th Avenue and East Main Street. She married local doctor Samuel Towers Linklater after she turned 28 years old and would have six children with the widower. The husband died on February 8, 1914, with Zula using the family investments to support the family and build a new home.

Daughter, Ruth requested that her mother build a home "that would last forever." Construction began in 1922 on the house on a property Samuel had bought in 1889. The concrete dwelling was completed in 1923. On February 8, 1930, Zula died and the home passed to her son Kenneth. He lived there briefly, but never sold the home, with the residence changing ownership after his death in 1983. Kenneth married Jeanne Latourette, the daughter of Earl C. Latourette of the Oregon Supreme Court.

On August 1, 1984, the house was added to the National Register of Historic Places as the Zula Linklater House. That year contractor and developer Eugene Zurbrugg renovated the structure and converted it into office space. With it fully leased at the completion of the remodel, the conversion was seen as a beginning of a change to the building type in downtown Hillsboro from retail to a more commercial focus. As of 2008, the building housed professionals, including the Legal Aid office for Washington County.

== Details ==
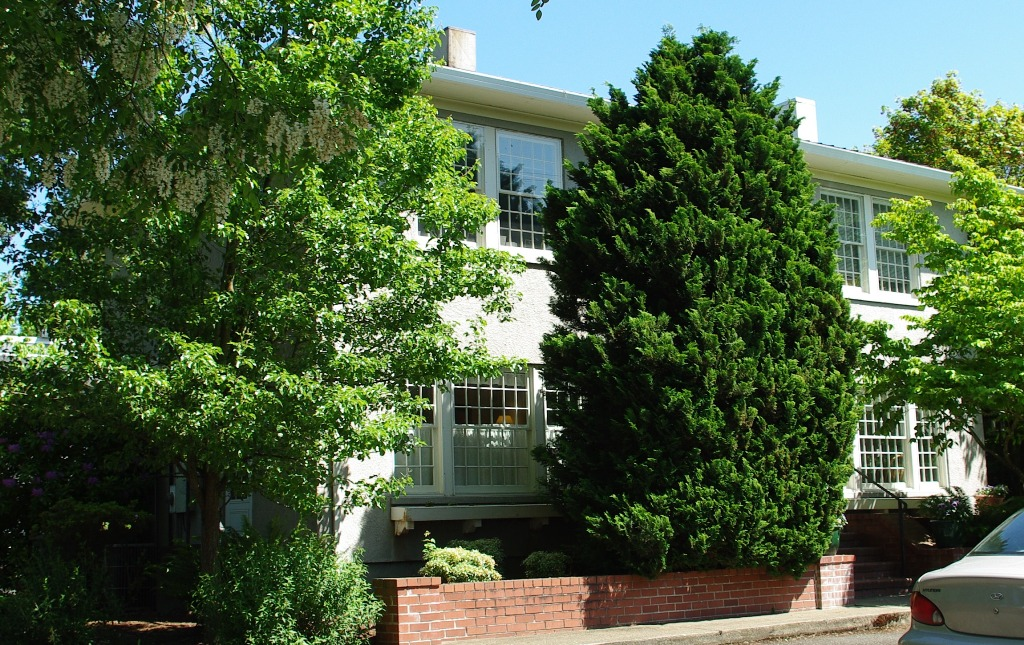
Front of building in 2008

The two-story, gray office building was built of wood, concrete, and featured a stucco exterior. It was the only home in Hillsboro constructed of concrete during the 1920s. The Zula Linklater House is of the Mediterranean Revival Style architecture popular at the time of its construction.
