= The Snow Tiger =

1975 novel by Desmond Bagley

- First edition
- Author: Desmond Bagley
- Language: English
- Genre: Thriller
- Publisher: Collins
- Publication date: 1975
- Publication place: United Kingdom
- Media type: Print (hardback & paperback)
- Pages: 296 pgs
- ISBN: 0-385-04841-6
- Preceded by: The Tightrope Men
- Followed by: The Enemy

The Snow Tiger is a novel written by English author Desmond Bagley, and was first published in 1975. The sub-title of the book quotes the ski pioneer Mathias Zdarsky: "Snow is not a wolf in sheep's clothing – it is a tiger in lamb's clothing".

== Plot introduction ==
This story revolves around the protagonist, Ian Ballard, who works as a mine manager. He is the grandson of Ben Ballard, owner of the Ballard Holdings Limited, a giant financial group based in London specialising in mining operations around the world. Ben had four sons including Ian's father. Ian's father and Ben had fallen apart when Ian's father left him to settle in the fictional town of Hukahoronui (a.k.a. Huka) located in the Two Thumb Range in the South Island of New Zealand in the late 1930s. Ian was born in 1939 and his father died very shortly afterwards in an avalanche there. After his father's death Ian and his mother continued to live in Huka until he is 16 years old. During this time he develops enmity with a local boy, Charlie Peterson, who is of his age group. It is revealed later in the story that when Ian was about 12 years old Charlie's twin brother Alec had drowned in the town river. Since Ian was present at the riverside Charlie held Ian responsible for Alec's death, even though in reality Ian was innocent.

At the start of the story Ian is about 35 years old and is injured when he gets trapped in a small avalanche while skiing in Switzerland along with his friend Mike McGill (who is an expert in the study of snow). Ian injures a leg during that accident. While recuperating in London at his mother's home he is visited by his grandfather, Ben, who offers him the job of managing director of a gold mine located in Huka which is indirectly controlled by Ballard Holdings. Although Ian's initial reaction is to decline the offer (due to his history at Huka with the Petersons), eventually he decides to take up the offer keeping in mind that Ben had supported him during all his education.

The story from this point is told in a flashback to a government hearing on the cause of an avalanche in Huka and its consequences. This avalanche occurred in July of the year Ian had arrived back in Huka, and the courtroom proceedings take place in December of the same year. Witnesses are called in this inquiry who recall their experience before, during and after the avalanche and the story is presented through these explanations, at the same time alternating between events in Huka during June/July and the government hearing in December.

Ian arrived in Huka in June and discovers that the gold mine was barely making any profit. Huka is located within a long, narrow valley, with only one road out through a narrow pass (the "Gap"). Moreover, he was confronted by the Peterson brothers (John, Eric and Charlie) who have grown up with the small town and now own a big supermarket and hotel and are quite influential in the town council. Ian noticed that Huka had changed a lot since he last visited this place – the town had grown bigger and the mountain slopes near the town were stripped of the tree cover and now lay bare covered completely with snow. Finding himself alone in this place Ian invites Mike McGill (who is planning to go to Antarctica soon with a government expedition) to visit him in Huka for a little time. As soon as McGill arrives in Huka he is extremely worried by several things and feels that the town is in imminent danger of being destroyed by an avalanche. However both the mine management (who distrust Ian due to his age) and the town council (which is controlled by the Peterson brothers and they too distrust Ian) refuse to believe anything that Ian and McGill tell them about the danger from an avalanche. In spite of this, McGill takes samples of snow from the nearby mountain slopes and concludes that the danger is very real and imminent. As soon as he tries to convey this to the outside (New Zealand authorities in Christchurch) the town is cut off from the outside when the only road into the town is blocked by snow at the Gap and the electricity and telephone wires are cut off by a relatively minor avalanche. After witnessing these events John and Eric Peterson begin to believe what McGill told them and start to mobilise the town resources to prepare for an avalanche. While the whole town is making preparations the avalanche hits them and some 54 people die as a result.

During the government inquiry, some surprising evidence is presented which shows that Charlie Peterson had actually deliberately started the avalanche by skiing very aggressively at the top of the mountain slopes. His motive was to destroy the gold mine and exact revenge on Ian. He is immediately arrested and faces charges for the deaths of several people (including his brother John) in the avalanche. Also, during the hearings in December Ian receives the news that his grandfather (Ben) had died and had effectively left the control of Ballard Holdings in Ian's hand which makes him a very powerful person. Also, he had been romantically linked to Liz Peterson (sister of the Petersons) and marries her at the end, once she learns of Charlie's behaviour.
