= Windfall (novel) =

1982 novel by Desmond Bagley

- First edition
- Author: Desmond Bagley
- Language: English
- Genre: Thriller
- Publisher: Collins
- Publication date: 1982
- Publication place: United Kingdom
- Media type: Print (Hardcover & Paperback)
- Pages: 318 pgs
- ISBN: 0-00-222349-X
- OCLC: 44013632
- Preceded by: Bahama Crisis
- Followed by: Night of Error

Windfall is a novel written by English author Desmond Bagley, and was first published in 1982. It was the last of his works to be published within his lifetime. This novel is one of the few times Desmond Bagley reintroduces a prior protagonist - Max Stafford - in a second novel.

== Plot introduction ==
This is a novel about the source of a mysterious 40 million pound legacy. The main benefactor of Jan Willem Hendryk's legacy was 34 million to a small agricultural college in the remote Rift Valley in Kenya, with the remaining six million to be split between his only known descendants. One descendant is the South African Dirk Hendricks, the new husband of security consultant Max Stafford's friend Alix. The other is the recently discovered Henry Hendrix, a young California beach bum, who is tracked down by down-on-his-luck private detective Ben Hardin. However, a strange series of events involving the attempted murder of Henry Hendrix, and a stranger masquerading as Henry in England lead Hardin to seek help from Stafford. Stafford, for his own reasons, is interested in this mysterious windfall, and the strange clause in the will stating that the heirs must spend one month of every year in Kenya. Suspicious that the man claiming to be Henry Hendrix is an imposter and that the college is not what it seems leads Max Stafford to visit Kenya. The violent reaction to his arrival in Kenya points to a sinister and far-reaching conspiracy far beyond mere greed.
