= The Vivero Letter (novel) =

1968 novel by Desmond Bagley

- First edition
- Author: Desmond Bagley
- Language: English
- Genre: Thriller
- Publisher: Collins
- Publication date: 1968
- Publication place: United Kingdom
- Media type: Print (Hardcover & Paperback)
- Pages: 290 pgs
- Preceded by: Landslide
- Followed by: The Spoilers

The Vivero Letter is a first-person narrative novel written by English author Desmond Bagley, and was first published in 1968. It was also made into a film in 1998 of the same name starring Robert Patrick, Fred Ward and Chiara Caselli.

== Plot introduction ==
Jeremy Wheale's brother is murdered by criminals attempting to steal a family heirloom: a 16th-century gold tray. In attempting to find out what was so special about the tray that someone would kill for it, he discovers that it contains a map. Wheale pursues the trail from Devon, England to Mexico and finally to the tropical rain forests of the Yucatán Peninsula, where he joins with two archaeologists to locate a legendary hoard of gold. This hoard comes from Uaxuanoc, the centuries-old lost city of the Mayas. However, the Mafia are on the trail of Wheale as well as the Chicleros, a deadly group of convict mercenaries, and Wheale is uncertain that he can even trust his two archaeologist friends.
