= The Enemy (Bagley novel) =

1977 novel by Desmond Bagley

- First edition
- Author: Desmond Bagley
- Language: English
- Genre: Thriller novel
- Publisher: Collins
- Publication date: 1977
- Publication place: United Kingdom
- Media type: Print (hardcover and paperback)
- Pages: 322
- ISBN: 1-84232-005-X
- OCLC: 59567001
- Preceded by: The Snow Tiger
- Followed by: Flyaway

The Enemy is a first person narrative espionage thriller novel by English author Desmond Bagley, first published in 1977. In 2001 it was made into a movie starring Roger Moore, Luke Perry and Olivia d'Abo.

== Plot ==
Malcolm Jaggard calls himself an economist, but is really working undercover for British Intelligence. He is engaged to geneticist Dr Penelope Ashton and was spending a weekend at her parents’ home when her sister was viciously attacked by a stranger who threw acid on her face. Jaggard uses his position to investigate the Ashtons and finds to his surprise that the identity of her father, George Ashton, is classified to the highest levels. He is also surprised when his superiors order him to guard the Ashtons against further attacks at all costs, without revealing his own true identity even to Penelope Ashton.

== Characters ==
The main character in this story, is Malcom Jaggard, who works undercover for the British government. He fell in love with Penelope 'Penny' Ashton, an outstanding scientist who works with genetics, and she got ill in Cregar's lab. Cregar is Malcom's enemy. There is also Gillian, Penelope's sister, George Ashton, Penelope's dad, Ogilvie Malcom's boss or Benson, George's servant. There are more characters, but these are the main.
