= The Tightrope Men =

1973 novel by Desmond Bagley

- First edition
- Author: Desmond Bagley
- Language: English
- Genre: Thriller Novel
- Publisher: Collins
- Publication date: 1973
- Publication place: United Kingdom
- Media type: Print (Hardcover & Paperback)
- Pages: 290 pgs
- ISBN: 0-385-04827-0
- OCLC: 656049
- Dewey Decimal: 823/.9/14
- LC Class: PZ4.B147 Ti3 PR6052.A315
- Preceded by: The Freedom Trap
- Followed by: The Snow Tiger

The Tightrope Men is a novel written by English author Desmond Bagley, and was first published in 1973.

== Plot introduction ==
Giles Denison's life is turned upside down when he awakes to find himself in a luxurious hotel. Denison has a reputation as an alcoholic, so waking up in a strange room is not too surprising, but he finds that not only is he now in Oslo, Norway, but that the face in the bathroom mirror is the face of another man.

However he calms down a bit once he locates a scar on his leg, a scar he has had from childhood, and realizes that he had been kidnapped from his flat in London and surgically altered to resemble a Finnish scientist, Dr Harold Feltham Meyrick.

Meyrick is a scientist and engineer with multiple military contracts, who was involved in a British operation to retrieve some scientific documents, with information which would make nuclear missiles virtually obsolete from the Soviet Union.

After an attempt on Denison’s life (as Meyrick), he makes contact with the British authorities seeking help. He is introduced to an old spymaster named Carey, who was involved in the operation with the ‘real’ Meyrick. Compelled to adjust to his new persona (including meeting his daughter) and to play out the role assigned to him by his captors, the group embark on a dangerous escapade from Norway to Finland and across the border into Soviet Russia

Locations

Giles Denison is pursued in a car chase through the Drammen Spiral tunnel in Norway.

A key location in the book is Svetogorsk. This was the site of a major construction project from 1972: a paper mill constructed using Finnish builders.
