= Juggernaut (novel) =

Novel by Desmond Bagley

- First edition
- Author: Desmond Bagley
- Language: English
- Genre: Thriller
- Publisher: Collins
- Publication date: 1985
- Publication place: United Kingdom
- Media type: Print (Hardcover & Paperback)
- Pages: 312 pgs
- ISBN: 0-00-222890-4
- OCLC: 44015494
- Preceded by: Night of Error

Juggernaut is a first-person narrative novel written by English author Desmond Bagley, and was first published in 1985. This was Bagley's last novel, and as he died in 1983, it was completed and published posthumously by his widow.

== Plot introduction ==
American narrator Neil Mannix is a troubleshooter for multinational British Electric, and is sent to former British colony in Africa, Nyala to oversee the installation of a huge 550-ton power transformer. The newly independent Nyala is rich with oil, and hopes to prop up its shaky democracy and economy with a showcase new power station located at a remote location near its oil fields. Due to the increasing precarious political situation, the Nyalan government insists that British Electric dispatch the transformer via huge flatbed truck to reassure the populace, and suspecting difficulties, Mannix is sent to supervise the travels of "the rig". However, a civil war breaks out, and Mannix is bullied by a local doctor and an Irish nun into using the rig as a traveling hospital. He must deal with opposing armies, unsafe roads and bridges, some untrustworthy crew members and the local Nyalans who start to trek after the huge machine, which has taken on symbolic role for the populace.
