= Wyatt's Hurricane =

1966 novel by Desmond Bagley

- First edition
- Author: Desmond Bagley
- Language: English
- Genre: Thriller novel
- Published: 1966 (Collins)
- Publication place: United Kingdom
- Media type: Print (hardcover and paperback)
- Pages: 254 pp
- ISBN: 0-00-615398-4
- OCLC: 26300480
- Preceded by: High Citadel
- Followed by: Landslide

Wyatt's Hurricane is a third person narrative thriller novel by English author Desmond Bagley, first published in 1966.

== Plot introduction ==
David Wyatt is a white West Indian, originally from St Kitts by way of Grenada, and is a meteorologist working with the United States Navy's “Hurricane hunter” flights researching storms and severe weather patterns. He is based out of San Fernandez, a fictional Caribbean island nation with a history and political background strikingly similar to Haiti. Wyatt is convinced that Hurricane Mabel will strike San Fernandez head-on, with a storm surge that will flood its capital of St Pierre, potentially killing thousands. The United States Navy is not convinced, as their computer models indicate that the hurricane will pass by, and the paranoid, megalomaniacal dictator of San Fernandez, General Serrurier, will hear nothing of it. A hurricane has not struck San Fernandez in over fifty years, and he has much more important things to worry about – such as an armed revolt against his rule. As civil war erupts, Wyatt struggles to convince his superiors, the government, and eventually the rebels that the hurricane will be their most serious problem...
