= High Citadel =

1965 novel by Desmond Bagley

- cover of first edition
- Author: Desmond Bagley
- Language: English
- Genre: Thriller Novel
- Publisher: House of Stratus
- Publication date: 1965
- Publication place: United Kingdom
- Media type: Print (Hardcover & Paperback)
- Pages: 296 pgs
- ISBN: 1-84232-012-2
- OCLC: 44013818
- Preceded by: The Golden Keel
- Followed by: Wyatt's Hurricane

High Citadel is a novel written by English author Desmond Bagley, and was first published in 1965.

== Plot introduction ==
In a fictional South American country, a small passenger plane is hijacked by its co-pilot, a Communist agent, and crash-lands at an airstrip high in the Andes mountains. One of the passengers is the liberal ex-president Aguillar, deposed in an earlier coup d'état and now returning. The Communists want him dead to clear the way for their own takeover. But due to a collapsed bridge, the Communists aren't there to meet the plane, and the co-pilot is killed in the landing.

The survivors include the British pilot O'Hara, Aguillar, Aguillar's bodyguard and his beautiful niece, an elderly American school teacher, two American businessmen, a scientist, and a historian. O'Hara leads them down the mountain because of altitude sickness and freezing temperatures. But at the broken bridge, they meet the Communist force, who are trying to repair the bridge.

O'Hara and the passengers hold off the Communists, using improvised weapons suggested by the historian and constructed by the scientist from the scrap of an abandoned mine. Three of the men set off on a dangerous trip over the mountain heights to get help from friends of Aguillar.

The siege of the 'high citadel' becomes increasingly dangerous as Communist reinforcements arrive, while the mountain-crossers encounter extreme hazards and political treachery.
