= Norman Weaver =

Norman Weaver (1913–1989) FSIAD, FZS, was an English artist and photographer who illustrated scientific texts, advertisements and postage stamps and drew book covers for action authors such as Alistair MacLean and Desmond Bagley. During the Second World War he worked as a cartographer for the Allies and was briefly employed as "General Eisenhower's personal map-maker". In 1983 he retired to the Isle of Wight, where he painted large watercolour landscapes of the island and continued to pursue his interest in photography.

== Biography ==
=== Early life ===
A true Cockney, born within the sound of Bow Bells in London, Weaver won a scholarship to the Hammersmith School of Art as a teenager but was unable to complete the course because the grant did not cover his living expenses. He began work in the cabinet-making department of Heal's, a furniture shop on Tottenham Court Road, but moved after two years to become a manuscript writer and calligrapher in another department. During this period, he was attending evening classes in art and was able to win a scholarship to the Central School of Arts and Crafts in London, where he became a teacher after he completed his course shortly before the Second World War.

=== Second World War ===
When the war began he joined the Ordnance Survey and was automatically enlisted in the Royal Engineers. In 1942, he became a cartographer for UNRRA (United Nations Relief and Rehabilitation Administration) and worked on the Rhine Barrage project. He was seconded in 1944 to the American army as a "cartographer for the operations room at HQ in France". In September 1944 he moved to Versailles and worked for the Operational Analysis Team of G.5 SHAFF (Supreme Headquarters Allied Forces in France). It was during this part of his war-service that he was employed as General Eisenhower's map-maker.

=== Post-war ===
When the war ended, Weaver returned to UNRRA as a photo-reporter, covering "repatriation from concentration camps, welfare [and] tracing bureaux" and contributing public-relations stories to publications like Life, Time and Ebony. He was invalided out with nerve damage to his hands. After successful treatment, he began work with the designer Beverley Pick on industrial design, model-making and mural painting, creating exhibitions for companies like Ideal Home. In 1951 he and Pick worked on the "Iron and Steel Pavilion" at the Festival of Britain and created a giant three-dimensional mural "illustrating all the known methods of making steel".

=== Advertising, Wildlife Illustration and Publishing ===
In 1952 Weaver joined the advertising firm Artist Partners Limited as a still life artist. He created art for companies like Wilkinson Sword (the iconic crossed swords), Guinness, Danish Bacon, Heinz, Cadbury's Dairy Milk (a "glass-and-a-half of milk in every bar"), Rowntree's, Polo, and Fox's Mints. He created many memorable covers for books by authors like Alistair MacLean and Desmond Bagley, including the hanged Dutch doll for MacLean's Puppet on a Chain and a surreal juxtaposition of an aircraft and a Venus flytrap for Bagley's The Freedom Trap. He began to specialize in wildlife illustration and particularly fish, "producing all 300 illustrations" for The Fresh and Saltwater Fishes of the World (1976). He also illustrated wildlife stamps issued by the Falkland Islands and Trinidad and Tobago and produced a "British Fish" series for the Royal Mail.
