= Running Blind (Bagley novel) =

1970 novel by Desmond Bagley

- First edition
- Author: Desmond Bagley
- Language: English
- Genre: Thriller novel
- Publisher: Collins
- Publication date: 1970
- Publication place: United Kingdom
- Media type: Print (hardcover and paperback)
- Pages: 254 pp
- ISBN: 0-00-616534-6
- OCLC: 15017582
- Preceded by: The Spoilers
- Followed by: The Freedom Trap

Running Blind is a first person narrative espionage thriller novel by English author Desmond Bagley, first published in 1970 with a cover by Norman Weaver.

== Plot ==
Ex-MI-6 spy Alan Stewart is coerced by his former masters into undertaking a very simple final mission: to deliver a small parcel to a man in Iceland. The mission should be simple for Stewart, as he happens to be fluent in Icelandic and has an Icelandic girlfriend.

However, things go very wrong, very quickly. Soon after his arrival in Iceland he is forced to kill a KGB agent who tries to take the package from him. Then, when Stewart tries to deliver the parcel he realises that he has been doublecrossed and that his former boss is now a double agent. Stewart sets off on a desperate race across some of the world's most rugged, desolate and dramatic scenery, pursued by the KGB, the CIA and his own people, who now think that he has become a traitor. The secret lies in the mysterious parcel and his opponents are more than willing to kill him to prevent him from discovering what that secret is.

== Screen adaptations ==
Geoffrey Reeve was interested in producing a film adaptation and after optioning the rights hired radio dramatist Ian Rodger to write a first draft of a screenplay. However, with Reeves devoting more and more time to the action film Caravan to Vaccarès, the project was shelved.

In 1979 the BBC broadcast a three-part series based on the novel, starring Stuart Wilson, Ragnheiður Steindórsdóttir, George Sewell and Vladek Sheybal, and also featuring Ian McCulloch, Richard Hurndall, Ed Bishop, Joe Praml and Flosi Ólafsson. It was made by BBC Scotland and largely filmed on location in Iceland.
