= The Vivero Letter (film) =

1998 adventure movie

- Directed by: H. Gordon Boos
- Starring: Robert Patrick; Fred Ward; Chiara Caselli
- Release date: 1998

The Vivero Letter is a 1998 adventure film directed by H. Gordon Boos, starring Robert Patrick, Fred Ward, and Chiara Caselli. It is based on Desmond Bagley's 1968 novel The Vivero Letter.

== Plot ==
James Wheeler (Patrick) travels to Central America after his brother's call, but finds his brother murdered and learns of a map to a lost Mayan city. The man teams up with a search expedition and goes off to hunt for these ancient ruins. Unfortunately, almost every member of the group has plans to double-cross the others. All is resolved in bloody fashion in the middle of the jungle wilderness.

== Production ==
The film was shot in Costa Rica.

== Release ==
Originally released under the title The Vivero Letter, the film was also released as Forgotten City in some markets.

== Cast ==
- Robert Patrick - James Wheeler
- Fred Ward - Andrew Fallon
- Chiara Caselli - Caterina Carrara
- John Lewis
- John Verea - Raoul Gato
- Tom Poster - Ray Wheeler
- Juan Patricio Arenas - Salinas
- Daniela Alviani - Milena Brava
- Walter Castro - Thug #1
