= George R. Bagley =

American lawyer

George Robert Bagley
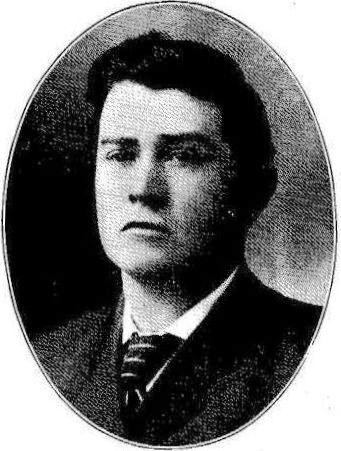

Judge for the 19th Judicial District of Oregon
- In office May 22, 1915 – January 15, 1935

Personal details
- Born: January 25, 1871 Canton, Ohio
- Died: December 26, 1939 (aged 68) Hillsboro, Oregon
- Party: Republican
- Spouse: Olive M. Hanley
- Relations: Harry T. Bagley
- Children: 4
- Profession: Lawyer

George Robert Bagley (January 25, 1871 – December 26, 1939) was an American attorney and jurist in the state of Oregon. A native of Ohio, he was raised in Washington County, Oregon, where he practiced law and served as a circuit court judge for nearly 25 years. Bagley Park in Hillsboro is named in his honor.

== Early life ==
George Robert Bagley was born on January 25, 1871, in Canton, Ohio, to William and Sarah Bagley (née Robinson). The couple had wed in England in 1866 before immigrating to the United States that same year. George was one of six children born to the English natives, which included William H., Harry, Nellie, and Lillie. George lived in Canton until 1885 when the entire family moved west to Oregon, where his father farmed in the community of Leisyville, just north of Hillsboro in Washington County.

George finished his education in the Leisyville school before setting out to become a lawyer. To that end, George read law at the law office of Thomas H. Tongue in Hillsboro from May 1, 1892 until June 1, 1895, at which time he was admitted to the Oregon bar. The following year Tongue was elected to Congress. On April 20, 1897, Bagley married Olive M. Hanley, and they had four children, Clifton, George, Jr., Valerie, and Neville. In 1903, Bagley bought a two-story house from his father at 549 northeast 2nd Street in downtown Hillsboro. Built in 1892, he lived in what is now known as the Phelps-Bagley House until selling it in 1909 to William Curry.

== Career ==
After passing the bar, he began practicing law in Hillsboro. He was a solo practitioner or part of a two-person firm from joining the bar in 1895 until October 1, 1906. From 1896 into 1897 he worked as a deputy district attorney for Washington County, with him giving up the position to his brother Harry. Bagley was also a registered insurance agent in 1898. At that time he partnered with William G. Hare under the firm of Bagley and Hare, and they continued the firm until 1915.

Bagley helped to organize the Oregon Condensed Milk Company in Hillsboro in 1903, and served as the company's attorney and other corporate offices. The company was sold to the Pacific Coast Condensed Milk Company and eventually became the Carnation Milk Plant. Bagley also helped start the railroad to Tillamook, now the Port of Tillamook Bay Railroad, in 1906. In 1915, George represented a detective who had been hired to investigate a murder by Clackamas County. The detective solved the case and then sued the county after the county refused to pay him for his work. In the lawsuit, George's younger brother Harry helped represent Clackamas County. George's client won the lawsuit with a judgment for $2,000 against the county.

=== Political career ===
Bagley was a member of the Republican Party, and served as a campaign committee secretary in 1898. About 1911, Bagley was appointed by his brother Harry, who was mayor of Hillsboro, to a commission to study how to replace the city's old water system. In April 1915, he was appointed as a judge for the Oregon circuit court by Oregon Governor James Withycombe. He was appointed to the 19th judicial circuit that was created at that time and covered Washington and Tillamook counties.

Bagley took office on May 22 and presided over his first session of court on May 24 at the courthouse in Oregon City with a civil suit between Albinia Olds and the Oregon Acetylene Lighting Company. As a judge he oversaw famous trials including the yellow ticket trials and the Bowles trial. Bagley retired from the bench on January 15, 1935, and returned to private practice in Hillsboro and Bagley & Hare.

== Later life and death ==
A Republican in politics, he was also a member of the Knights of Pythias and the Woodmen of the World fraternal organizations. Bagley also helped start the Hillsboro Chamber of Commerce. In 1926, he sold some of his land near downtown Hillsboro to the city for $1 to be used as a park. This land became the city's second park, and was named Bagley Park in his honor. Due to his work promoting a railroad to Tillamook, a station along the Southern Pacific Railroad's Tillamook branch northwest of Hillsboro was named Bagley. George Bagley died on December 26, 1939, in Hillsboro at the age of 68 from a heart ailment and was buried at the cemetery at the Tualatin Plains Presbyterian Church.
