= Thomas Bagley (footballer) =

English footballer

Personal information
- Full name: Thomas Henry Bagley
- Date of birth: 19 October 1909
- Place of birth: Tranmere, England
- Date of death: 1995 (aged 85–86)
- Height: 5 ft 6 3/4 in (1.70 m)
- Position: Outside right

Senior career*
Years	Team	Apps	(Gls)
1928–1929	Hinderton		
1929–1930	New Ferry Bible Class		
1930–1932	Planters (Birkenhead)		
1932	West Bromwich Albion	0	(0)
1932–1933	Bangor City		
1933–1937	Bury	53	(7)
1937–1938	Bradford City	31	(4)
1938–1940	Stockport County	40	(13)
- * Club domestic league appearances and goals

Thomas Henry Bagley (19 October 1909 – 1995) was an English professional footballer who played as an outside right.

== Career ==
Born in Tranmere, Bagley played for Bury, Bradford City and Stockport County. For Bradford City, he made 31 appearances in the Football League; he also made 6 appearances in the FA Cup.

== Sources ==
- Frost, Terry (1988). Bradford City A Complete Record 1903-1988. Breedon Books Sport. ISBN 0-907969-38-0.
