= Thomas Bagley (priest) =

English priest

Thomas Bagley was a 15th-century English priest. In 1431 he was Vicar of "Monenden" (Manuden in Essex) and was described as "a valiant disciple and adherent of Wicliffe". He was condemned for heresy and burnt at Smithfield that year.

He was accused of declaring that if in the sacrament a priest made bread into God, he made a God that can be eaten by rats and mice. He pronounced that the monks, and the nuns, and the friars, and all other privileged persons recognized by the church, were limbs of Satan.
