= Desmond Bagley =

English thriller writer (1923–1983)

- Born: 29 October 1923; Kendal, Westmorland, England
- Died: 12 April 1983 (aged 59); Southampton, England
- Occupations: journalist and novelist
- Spouse: Joan Margaret Brown
- Writing career
- Language: English
- Genre: Thriller
- Website: www.desmondbagley.co.uk

Desmond Bagley (29 October 1923 – 12 April 1983) was an English journalist and novelist known mainly for a series of bestselling thrillers. He and fellow British writers such as Hammond Innes and Alistair MacLean set conventions for the genre: a tough, resourceful, but essentially ordinary hero pitted against villains determined to sow destruction and chaos for their own ends.

== Biography ==
Bagley was born in Kendal, Westmorland – now in Westmorland and Furness – as the son of John and Hannah Bagley. His family moved to the resort town of Blackpool in the summer of 1935, when Bagley was 12. Leaving school not long after the move, Bagley worked as a printer's assistant and factory worker, and during the Second World War in the aircraft industry. Bagley had a stutter all of his life, which initially exempted him from military conscription.

Bagley left England in 1947 for Africa and worked his way overland, crossing the Sahara Desert and briefly settling in Kampala, Uganda, where he contracted malaria. By 1951, he had settled in South Africa, working in the gold mining and asbestos industries in Durban, Natal, before becoming a freelance writer for local newspapers and magazines. While there he met a local bookstore director, Joan Margaret Brown, whom he married in 1960. In an afterword to his novel Windfall, Bagley describes how, as a freelancer for the Johannesburg Sunday Times, he witnessed the 1960 assassination attempt against South African PM Hendrik Verwoerd.

Bagley and his wife Joan left South Africa for England in 1964, where they lived in Bishopsteignton, Devon. They settled in Totnes, Devon, from 1966 to 1976, and then moved to Guernsey. When not travelling to research the exotic backgrounds for his novels, he enjoyed sailing, loved classical music, films and military history, and played war games.

Bagley died on 12 April 1983 at a hospital in Southampton of complications resulting from a stroke. He was 59. Joan Bagley continued to live in Guernsey until her own death in 1999. A plaque was unveiled at their Guernsey home in 2018, jointly honouring their significant contribution to Guernsey society. There is a second plaque, unveiled in October 2023, at Bagley's childhood home in Lord Street, Blackpool, marking the centenary of his birth.

== Writings ==
Bagley's first published short story appeared in the English magazine Argosy in 1957, and his first novel, The Golden Keel, in 1963. Between whiles he was a film critic for The Rand Daily Mail in Johannesburg from 1958 to 1962.

The success of The Golden Keel had led Bagley to turn to full-time novel writing by the mid-1960s. He produced a total of 16 thrillers, all craftsman-like and almost all bestsellers. Typically of British thriller writers of that period, he rarely used recurring characters in different books. Exceptions include Max Stafford (a security consultant featured in Flyaway and Windfall), Slade (a spy who appeared in Running Blind and The Freedom Trap), and Metcalfe (a smuggler/mercenary in The Golden Keel and The Spoilers). His work yielded five mostly unremarkable film adaptations: The Freedom Trap (1971), released in 1973 as The Mackintosh Man by Warner Brothers, directed by John Huston and starring Paul Newman and Dominique Sanda; Landslide, made for television in 1992; The Vivero Letter, filmed in 1998; and The Enemy, starring Roger Moore in 2001. Probably the most successful adaptation was Running Blind, serialised for television by the BBC in 1979.

In several novels Bagley used the first-person narrative. His works have been translated into over 20 languages. One critic wrote, "As long as meticulous craftsmanship and honest entertainment are valued, and as long as action, authenticity, and expertise still make up the strong framework of the good adventure/thriller, Desmond Bagley's books will surely be read."

== Posthumous publications ==
Bagley's last two novels, Night of Error and Juggernaut, were published posthumously after completion by his wife. In 2017, an unpublished first-draft manuscript entitled Because Salton Died was discovered among his papers at the Howard Gotlieb Archival Research Center in Boston, Massachusetts. A complete final draft was subsequently prepared by writer Michael Davies, which was retitled Domino Island and published by HarperCollins on 9 May 2019.

Also discovered among the author's papers was an incomplete and unpublished draft manuscript entitled Writer – An Enquiry into a Novelist. In 2021 this autobiographical account of Bagley's early life and formative influences was edited and published, as a free eBook, by Philip Eastwood.

At the Frankfurt Book Fair in October 2022, HarperCollins announced they had acquired Bagley's catalogue from Brockhurst Publications, which had previously been responsible for managing the author's estate. Alongside the deal, publisher David Brawn revealed that a new original novel – written by Michael Davies as a 'sequel' to Domino Island and using the same protagonist, Bill Kemp – would be published as a centenary tribute to Bagley. The novel, entitled Outback, was published on 11 May 2023. A further sequel, Thin Ice, was published on 24 October 2024.

== Bibliography ==
The dates are for the first UK hardcover publication; all Bagley's novels subsequently appeared in paperback.

- The Golden Keel (1963)
- High Citadel (1965)
- Wyatt's Hurricane (1966)
- Landslide (1967, filmed in 1992 under the same title)
- The Vivero Letter (1968, filmed in 1998 film under the same title)
- The Spoilers (1969)
- Running Blind (1970, serialised for television in 1979)
- The Freedom Trap (1971, filmed in 1973 film as The Mackintosh Man)
- The Tightrope Men (1973)
- The Snow Tiger (1975)
- The Enemy (1977, filmed in 2001 film under the same title)
- Flyaway (1978)
- Bahama Crisis (1980)
- Windfall (1982)

Posthumous Fiction

- Night of Error (1984)
- Juggernaut (1985)
- Domino Island (1972, manuscript completed in 2019 by Michael Davies)

Non-Fiction

- Writer – An Enquiry into a Novelist (2021, manuscript edited and published by Philip Eastwood)
