= Masud Rana =

Fictional character

- Author: Qazi Anwar Hussain
- Cover artist: Hashem Khan; Shahadat Chowdhury; Asaduzzaman; Ismail Arman; Victor Nill; Alim Aziz; Hasan Khurshid Rumi; Ranobir Ahmed Biplob; Sharafat Khan
- Language: Bengali
- Series: Masud Rana
- Subject: Thriller
- Genre: Espionage/mystery/adventure
- Publisher: Sheba Prokashoni
- Publication date: 1966 – Current
- Publication place: Bangladesh
- Media type: Print (paperback)
- Website: https://sebaprokashoni.com/

Masud Rana is a fictional character created in 1966 by the writer Qazi Anwar Hussain, who featured him in 472 books (325 novels and 6 short stories). Qazi Anwar Hussain created the adult spy-thriller series Masud Rana, at first modeled after James Bond, but expanded widely. So far 472 books have been published in this series which has gained a lot of popularity in Bangladesh. Written from the 1960s and continuing to present day, books are published almost every three months by Sheba Prokashoni, one of the most popular publishing houses of Bangladesh. Although Qazi Anwar Hussain started the series, he no longer writes it. A group of ghostwriters are employed to produce all the new Masud Rana novels.,

The Masud Rana books describe the adventures of its eponymous hero Masud Rana, an international espionage agent of Bangladeshi origin, closely resembling James Bond in his expertise with weapons and love for women. Although the sole author of the series was Qazi Anwar Hussain, it is known that he liberally extracted segments of plots from popular Western spy thrillers from the contemporary period. Nonetheless, the series became a boon for young people in post-war Bangladesh, who had few entertainment alternatives in an era pre-dating cable TV, the Internet and smart phones. The books caused concern among some middle-class parents because of their occasional racy contents, and reading Masud Rana was an activity often frowned upon. The series eventually ran to well over four hundred individual titles.

Masud Rana has also been adapted for one Bengali film and one TV drama.

In July 2018, the Bangladeshi production house Jaaz Multimedia received permission from Hussain to make three movies based on the first three novels of the series. The production house hopes to release the films in the next five years.

== Creation and inspiration ==
The character was created in 1966 by Bangladeshi novelist Qazi Anwar Hussain in an attempt to write an adult spy thriller for Bangladeshi readers. According to the preface of "Dhongsho-Pahar" (first book in the series), Hussain was inspired and encouraged by his close friend Mahbub Amin.

Hussain took the name for his character from the first name of Hussain's friend, lyricist Masud Karim, and Rana Pratap Singh of the Rajput clan who ruled Mewar, a state in north-western India from 1540 to 1597. Hussain admitted in a 1994 interview that he was heavily influenced by the Ian Fleming character James Bond.

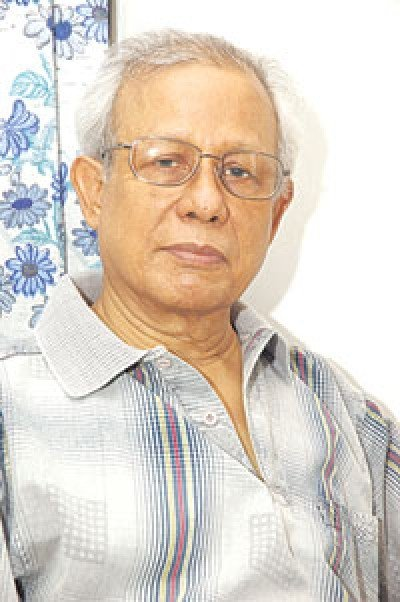
Qazi Anwar Hussain, creator and author of Masud Rana series

== Masud Rana in other media ==
A full-length feature film about Rana was made in 1974 titled Masud Rana. Masud Parvez, who is known by his stage name Sohel Rana directed and starred in it. The film is based on the story Bishmaron [Amnesia] (which in turn is based on Strictly for Cash.. by James Hadley Chase.) It is the 11th story in the series and was first published in 1967.

Three films based on first three novels from the series are planned. In July 2018, the Jaaz Multimedia production house announced that it was going to make the films based on Dhwangsha Pahar, Bharatnatyam and Swarna Mrigya. "We recently received permission to make films on the widely read Masud Rana series from Qazi Anwar Hussain," the company said. These three movies will be made and released over the course of next five years. The first film, which will be based on Dhongsho-Pahar, will go on shooting floors in January 2019.

The first package drama in the history of Bangladesh, Prachir Periye (Beyond the Wall) was telecast in 1994 and is based on Pishach Dweep (The Island of Evil) with screenplay by Atiqul Haque Chowdhury and stars Bipasha Hayat.

In 2023, Jaaz Multimedia released a Bengali movie, MR-9: Do or Die, directed by Asif Akbar based on the novel Dhangsa Pahar. Another adaptation titled Masud Rana will be releasing on Eid-ul-Azha of 2026 starring Russell Rana and Puja Cherry Roy.

== Profile and background ==
Masud Rana
- Created by: Qazi Anwar Hussain
- Full name: Masud Rana
- Aliases: Masud Kaysar, Morris Renner, Imrul Hasan, Al-Shahriar
- Gender: Male
- Occupation: Intelligence Officer, Military Officer, Espionage Operative, Adventurer, Archeologist, Engineer
- Family: Justice Imtiaz Chowdhury (Father); Jahanara Imtiaz Chowdhury (Mother)
- Relatives: Ismat Ara (Aunt); Erfan Chowdhury (Uncle)
- Nationality: Bangladeshi
- Birth Date & Place: 9 April 1936; Dhaka, Bangladesh
- Height: 5 feet 11.5 inch
- Hair / Eyes: Black / Deep Black
- Army rank: Major
- Favourite Weapon: Walther PPK, Stiletto Knife
- Best Friend: Brigadier Sohel Ahmed
- Other Associates: Shohana Chowdhury, Bobby Moorland, Vincent Gogol, Guilty Mia, Salil Sen, Zahed Iqbal, Rupa, Rayhan Rashid, Larry King, Vitella Remarick
- Expertise: High Reflex, Analytics, Judo-Karate, Emergency/Crisis Management, Explosive Search & Control, Firearms Retention Tactics, Unarmed Tactical Combat, Sniping, Combat Shooting, Sharpshooting, Under Water Combat, Tactical Motor Driving, Knife Combat, Hostage-Negotiation, Archaeology and many others to name.
- Frequent Villains: Kabir Chawdhury, U Sen, Rudolph Gunther, Jack Lemmon, Chawdhury Khayrul Kabir (son of Kabir Chawdhury), Gustaf Tatavosky

Masud Rana is a former major of the Bangladesh Army who is currently serving as a commander stationed for HUMINT (Human Intelligence) at the Bangladesh Counter Intelligence (BCI) headquarters in Dhaka. He works under the direct command of Major General (retired) Rahat Khan, the head of BCI.

In the Masud Rana series, Rana is not only a member of the BCI but also the founder and director of an international investigating firm called Rana Agency. The agency serves as a front cover for BCI in the form of a private investigation agency.

Additionally, Rana holds the position of chairman at Saul Shipping Corporation, a multinational shipping company. He took on this position after the death of Rebecca Saul

=== Early life ===
Masud Rana was born in Dhaka, Bangladesh, to Justice Imtiaz Chowdhury and Jahanara Imtiaz Chowdhury. Unfortunately, at the age of 13, his parents were killed in a car accident near Chittagong, leaving him orphaned.

After his parents' death, Rana went to live with his aunt, Ismat Ara, in Fort William, Highland. Later, he briefly attended Eton College, a prestigious boarding school in England.

According to the early Pakistan-era novels of the Masud Rana series, Rana joined the Pakistan Army and graduated from the Royal Military Academy Sandhurst. He began his army career in the infantry (regiment unknown) and eventually became a commando, later joining Military Intelligence. At a young age, Rana was promoted to the rank of major. He was later recruited by Rahat Khan to work for PCI, which later became BCI.

During the liberation war of Bangladesh, Major Rana fought in the front-line with guerrillas while hiding his real identity and rank. After independence, Rana and Sohel worked together to rebuild BCI from the ashes. Sohel worked in the light while Rana remained in the shadows.

=== Psychological evaluation ===
Masud Rana is a unique individual with a strong spirit and principles. He is known for his fearlessness and willingness to take on heavy risks. Rana tends to be a solitary individual who enjoys athletic pursuits such as running, skiing, hiking, swimming, diving, and most notably, climbing.

Rana is a goal-oriented individual who seeks structure in his life. He has acquired strong tastes and thrives under a sense of pattern and habit. Despite this, Rana finds subtle ways of rebelling against structure.

He has a remarkable willingness to take on dangerous missions, making him an excellent candidate for intelligence, espionage, counterintelligence, and covert operations assignments.

Rana has strong interpersonal skills and can act comfortably in many situations. However, he tends to seek companionship mainly for sexual recreation.

Rana's lone wolf personality tends to attract others, but he does not console himself by surrounding himself with others. He prefers to carefully organize the aspects of his personality that he reveals to others, and he excels at burying information he does not wish to reveal.

While the world is far from black and white to Rana, he does tend to see it in stark terms of chaos and order, tradition and change. Rana has chosen to identify with order and tradition.

=== Hobbies ===
He is a highly skilled athlete who excels in solitary sports such as climbing, diving, swimming, and running. Additionally, he has a passion for driving high-end vehicles at high speeds, although he does not participate in racing. Rana has been known to enjoy gambling at various casinos, but has never allowed it to result in financial ruin. He also indulges in drinking, but in moderation and not to excess.

=== Intelligence training ===
Major Rana underwent specialized training and orientation for BCI Covert Operations. He demonstrated outstanding physical endurance as well as aptitude in logical and psychological operations exercises.

=== Special forces training ===
Major Rana completed specialized orientations and BCI Covert Operations training, showcasing exceptional physical endurance, as well as logical and psychological operations exercises.

Graduating with mastery in Underwater and Aquatic Warfare training, Major Rana's expertise extends to jungle, desert, Arctic, mountain, and urban warfare. In addition, he earned certifications for operating various rotary and fixed-wing aircraft, including fighter jets, hovercraft, marine assault vessels, and armored vehicles. His training encompasses special reconnaissance, sniping, evasive driving, free-falling, hostage rescue and negotiation, human-intelligence gathering, and numerous other military skills.

Major Rana proved his capabilities as a trainer, adept at training other candidates, initiating athletic competitions, and fostering a creative environment. He excels in guerrilla warfare, counter-terrorism, hostage rescue, asymmetric warfare, and covert reconnaissance.

Major Rana has a natural aptitude for learning BCI methods and excels in languages, speaking fluently without accent in Arabic, Hebrew, Russian, English, Italian, French, and German. He also speaks, reads, and writes passable Greek, Spanish, Mandarin, Cantonese, and Japanese. In some situations, Rana has been known to come across as arrogant and overly confident.

Rana tends to work best with general goals and the freedom to accomplish those goals in the manner he sees fit. Although he often appears as a loner, he exemplifies discipline and results-oriented action. Rana enjoys taking risks, calculating the odds of success, and playing those risks to the edge of failure. However, he may appear visibly bored and restless during more mundane aspects of training.

=== BCI HQ, Dhaka ===
Rana continued to work as a mission specialist in locations such as the United States, Russia, the United Kingdom, France, Zimbabwe, Italy, Australia, Chili, Myanmar, Thailand, Hong Kong, Norway, Israel, Sweden, Brazil, Egypt, India, Pakistan and many other countries of the world.

=== Intelligence service ===
Rana's service with the BCI has been marked by moments of exemplary but risky bravado. While performing his duties with great zeal, Major Rana has often taken it upon himself to expand upon his orders, and, on more than one occasion, to violate them outright.

=== Foreign agencies ===
Rana has been a special projects director of the fictional US agency National Underwater & Maritime Agency. He is also an advisor to the British Secret Intelligence Service.

=== Mercenary / foreign military ===
Rana has fought around the world as a freedom fighter in Palestine, Lebanon, Syria, Congo, Bosnia, Katanga and Zimbabwe.

He has served on deputation/temporary attachment with the Egyptian Army, as a staff officer in Military Intelligence and a trainer in the Special Forces. He has served with various US Special Operations units such as Force Recon, Special Forces in many joint operations. He has served undercover in the Royal Navy on an assignment from MI6 to foil an anarchist plot, and in the mercenary Katanga Army to rescue a Rana Agency agent stranded inside rebel territory. He is also a team leader of an anti-terrorism unit of the United Nations.

== Masud Rana books at a glance ==
Some Rana books are little more than direct translations from well known Western titles with only character names being changed i.e. "Shotru Bibhishon" from The Negotiator and "Ondho Shikari" from The Fourth Protocol. But most of the books have changes that resonate with Bangladeshi readers, hence their popularity.

Each Rana paperback opens with these lines:

"An untameable daredevil spy of Bangladesh Counter Intelligence. On secret missions he travels the globe. His life is queer. His movements are mysterious and strange. His heart, a beautiful mix of gentle and tough. Single. He attracts, but refuses to get snared. Wherever he encounters injustice, oppression, and wrong, he fights back. Every step he takes is shadowed by danger, fear, and the risk of death.
Come, let us acquaint ourselves with this daring, always hip, young man. In a flash, he will lift us out of the monotony of a mundane life to an awesome world of our dreams. You are invited. Thank you."

The series is made up of 475 books (328 novels and 10 short stories), with 125 stories in two volumes and 11 stories in three volumes, a book containing one short story, and a book containing a collection of 5 stories, making a total of 475 books published as follows:

Book no. in series	Story no.	Title English translation	Source / note	Publication year
001	001	Dhongsho-Pahar (ধ্বংস-পাহাড়); The Hill of Destruction	Rana-1. Spy Thriller. Original Story	1966
002	002	Bharotnatyam (ভারতনাট্যম); Indian Dance	Original Story. Spy Thriller	1966
003	003	Shwarnomriga (স্বর্ণমৃগ); The Golden Deer	Based very loosely on the amalgamation of Goldfinger and On Her Majesty's Secret Service by Ian Fleming. James Bond novels	1967
004	004	Dusshahoshik (দুঃসাহসিক); Bravado	Based very loosely on Diamonds Are Forever by Ian Fleming. A James Bond novel	1967
005	005	Mrityur Sathe Panja (মৃত্যুর সাথে পাঞ্জা); Palm with the Death	Based loosely on The Last Frontier by Alistair MacLean. Spy adventure	1967
006	006	Durgom Durgo (দুর্গম দুর্গ); The Unreachable Fortress	Based loosely on The Guns of Navarone by Alistair MacLean. Spy adventure	1967
007	007	Shotru Bhoyonkor (শত্রু ভয়ংকর); Deadly Enemy	Based very loosely on Fear Is the Key by Alistair MacLean. Spy adventure	1967
008	008	Sagor Songom 01 (সাগর সঙ্গম ০১); Sea Confluence	Based very loosely on an amalgamation of Moonraker and The Spy Who Loved Me by Ian Fleming. James Bond novels	1967
009	008	Sagor Songom 02 (সাগর সঙ্গম ০২)	Based very loosely on an amalgamation of Moonraker and The Spy Who Loved Me by Ian Fleming. James Bond novels	1967
010	009	Rana Shabdhan! (রানা সাবধান !!); Rana Beware!	Based on Assignment – Cong Hai Kill by Edward S. Aarons. A Sam Durell novel	1968
011	010	Bishmaron (বিস্মরণ); Amnesia	Based on Strictly for Cash by James Hadley Chase. Thriller	1968
012	011	Ratnodweep (রত্নদ্বীপ); Treasure Island	Based on When Eight Bells Toll by Alistair MacLean. Thriller	1968
013	012	Neel Atonko 01 (নীল আতংক ০১); Blue Terror	Based on The Satan Bug by Alistair MacLean. Thriller	1969
014	012	Neel Atonko 02 (নীল আতংক ০২)	Based on The Satan Bug by Alistair MacLean. Thriller	1969
015	013	Cairo (কায়রো)	Based on Assignment – Ceylon by Edward S. Aarons. A Sam Durell novel	1969
016	014	Mrityuprohor (মৃত্যুপ্রহর); Hour of Death	Based on Where Eagles Dare by Alistair MacLean. Spy adventure	1969
017	015	Gupto Chokro (গুপ্তচক্র); The Secret Gang	Based on The Dark Crusader by Alistair MacLean. Thriller	1970
018	016	Mullo Ek Koti Taka Matro (মূল্য এক কোটি টাকা মাত্র); Price Taka One Crore Only	Based on Web of Spies by Nick Carter.	1970
019	017	Ratri Ondhokar (রাত্রি অন্ধকার); Dark Night	Based on Force 10 From Navarone by Alistair MacLean. Spy adventure	1970
020	018	Jaal (জাল); Net	Donald Hamilton's 'The Ravangers'	1970
021	019	Atol Singhashon (অটল সিংহাসন); The Unshakable Throne	Based on SAS Versus the CIA by Gérard de Villiers. Espionage thriller	1971
022	020	Mrityur Thikana (মৃত্যুর ঠিকানা); Death's Address	Based on West of Jerusalem by Gérard de Villiers. Espionage thriller	1971
023	021	Khapa Nortok (ক্ষ্যাপা নর্তক); The Mad Dancer	Based on Assignment – The Cairo Dancers by Edward S. Aarons. A Sam Durell novel	1971
024	022	Shoitaner Dut (শয়তানের দূত); Satan's Emissary	Based on The Copenhagen Affair by John Oram. AKA The Man from U.N.C.L.E. novel	1971
025	023	Ekhono Shorojontro (এখনও ষড়যন্ত্র); Still Conspiracy	Original Story. Political spy thriller	1972
026	024	Proman Koi? (প্রমাণ কই?); Where's the Proof?	Original Story. Mystery thriller	1972
027	025	Bipodjonok 01 (বিপদজনক ০১); Dangerous	Same as Mrityur Sathe Panja with only change of opponents. Spy adventure	1972
028	025	Bipodjonok 02 (বিপদজনক ০২)	Same as Mrityur Sathe Panja with only change of opponents. Spy adventure	1972
029	026	Rokter Rong 01 (রক্তের রঙ ০১); The Colour of Blood		1973
030	026	Rokter Rong 02 (রক্তের রঙ ০২)		1973
031	027	Odrissho Shotru (অদৃশ্য শত্রু); The Invisible Enemy	Original Story	1973
032	028	Pishach Dweep (পিশাচ দ্বীপ); The Island of the Vampires	An original story. Horror thriller	1973
033	029	Bideshi Guptochor 01 (বিদেশী গুপ্তচর ০১); The Foreign Spy	Based on Mission to Venice by James Hadley Chase. Don Micklem #1	1974
034	029	Bideshi Guptochor 02 (বিদেশী গুপ্তচর ০২)	Based on Mission to Venice by James Hadley Chase. Don Micklem #1	1974
035	030	Black Spider 01 (ব্ল্যাক স্পাইডার ০১)	Based on Mission to Siena by James Hadley Chase. Thriller. Don Micklem #2	1974
036	030	Black Spider 02 (ব্ল্যাক স্পাইডার ০২)	Based on Mission to Siena by James Hadley Chase. Thriller. Don Micklem #2	1974
037	031	Gupto Hatya (গুপ্তহত্যা); Assassination	Based on The Exterminator by W.A Ballinger (Wilfred McNeilly). Thriller	1974
038	032	Teen Shatru (তিন শত্রু); The Three Enemies		1974
039	033	Okosshat Shimanto 01 (অকস্মাৎ সীমান্ত ০১); Suddenly the Border	Based on Have This One on Me by James Hadley Chase. Thriller. Mark Girland #3	1975
040	033	Okosshat Shimanto 02 (অকস্মাৎ সীমান্ত ০২)	Based on Have This One on Me by James Hadley Chase. Thriller. Mark Girland #3	1975
041	034	Shotorko Shoitan (সতর্ক শয়তান); Cautious Devil	Based on The Way to Dusty Death by Alistair MacLean. Mystery thriller	1975
042	035	Neel Chobi 01 (নীল ছবি ০১); Blue Film	Based on The Whiff of Money by James Hadley Chase. Espionage thriller. Mark Girland #4	1975
043	035	Neel Chobi 02 (নীল ছবি ০২)	Based on The Whiff of Money by James Hadley Chase. Espionage thriller. Mark Girland #4	1975
044	036	Probesh Nished 01 (প্রবেশ নিষেধ ০১); No Entry	Based on Puppet on a Chain by Alistair MacLean. Thriller	1975
045	036	Probesh Nished 02 (প্রবেশ নিষেধ ০২)	Based on Puppet on a Chain by Alistair MacLean. Thriller	1976
046	037	Pagol Boigganik (পাগল বৈজ্ঞানিক); The Mad Scientist	Based on The Danger Key by Nick Carter. A Nick Carter novel	1976
047	038	Espionage 01 (এসপিওনাজ ০১)	Based on You Have Yourself a Deal by James Hadley Chase. Spy thriller. Mark Girland #2	1976
048	038	Espionage 02 (এসপিওনাজ ০২)	Based on You Have Yourself a Deal by James Hadley Chase. Spy thriller. Mark Girland #2	1976
049	039	Laal Paharr (লাল পাহাড়); Red Mountain	Based on Mackenna's Gold by Will Henry. Western treasure-hunting adventure	1977
050	040	Hritkompon (হৃৎকম্পন); The Pounding Heart		1977
051	041	Protihingsha 01 (প্রতিহিংসা ০১); Grudge	Based on Just Another Sucker by James Hadley Chase. Thriller	1977
052	041	Protihingsha 02 (প্রতিহিংসা ০২)	Based on Just Another Sucker by James Hadley Chase. Thriller	1977
053	042	Hong Kong Shomrat 01 (হংকং সম্রাট ০১); The King of Hong Kong	Based on The Freedom Trap aka The Mackintosh Man by Desmond Bagley. Thriller	1977
054	042	Hong Kong Shomrat 02 (হংকং সম্রাট ০২)	Based on The Freedom Trap aka The Mackintosh Man by Desmond Bagley. Thriller	1977
055	043	Kuuu! (কুউউ!)	Based on Breakheart Pass by Alistair MacLean. Western Adventure	1977
056	044	Biday, Rana 01 (বিদায়, রানা ০১); Farewell, Rana	Antarctica adventure Based on A Grue of Ice aka The Disappearing Island by Geoffrey Jenkins. Sea Adventure Thriller	1978
057	044	Biday, Rana 02 (বিদায়, রানা ০২)	Antarctica adventure Based on A Grue of Ice aka The Disappearing Island by Geoffrey Jenkins. Sea Adventure Thriller	1978
058	044	Biday, Rana 03 (বিদায়, রানা ০৩)	Antarctica adventure Based on A Grue of Ice aka The Disappearing Island by Geoffrey Jenkins. Sea Adventure Thriller	1978
059	045	Protidondi 01 (প্রতিদ্বন্দ্বী ০১); Adversary		1978
060	045	Protidondi 02 (প্রতিদ্বন্দ্বী ০২)		1978
061	046	Akromon 01 (আক্রমণ ০১); The Attack	Based on Attack Alarm by Hammond Innes.	1978
062	046	Akromon 02 (আক্রমণ ০২)	Based on Attack Alarm by Hammond Innes.	1978
063	047	Grash 01 (গ্রাস ০১); The Eat-Up	Based on Landslide by Desmond Bagley. Thriller	1978
064	047	Grash 02 (গ্রাস ০২)	Based on Landslide by Desmond Bagley. Thriller	1978
065	048	Shwarnotori 01 (স্বর্ণতরী ০১); Ship of Gold	Based on The Golden Keel by Desmond Bagley. Suspense adventure, treasure-hunting adventure	1978
066	048	Shwarnotori 02 (স্বর্ণতরী ০২)	Based on The Golden Keel by Desmond Bagley. Suspense adventure, treasure-hunting adventure	1979
067	049	Poppy (পপি)	Based on The Spoilers by Desmond Bagley. Thriller	1979
068	050	Gypsy 01 (জিপসী ০১)	Based on Caravan to Vaccarès by Alistair MacLean. Thriller	1979
069	050	Gypsy 02 (জিপসী ০২)	Based on Caravan to Vaccarès by Alistair MacLean. Thriller	1979
070	051	Ameei Rana 01 (আমিই রানা ০১); I Am Rana	Based on The Tightrope Men by Desmond Bagley. Espionage thriller	1979
071	051	Ameei Rana 02 (আমিই রানা ০২)	Based on The Tightrope Men by Desmond Bagley. Espionage thriller	1979
072	052	Shei U Sen 01 (সেই উ সেন ০১); That U Sen	Based on The Day of the Jackal by Frederick Forsyth. Suspense thriller	1979
073	052	Shei U Sen 02 (সেই উ সেন ০২)	Based on The Day of the Jackal by Frederick Forsyth. Suspense thriller	1980
074	053	Hello, Shohana 01 (হ্যালো সোহানা ০১)	Based on The Deep by Peter Benchley. Thriller	1980
075	053	Hello, Shohana 02 (হ্যালো সোহানা ০২)	Based on The Deep by Peter Benchley. Thriller	1980
076	054	Hijack 01 (হাইজ্যাক ০১)	Based on High Citadel by Desmond Bagley. Adventure thriller	1980
077	054	Hijack 02 (হাইজ্যাক ০২)	Based on High Citadel by Desmond Bagley. Adventure thriller	1980
078	055	I Love You, Man 01 (আই লাভ ইউ, ম্যান ০১)	Based on The Eye of the Tiger by Wilbur Smith. Adventure thriller	1980
079	055	I Love You, Man 02 (আই লাভ ইউ, ম্যান ০২)	Based on The Eye of the Tiger by Wilbur Smith. Adventure thriller	1980
080	055	I Love You, Man 03 (আই লাভ ইউ, ম্যান ০৩)	Based on The Eye of the Tiger by Wilbur Smith. Adventure thriller	1980
081	056	Sagor Konna 01 (সাগরকন্যা ০১); Sea Maiden	Based on Seawitch by Alistair MacLean. Thriller	1980
082	056	Sagor Konna 02 (সাগরকন্যা ০২)	Based on Seawitch by Alistair MacLean. Thriller	1980
083	057	Palabe Kothay 01 (পালাবে কোথায় ০১); No Where to Run	Based on Running Blind by Desmond Bagley. Spy thriller	1980
084	057	Palabe Kothay 02 (পালাবে কোথায় ০২)	Based on Running Blind by Desmond Bagley. Spy thriller	1980
085	058	Target Nine 01 (টার্গেট নাইন ০১)	Based on The Dark of the Sun by Wilbur Smith. African adventure thriller	1981
086	058	Target Nine 02 (টার্গেট নাইন ০২)	Based on The Dark of the Sun by Wilbur Smith. African adventure thriller	1981
087	059	Bish Nishshas 01 (বিষ নিশ্বাস ০১); Poisonous Breath	Based on Why Pick on Me? by James Hadley Chase. Thriller. Tom Lepski #14	1981
088	059	Bish Nishshas 02 (বিষ নিশ্বাস ০২)	Based on Why Pick on Me? by James Hadley Chase. Thriller. Tom Lepski #14	1981
089	060	Pretatma 01 (প্রেতাত্মা ০১); Ghost	Based on Vixen 03 by Clive Cussler. Dirk Pitt #5	1981
090	060	Pretatma 02 (প্রেতাত্মা ০২)	Based on Vixen 03 by Clive Cussler. Dirk Pitt #5	1981
091	061	Bondi Gogol (বন্দী গগল); Gogol in Confinement	Based on Figure It Out for Yourself / The Marijuana Mob by James Hadley Chase. Thriller. Vic Malloy #2	1981
092	062	Zimmy (জিম্মি); Hostage	Based on Hostage Tower by John Denis. Thriller	1981
093	063	Tushar Jatra 01 (তুষারযাত্রা ০১); Snow Journey	Based on Avalanche Express by Colin Forbes. Spy thriller.	1981
094	063	Tushar Jatra 02 (তুষারযাত্রা ০২)	Based on Avalanche Express by Colin Forbes. Spy thriller.	1981
095	064	Swarno Songkot 01 (স্বর্ণসংকট ০১); The Golden Trouble	Based on The Savage Day by Jack Higgins. Thriller	1981
096	064	Swarno Songkot 02 (স্বর্ণসংকট ০২)	Based on The Savage Day by Jack Higgins. Thriller	1981
097	065	Sonnyashini (সন্ন্যাসিনী); The Priestess	Based on The Khufra Run by Jack Higgins, writing as James Graham. Thriller	1981
098	066	Pasher Kamra (পাশের কামরা); The Room Next Door	Based on A Coffin from Hong Kong by James Hadley Chase. Mystery thriller	1982
099	067	Nirapod Karagar 01 (নিরাপদ কারাগার ০১); The Safe Jail	Based on Bloody Passage by Jack Higgins. Thriller	1982
100	067	Nirapod Karagar 02 (নিরাপদ কারাগার ০২)	Based on Bloody Passage by Jack Higgins. Thriller	1982
101	068	Swargo Rajjya 01 (স্বর্গরাজ্য ০১); Utopia	Iceberg by Clive Cussler. Dirk Pitt #2	1982
102	068	Swargo Rajjya 02 (স্বর্গরাজ্য ০২)	Iceberg by Clive Cussler. Dirk Pitt #2	1982
103	069	Uddhar 01 (উদ্ধার ০১); Rescue	Based on A Cage of Ice by Duncan Kyle. Arctic adventure	1982
104	069	Uddhar 02 (উদ্ধার ০২)	Based on A Cage of Ice by Duncan Kyle. Arctic adventure	1982
105	070	Humlaa 01 (হামলা ০১); Raid	The Mediterranean Caper by Clive Cussler. Dirk Pitt #1	1982
106	070	Humlaa 02 (হামলা ০২)	The Mediterranean Caper by Clive Cussler. Dirk Pitt #1	1982
107	071	Protishodh 01 (প্রতিশোধ ০১); Revenge	Based on Mallory by James Hadley Chase. Mystery thriller	1982
108	071	Protishodh 02 (প্রতিশোধ ০২)	Based on Mallory by James Hadley Chase. Mystery thriller	1982
109	072	Major Rahat 01 (মেজর রাহাত ০১)	Based on The Heights of Zervos by Colin Forbes. War thriller	1982
110	072	Major Rahat 02 (মেজর রাহাত ০২)	Based on The Heights of Zervos by Colin Forbes. War thriller	1983
111	073	Leningrad 01 (লেনিনগ্রাদ ০১)	Based on Ice Station Zebra by Alistair MacLean. Mystery thriller	1983
112	073	Leningrad 02 (লেনিনগ্রাদ ০২)	Based on Ice Station Zebra by Alistair MacLean. Mystery thriller	1983
113	074	Ambush 01 (অ্যামবুশ ০১)	Based on Night Without End by Alistair MacLean. Antarctic adventure thriller	1983
114	074	Ambush 02 (অ্যামবুশ ০২)	Based on Night Without End by Alistair MacLean. Antarctic adventure thriller	1983
115	075	Arek Bermuda 01 (আরেক বারমুডা ০১); Another Bermuda	Based on Pacific Vortex! by Clive Cussler. Dirk Pitt #6	1983
116	075	Arek Bermuda 02 (আরেক বারমুডা ০২)	Based on Pacific Vortex! by Clive Cussler. Dirk Pitt #6	1983
117	076	Benami Bondor 01 (বেনামী বন্দর ০১); The Unnamed Port	Based on Triple by Ken Follett. Spy thriller	1983
118	076	Benami Bondor 02 (বেনামী বন্দর ০২)	Based on Triple by Ken Follett. Spy thriller	1984
119	077	Nokol Rana 01 (নকল রানা ০১); Duplicate Rana	Based on Air Force One is Down by Alistair MacLean and John Denis. Thriller	1984
120	077	Nokol Rana 02 (নকল রানা ০২)	Based on Air Force One is Down by Alistair MacLean and John Denis. Thriller	1984
121	078	Reporter 01 (রিপোর্টার ০১)	Based on Terror's Cradle by Duncan Kyle. Spy thriller	1984
122	078	Reporter 02 (রিপোর্টার ০২)	Based on Terror's Cradle by Duncan Kyle. Spy thriller	1984
123	079	Moru Jatra 01 (মরু যাত্রা ০১); Desert Journey	Based on This Is For Real by James Hadley Chase. Spy thriller. Mark Girland #1	1984
124	079	Moru Jatra 02 (মরু যাত্রা ০২)	Based on This Is For Real by James Hadley Chase. Spy thriller. Mark Girland #1	1984
125	080	Bondhu (বন্ধু); Friend	Based on The Ninth Directive by Adam Hall. Thriller	1984
126	081	Shongket 01 (সংকেত ০১); Signal	Based on The Key to Rebecca by Ken Follett. Spy thriller	1984
127	081	Shongket 02 (সংকেত ০২)	Based on The Key to Rebecca by Ken Follett. Spy thriller	1984
128	081	Shongket 03 (সংকেত ০৩)	Based on The Key to Rebecca by Ken Follett. Spy thriller	1985
129	082	Spordha 01 (স্পর্ধা ০১); Dare	Based on The Golden Gate by Alistair MacLean. Thriller	1985
130	082	Spordha 02 (স্পর্ধা ০২)	Based on The Golden Gate by Alistair MacLean. Thriller	1985
131	083	Challenge (চ্যালেঞ্জ)	Based on The Dark Street by Peter Cheyney	1985
132	084	Shotrupokkho (শত্রুপক্ষ); The Enemy Side		1985
133	085	Charidike Shatru 01 (চারিদিকে শত্রু ০১); Enemy All Around	Based on Firefox by Craig Thomas. A Mitchell Gant novel. One of the very few Rana adaptation whose final outcome is totally different from the source novel.	1985
134	085	Charidike Shatru 02 (চারিদিকে শত্রু ০২)	Based on Firefox by Craig Thomas. A Mitchell Gant novel. One of the very few Rana adaptation whose final outcome is totally different from the source novel.	1986
135	086	Agnipurush 01 (অগ্নিপুরুষ ০১); Man on Fire	Based on Man on Fire by A. J. Quinnell. Marcus Creasy #1.	1986
136	086	Agnipurush 02 (অগ্নিপুরুষ ০২)	Based on Man on Fire by A. J. Quinnell. Marcus Creasy #1.	1986
137	087	Andhokare Cheeta 01 (অন্ধকারে চিতা ০১); The Leopard in Darkness	Based on The Leopard Hunts in Darkness by Wilbur Smith. African adventure thriller	1986
138	087	Andhokare Cheeta 02 (অন্ধকারে চিতা ০২)	Based on The Leopard Hunts in Darkness by Wilbur Smith. African adventure thriller	1986
139	088	Moron Kamor 01 (মরণকামড় ০১); Death Sting	Based on Live and Let Die by Ian Fleming. A James Bond novel	1986
140	088	Moron Kamor 02 (মরণকামড় ০২)	Based on Live and Let Die by Ian Fleming. A James Bond novel	1987
141	089	Moron Khela 01 (মরণখেলা ০১); Deadly Game	Based on Target Five by Colin Forbes. Arctic adventure	1987
142	089	Moron Khela 02 (মরণখেলা ০২)	Based on Target Five by Colin Forbes. Arctic adventure	1987
143	090	Apoharon 01 (অপহরণ ০১); The Abduction	Based on Sunflower by Marilyn Sharp. Espionage thriller	1987
144	090	Apoharon 02 (অপহরণ ০২)	Based on Sunflower by Marilyn Sharp. Espionage thriller	1987
145	091	Abar Shei Dusshwapno 01 (আবার সেই দুঃস্বপ্ন ০১); Again that Nightmare	Based on Dark Side of The Street by Jack Higgins. Crime thriller	1987
146	091	Abar Shei Dusshwapno 02 (আবার সেই দুঃস্বপ্ন ০২)	Based on Dark Side of The Street by Jack Higgins. Crime thriller	1987
147	092	Biparjoy 01 (বিপর্যয় ০১); Devastation	Based on Double Jeopardy by Colin Forbes. Mystery thriller	1987
148	092	Biparjoy 02 (বিপর্যয় ০২)	Based on Double Jeopardy by Colin Forbes. Mystery thriller	1987
149	093	Shantidoot 01 (শান্তিদূত ০১); Messenger of Peace	Based on Telefon by Walter Wager. Spy thriller	1987
150	093	Shantidoot 02 (শান্তিদূত ০২)	Based on Telefon by Walter Wager. Spy thriller	1988
151	094	Shwet Shontrash 01 (শ্বেত সন্ত্রাস ০১); White Terrorism	Based on Wild Justice by Wilbur Smith. Action thriller	1988
152	094	Shwet Shontrash 02 (শ্বেত সন্ত্রাস ০২)	Based on Wild Justice by Wilbur Smith. Action thriller	1988
153	095	Chodmobeshi (ছদ্মবেশী); The Disguised One		1988
154	096	Culprit 01 (কালপ্রিট ০১)		1988
155	096	Culprit 02 (কালপ্রিট ০২)		1988
156	097	Mrityu Alingon 01 (মৃত্যু আলিঙ্গন ০১); Embrace of Death	Based on The Suvarov Adventure by Duncan Kyle. Spy thriller	1988
157	097	Mrityu Alingon 02 (মৃত্যু আলিঙ্গন ০২)	Based on The Suvarov Adventure by Duncan Kyle. Spy thriller	1989
158	098	Shomoyshima Moddhorat (সময়্সীমা মধ্যরাত); Deadline Midnight	Based on Midnight Plus One by Gavin Lyall. Suspense adventure	1989
159	099	Abar U Sen 01 (আবার উ সেন ০১); Again U Sen	Based on For Special Services by John Gardner. A James Bond novel	1989
160	099	Abar U Sen 02 (আবার উ সেন ০২)	Based on For Special Services by John Gardner. A James Bond novel	1989
161	100	Boomerang (বুমেরাং)		1989
162	101	Ke Keno Kibhabe (কে কেন কিভাবে); Who Why How		1989
163	102	Mukto Bihongo 01 (মুক্ত বিহঙ্গ ০১); The Free Bird	Based on Cry Wolf by Wilbur Smith. African war adventure	1989
164	102	Mukto Bihongo 02 (মুক্ত বিহঙ্গ ০২)	Based on Cry Wolf by Wilbur Smith. African war adventure	1989
165	103	Kuchakra (কুচক্র); The Evil Circle		1989
166	104	Chai Shamrajya 01 (চাই সাম্রাজ্য ০১); I Want the Empire	Treasure by Clive Cussler. Dirk Pitt #9	1990
167	104	Chai Shamrajya 02 (চাই সাম্রাজ্য ০২)	Treasure by Clive Cussler. Dirk Pitt #9	1990
168	105	Onuprobesh 01 (অনুপ্রবেশ ০১); Infiltration	Based on Nobody Lives for Ever by John Gardner. A James Bond novel	1990
169	105	Onuprobesh 02 (অনুপ্রবেশ ০২)	Based on Nobody Lives for Ever by John Gardner. A James Bond novel	1990
170	106	Jatra Oshubho 01 (যাত্রা অশুভ ০১); The Ominous Journey	Based on The White South aka The Survivors by Hammond Innes. Antarctic adventure	1990
171	106	Jatra Oshubho 02 (যাত্রা অশুভ ০২)	Based on The White South aka The Survivors by Hammond Innes. Antarctic adventure	1990
172	107	Juari 01 (জুয়াড়ী ০১); The Gambler	Based on Just the Way It Is by James Hadley Chase. Thriller.	1990
173	107	Juari 02 (জুয়াড়ী ০২)	Based on Just the Way It Is by James Hadley Chase. Thriller.	1990
174	108	Kalo Taka 01 (কালো টাকা ০১); Black Money	Based on The Swiss Conspiracy by Michael Stanley. Thriller	1990
175	108	Kalo Taka 02 (কালো টাকা ০২)	Based on The Swiss Conspiracy by Michael Stanley. Thriller	1990
176	109	Cocaine Shomrat 01 (কোকেন সম্রাট ০১); The Cocaine Emperor	Based on White Gamma by David Chacko. Thriller	1990
177	109	Cocaine Shomrat 02 (কোকেন সম্রাট ০২)	Based on White Gamma by David Chacko. Thriller	1991
178	110	Bishkonnya 01 (বিষকন্যা ০১); Poisonous Girl		1991
179	110	Bishkonnya 02 (বিষকন্যা ০২)		1991
180	111	Sattya Baba 01 (সত্য বাবা ০১); Father Truth	Based on Scorpius by John Gardner. A James Bond novel	1991
181	111	Sattya Baba 02 (সত্য বাবা ০২)	Based on Scorpius by John Gardner. A James Bond novel	1991
182	112	Jaatrira Hooshiyar (যাত্রীরা হুঁশিয়ার); Passengers Beware		1991
183	113	Operation Cheetah (অপারেশন চিতা)		1991
184	114	Akroman '89 01 (আক্রমণ '৮৯ ০১); Attack '89	Based on Win, Lose or Die by John Gardner. A James Bond novel	1991
185	114	Akroman '89 02 (আক্রমণ '৮৯ ০২)	Based on Win, Lose or Die by John Gardner. A James Bond novel	1991
186	115	Assanta Sagor 01 (অশান্ত সাগর ০১); The Restless Sea	Based on Night of Error by Desmond Bagley. Suspense thriller	1992
187	115	Assanta Sagor 02 (অশান্ত সাগর ০২)	Based on Night of Error by Desmond Bagley. Suspense thriller	1992
188	116	Shapod Shonkul 01 (শ্বাপদ সংকুল ০১); Full of Beasts	Based on A Time to Die by Wilbur Smith. African adventure	1992
189	116	Shapod Shonkul 02 (শ্বাপদ সংকুল ০২)	Based on A Time to Die by Wilbur Smith. African adventure	1992
190	116	Shapod Shonkul 03 (শ্বাপদ সংকুল ০৩)	Based on A Time to Die by Wilbur Smith. African adventure	1992
191	117	Dongshon 01 (দংশন ০১); Sting	Based on When the Lion Feeds by Wilbur Smith. African adventure	1992
192	117	Dongshon 02 (দংশন ০২)	Based on When the Lion Feeds by Wilbur Smith. African adventure	1992
193	118	Proloy Sangket 01 (প্রলয় সংকেত ০১); The Signal of Doom	Based on The Doomsday Conspiracy by Sidney Sheldon. Sci-fi thriller	1992
194	118	Proloy Sangket 02 (প্রলয় সংকেত ০২)	Based on The Doomsday Conspiracy by Sidney Sheldon. Sci-fi thriller	1992
195	119	Black Magic 01 (ব্ল্যাক ম্যাজিক ০১)	Based on The Spear by James Herbert. Nazi occultism and the holy lance adventure thriller	1992
196	119	Black Magic 02 (ব্ল্যাক ম্যাজিক ০২)	Based on The Spear by James Herbert. Nazi occultism and the holy lance adventure thriller	1992
197	120	Tikto Obokash 01 (তিক্ত অবকাশ ০১); A Bitter Holiday	Based on You Find Him, I'll Fix Him by James Hadley Chase. Mystery thriller	1992
198	120	Tikto Obokash 02 (তিক্ত অবকাশ ০২)	Based on You Find Him, I'll Fix Him by James Hadley Chase. Mystery thriller	1992
199	121	Double Agent 01 (ডাবল এজেন্ট ০১)	Based No Deals, Mr. Bond by John Gardner. A James Bond novel	1993
200	121	Double Agent 02 (ডাবল এজেন্ট ০২)	Based No Deals, Mr. Bond by John Gardner. A James Bond novel	1993
201	122	Ami Shohana 01 (আমি সোহানা ০১); I Am Shohana	Based on A Taste for Death by Peter O'Donnell. A Modesty Blaise novel	1993
202	122	Ami Shohana 02 (আমি সোহানা ০২)	Based on A Taste for Death by Peter O'Donnell. A Modesty Blaise novel	1993
203	123	Ogni Shawpoth 01 (অগ্নিশপথ ০১); The Oath of Fire		1993
204	123	Ogni Shawpoth 02 (অগ্নিশপথ ০২)		1993
205	124	Japani Fanatic 01 (জাপানী ফ্যানাটিক ০১); Japanese Fanatic	Based on Dragon by Clive Cussler. Dirk Pitt #10	1993
206	124	Japani Fanatic 02 (জাপানী ফ্যানাটিক ০২)	Based on Dragon by Clive Cussler. Dirk Pitt #10	1993
207	124	Japani Fanatic 03 (জাপানী ফ্যানাটিক ০৩)	Based on Dragon by Clive Cussler. Dirk Pitt #10	1993
208	125	Shakkhat Shoitan 01 (সাক্ষাৎ শয়তান ০১); Real Devil	Based on I, Lucifer by Peter O'Donnell. A Modesty Blaise novel	1993
209	125	Shakkhat Shoitan 02 (সাক্ষাৎ শয়তান ০২)	Based on I, Lucifer by Peter O'Donnell. A Modesty Blaise novel	1993
210	126	Guptoghatok 01 (গুপ্তঘাতক ০১); The Assassin	Based on Time of the Assassins by Alastair MacNeill. Thriller	1993
211	126	Guptoghatok 02 (গুপ্তঘাতক ০২)	Based on Time of the Assassins by Alastair MacNeill. Thriller	1994
212	127	Naropishach 01 (নরপিশাচ ০১); The Fiend	Based on Elephant Song by Wilbur Smith. African adventure thriller	1994
213	127	Naropishach 02 (নরপিশাচ ০২)	Based on Elephant Song by Wilbur Smith. African adventure thriller	1994
214	127	Naropishach 03 (নরপিশাচ ০৩)	Based on Elephant Song by Wilbur Smith. African adventure thriller	1994
215	128	Shatru Bibhishon 01 (শত্রু বিভীষণ ০১); The Enemy Within	Based on The Negotiator by Frederick Forsyth. Political thriller	1994
216	128	Shatru Bibhishon 02 (শত্রু বিভীষণ ০২)	Based on The Negotiator by Frederick Forsyth. Political thriller	1994
217	129	Andho Shikari 01 (অন্ধ শিকারী ০১); The Blind Hunter	Based on The Fourth Protocol by Frederick Forsyth. Espionage thriller	1994
218	129	Andho Shikari 02 (অন্ধ শিকারী ০২)	Based on The Fourth Protocol by Frederick Forsyth. Espionage thriller	1994
219	130	Dui Nombor 01 (দুই নম্বর ০১); Number Two	Based on Icebreaker by John Gardner. A James Bond novel	1994
220	130	Dui Nombor 02 (দুই নম্বর ০২)	Based on Icebreaker by John Gardner. A James Bond novel	1994
221	131	Krisnopokkho 01 (কৃষ্ণপক্ষ ০১); The Dark Moon	Based on Brokenclaw by John Gardner. A James Bond novel	1994
222	131	Krisnopokkho 02 (কৃষ্ণপক্ষ ০২)	Based on Brokenclaw by John Gardner. A James Bond novel	1994
223	132	Kaalo Chayya 01 (কালো ছায়া ০১); The Black Shadow	Based on Bloodspoor by James McVean. Adventure thriller	1995
224	132	Kaalo Chayya 02 (কালো ছায়া ০২)	Based on Bloodspoor by James McVean. Adventure thriller	1995
225	133	Nokol Biggyani 01 (নকল বিজ্ঞানী ০১); The Fake Scientist	Based on Believed Violent by James Hadley Chase. Spy thriller. Frank Terrell #4	1995
226	133	Nokol Biggyani 02 (নকল বিজ্ঞানী ০২)	Based on Believed Violent by James Hadley Chase. Spy thriller. Frank Terrell #4	1995
227	134	Boro Khudha 01 (বড় ক্ষুধা ০১); Huge Hunger	Based on The Beast by Peter Benchley. Creature-hunting thriller	1995
228	134	Boro Khudha 02 (বড় ক্ষুধা ০২)	Based on The Beast by Peter Benchley. Creature-hunting thriller	1995
229	135	Shwarnodeep 01 (স্বর্ণদ্বীপ ০১); The Island of Gold	Based on Bear Island by Alistair MacLean. Suspense adventure	1995
230	135	Shwarnodeep 02 (স্বর্ণদ্বীপ ০২)	Based on Bear Island by Alistair MacLean. Suspense adventure	1995
231	136	Rokto Pipasa 01 (রক্তপিপাসা ০১); Bloodthirst	Based on Inca Gold by Clive Cussler. Dirk Pitt #12	1995
232	136	Rokto Pipasa 02 (রক্তপিপাসা ০২)	Based on Inca Gold by Clive Cussler. Dirk Pitt #12	1995
233	136	Rokto Pipasa 03 (রক্তপিপাসা ০৩)	Based on Inca Gold by Clive Cussler. Dirk Pitt #12	1995
234	137	Opocchaya 01 (অপচ্ছায়া ০১); Phantom	Based on Death is Forever by John Gardner. A James Bond novel	1995
235	137	Opocchaya 02 (অপচ্ছায়া ০২)	Based on Death is Forever by John Gardner. A James Bond novel	1995
236	138	Bartho Mission 01 (ব্যর্থ মিশন ০১); The Failed Mission		1995
237	138	Bartho Mission 02 (ব্যর্থ মিশন ০২)		1996
238	139	Neel Dongshon 01 (নীল দংশন ০১); The Blue Bite		1996
239	139	Neel Dongshon 02 (নীল দংশন ০২)		1996
240	140	Saudia-103 01 (সাউদিয়া ১০৩ ০১)	Based on The Perfect Kill by A. J. Quinnell. Marcus Creasy #2	1996
241	140	Saudia-103 02 (সাউদিয়া ১০৩ ০২)	Based on The Perfect Kill by A. J. Quinnell. Marcus Creasy #2	1996
242	141	Kalpurush 01 (কালপুরুষ ০১); The Protagonist	Based on The Sandler Inquiry by Noel Hynd. Mystery thriller	1996
243	141	Kalpurush 02 (কালপুরুষ ০২)	Based on The Sandler Inquiry by Noel Hynd. Mystery thriller	1996
244	141	Kalpurush 03 (কালপুরুষ ০৩)	Based on The Sandler Inquiry by Noel Hynd. Mystery thriller	1996
245	142	Neel Bajro 01 (নীল বজ্র ০১); Blue Thunder	Based on GoldenEye by John Gardner. A James Bond novel	1996
246	142	Neel Bajro 02 (নীল বজ্র ০২)	Based on GoldenEye by John Gardner. A James Bond novel	1996
247	143	Mrityur Protinidhi 01 (মৃত্যুর প্রতিনিধি ০১); Emissary of Death	Based on Caper by Lawrence Sanders. Crime action thriller.	1996
248	143	Mrityur Protinidhi 02 (মৃত্যুর প্রতিনিধি ০২)	Based on Caper by Lawrence Sanders. Crime action thriller.	1997
249	144	Kaalkut 01 (কালকূট ০১); Toxin	Based on Sahara by Clive Cussler. Dirk Pitt #11	1997
250	144	Kaalkut 02 (কালকূট ০২)	Based on Sahara by Clive Cussler. Dirk Pitt #11	1997
251	144	Kaalkut 03 (কালকূট ০৩)	Based on Sahara by Clive Cussler. Dirk Pitt #11	1997
252	145	Omanisha 01 (অমানিশা ০১); Darkness		1997
253	145	Omanisha 02 (অমানিশা ০২)		1997
254	146	Shobai Chole Geche 01 (সবাই চলে গেছে ০১); Everyone Has Left	Based on The Wild Geese by Daniel Carney. War adventure	1997
255	146	Shobai Chole Geche 02 (সবাই চলে গেছে ০২)	Based on The Wild Geese by Daniel Carney. War adventure	1997
256	147	Anonto Jatra 01 (অনন্ত যাত্রা ০১); Endless Journey	Based on Campbell's Kingdom by Hammond Innes.	1997
257	147	Anonto Jatra 02 (অনন্ত যাত্রা ০২)	Based on Campbell's Kingdom by Hammond Innes.	1997
258	148	Roktochosha (রক্তচোষা); Blood Sucker	Based on The Eyes of Darkness by Dean Koontz	1997
259	149	Kalo File 01 (কালো ফাইল ০১); The Black File	Based on Icon by Frederick Forsyth. Political thriller	1997
260	149	Kalo File 02 (কালো ফাইল ০২)	Based on Icon by Frederick Forsyth. Political thriller	1997
261	149	Kalo File 03 (কালো ফাইল ০৩)	Based on Icon by Frederick Forsyth. Political thriller	1998
262	150	Mafia (মাফিয়া)		1998
263	151	Hirok Shomrat 01 (হীরকসম্রাট ০১); The Diamond King	Based on Shock Wave by Clive Cussler. Dirk Pitt #13	1998
264	151	Hirok Shomrat 02 (হীরকসম্রাট ০২)	Based on Shock Wave by Clive Cussler. Dirk Pitt #13	1998
265	152	Saat Rajar Dhon (সাত রাজার ধন); The Most Precious	Based on Maddon's Rock by Hammond Innes. Sea adventure	1998
266	153	Shesh Chaal 01 (শেষ চাল ০১); The Last Gamble	Based on The Seventh Scroll by Wilbur Smith. Treasure hunting adventure	1998
267	153	Shesh Chaal 02 (শেষ চাল ০২)	Based on The Seventh Scroll by Wilbur Smith. Treasure hunting adventure	1998
268	153	Shesh Chaal 03 (শেষ চাল ০৩)	Based on The Seventh Scroll by Wilbur Smith. Treasure hunting adventure	1998
269	154	Big Bang (বিগ ব্যাং)	Based on The Day Before Midnight by Stephen Hunter. Suspense thriller	1998
270	155	Operation Bosnia (অপারেশন বসনিয়া)	Based on Into Hell's Fire by Douglas Cavanaugh	1998
271	156	Target Bangladesh (টার্গেট বাংলাদেশ)	Based on Tomorrow Never Dies by Raymond Benson. A James Bond novel	1998
272	157	Mohaproloy (মহাপ্রলয়); The Cataclysm		1998
273	158	Juddhobaaz (যুদ্ধবাজ); The Warmonger		1998
274	159	Princess Hiya 01 (প্রিন্সেস হিয়া ০১)	Based on Flood Tide by Clive Cussler. Dirk Pitt #14	1998
275	159	Princess Hiya 02 (প্রিন্সেস হিয়া ০২)	Based on Flood Tide by Clive Cussler. Dirk Pitt #14	1999
276	160	Mrityu Faand (মৃত্যুফাঁদ); Death Trap	Based on There's a Hippie on the Highway by James Hadley Chase. Thriller. Frank Terrell #5	1999
277	161	Shoitaner Ghati (শয়তানের ঘাঁটি); The Abode of the Devil		1999
278	162	Dhongsher Noksha (ধ্বংসের নকশা); The Design of Destruction	Based on Licence Renewed by John Gardner. A James Bond novel	1999
279	163	Mayan Treasure (মায়ান ট্রেজার)	Based on The Vivero Letter by Desmond Bagley. Adventure	1999
280	164	Jhorer Purbabhash (ঝড়ের পূর্বাভাস); Storm Warning	Based on Wyatt's Hurricane by Desmond Bagley. Disaster thriller	1999
281	165	Akranto Dutabash (আক্রান্ত দূতাবাস); Embassy Under Attack	Based on Siege of Silence by A. J. Quinnell. Action thriller	1999
282	166	Jonmobhumi (জন্মভূমি); Motherland		1999
283	167	Durgom Giri (দূর্গম গিরি); The Unreachable Mountain		1999
284	168	Moron Jatra (মরণযাত্রা); The Journey to Death	Based on The Cassandra Crossing by Robert Katz. Suspense thriller	1999
285	169	Madokchokro (মাদকচক্র); The Illegal Alcohol Dealers' Ring		1999
286	170	Shakuner Chhaya 01 (শকুনের ছায়া ০১); Vulture's Shadow	Based on On Wings of Eagles by Ken Follett. Spy thriller	1999
287	170	Shakuner Chhaya 02 (শকুনের ছায়া ০২)	Based on On Wings of Eagles by Ken Follett. Spy thriller	2000
288	171	Turuper Taash (তুরুপের তাস); The Trump Card		2000
289	172	Kalshap (কালসাপ); The Deadly Snake	Based on The Cobra Kill by Nick Carter A Nick Carter novel	2000
290	173	Goodbye, Rana (গুডবাই, রানা)	Based on Licence to Kill by John Gardner. A James Bond novel	2000
291	174	Shima Longhon (সীমা লঙ্ঘন); Beyond the Limit		2000
292	175	Rudrojhor (রুদ্রঝড়); Raging Storm	Based on The Trojan Horse by Hammond Innes.	2000
293	176	Kantar Moru (কান্তার মরু); The Impassable Desert	Based on The Z Document by Nick Carter A Nick Carter novel	2000
294	177	Korkoter Bish (কর্কটের বিষ); Poison of the Scorpion	Based on Black Horn by A. J. Quinnell. Marcus Creasy #4	2000
295	178	Boston Jolche (বোস্টন জ্বলছে); Boston is Burning	Based on Boston Blitz by Don Pendleton.	2000
296	179	Shoitaner Doshor (শয়তানের দোসর); Satan's Friend		2000
297	180	Noroker Thikana (নরকের ঠিকানা); The Address of Hell		2000
298	181	Ognibaan (অগ্নিবাণ); The Firearms		2000
299	182	Kuheli Raat (কুহেলি রাত); Foggy Night	Based on Cambodia by Nick Carter. A Nick Carter novel	2001
300	183	Bishakto Thaba (বিষাক্ত থাবা); The Poisonus Claw		2001
301	184	Jonmoshotru (জন্মশত্রু); The Nemesis		2001
302	185	Mrityur Haatchani (মৃত্যুর হাতছানি); The Beckoning of Death		2001
303	186	Shei Pagol Boigganik (সেই পাগল বৈজ্ঞানিক); That Mad Scientist		2001
304	187	Serbia Chokranto (সার্বিয়া চক্রান্ত); The Serbian Conspiracy		2001
305	188	Durobhisondhi (দুরভিসন্ধি); Sinister Motive	Based on Inca Death Squad by Nick Carter A Nick Carter novel	2001
306	189	Killer Cobra (কিলার কোবরা)	Based on Codename: Werewolf by Nick Carter A Nick Carter novel	2001
307	190	Mrityu Pother Jatri (মৃত্যুপথের যাত্রী); Passenger of Death	Based on COLD aka Cold Fall by John Gardner. A James Bond novel	2001
308	191	Palao, Rana! (পালাও, রানা!); Hide, Rana!		2001
309	192	Deshprem (দেশপ্রেম); Patriotism		2001
310	193	Roktolalosha (রক্তলালসা); Blood Lust		2001
311	194	Bagher Khacha (বাঘের খাঁচা); The Tiger's Cage		2002
312	195	Secret Agent (সিক্রেট এজেন্ট)		2002
313	196	Virus X-99 (ভাইরাস এক্স-৯৯)		2002
314	197	Muktipon (মুক্তিপণ); Ransom		2002
315	198	Chin e Shongkot (চীনে সংকট); Trouble in China		2002
316	199	Gopon Shotru (গোপন শত্রু); The Hidden Enemy		2002
317	200	Mossad Chokranto (মোসাদ চক্রান্ত); The Mossad Conspiracy		2002
318	201	Choroshdeep (চরসদ্বীপ); Canabis Island		2002
319	202	Bipodsheema (বিপদসীমা); The Borderline of Danger		2002
320	203	Mrityubeej (মৃত্যুবীজ); Death Seed		2002
321	204	Jaat Gokhkhur (জাতগোক্ষুর); Cobra by Nature		2002
322	205	Abar Shorojontro (আবার ষড়যন্ত্র); Conspiracy Again	Original Story, theme from the movie Eraser	2002
323	206	Ondho Akrosh (অন্ধ আক্রোশ); Blind Rage		2003
324	207	Oshubho Prohor (অশুভ প্রহর); The Ominous Hours	Based on The Spy Who Loved Me film by Christopher Wood. A James Bond novel	2003
325	208	Konoktori (কনকতরী); The Boat of Gold		2003
326	209	Shwarnokoni 01 (স্বর্ণখনি ০১); Gold Mine	Based on Valhalla Rising by Clive Cussler. Dirk Pitt #16	2003
327	209	Shwarnokoni 02 (স্বর্ণখনি ০২)	Based on Valhalla Rising by Clive Cussler. Dirk Pitt #16	2003
328	210	Operation Israel (অপারেশন ইসরায়েল)		2003
329	211	Shoitaner Upashok (শয়তানের উপাসক); The Worshiper of Satan	Based on the movie Indiana Jones and the Temple of Doom	2003
330	212	Harano Mig (হারানো মিগ); The Lost MiG		2003
331	213	Blind Mission (ব্লাইন্ড মিশন)	Based on Clear The Fast Lane by Douglas Rutherford	2003
332	214	Top Secret 01 (টপ সিক্রেট ০১)	Based on Colonel Sun: a James Bond Adventure by Kingsley Amis. A James Bond Novel	2003
333	214	Top Secret 02 (টপ সিক্রেট ০২)	Based on Colonel Sun: a James Bond Adventure by Kingsley Amis. A James Bond Novel	2003
334	215	Mohabipod Shongket (মহাবিপদ সংকেত); Danger Signal	Based on the film Moonraker by Christopher Wood. A James Bond novel	2003
335	216	Sobuj Shongket (সবুজ সংকেত); The Green Signal		2004
336	217	Operation Kanchanjongha (অপারেশন কাঞ্চনজঙ্ঘা); Operation Kanchanjongha	Based on High Time to Kill by Raymond Benson. A James Bond novel	2004
337	218	Gohin Aronyo (গহীন অরণ্য); Deep Forrest	Based on Congo by Michael Crichton. African adventure	2004
338	219	Project X-15 (প্রজেক্ট X-15)		2004
339	220	Ondhokarer Bondhu (অন্ধকারের বন্ধু); The Friend of Darkness	Based on The Solar Menace by Nick Carter A Nick Carter novel	2004
340	221	Abar Shohana (আবার সোহানা); Shohana Again		2004
341	222	Arek Godfather (আরেক গডফাদার); Another Godfather		2004
342	223	Andhoprem (অন্ধপ্রেম); Blind Love	Based on The World Is Not Enough by Raymond Benson. A James Bond novel	2004
343	224	Mission Tel Aviv (মিশন তেলআবিব)		2004
344	225	Crime Boss (ক্রাইম বস)		2004
345	226	Shumerur Daak 01 (সুমেরুর ডাক ০১); Call of the North Pole	Based on Whiteout by Duncan Kyle. Arctic thriller	2004
346	226	Shumerur Daak 02 (সুমেরুর ডাক ০২)	Based on Whiteout by Duncan Kyle. Arctic thriller	2004
347	227	Ishkaponer Tekka (ইশকাপনের টেক্কা); The Ace of Spade		2005
348	228	Kalo Noksha (কালো নকশা); The Black Design	Based on The List by Nick Carter. A Nick Carter novel	2005
349	229	Kalnagini (কালনাগিনী); She-Snake	Based on A Can of Worms by James Hadley Chase. Tom Lepski #11. Thriller	2005
350	230	Beimaan (বেঈমান); Traitor		2005
351	231	Durgay Ontoreen (দূর্গে অন্তরীণ); Confined in the Castle		2005
352	232	Morukonna (মরুকন্যা); Desert Girl	Based on the Indiana Jones movie Raiders of the Lost Ark. Novelization by Campbell Black.	2005
353	233	Red Dragon (রেড ড্রাগন)	Based on Like a Hole in the Head by James Hadley Chase. Thriller. Tom Lepski #6	2005
354	234	Bishchokro (বিষচক্র); Poison Ring	Based on Istanbul by Nick Carter A Nick Carter novel	2005
355	235	Shoitaner Dweep (শয়তানের দ্বীপ); Island of Evil	Based on Dr. No by Ian Fleming. A James Bond novel	2005
356	236	Mafia Don (মাফিয়া ডন)		2005
357	237	Harano Atlantis 01 (হারানো আটলান্টিস ০১); The Lost Atlantis	Based on Atlantis Found by Clive Cussler. Dirk Pitt #15	2005
358	237	Harano Atlantis 02 (হারানো আটলান্টিস ০২)	Based on Atlantis Found by Clive Cussler. Dirk Pitt #15	2005
359	238	Mrityubaan (মৃত্যুবাণ); Spear of Death	Based on Thunderball by Ian Fleming. A James Bond novel	2006
360	239	Commando Mission (কমান্ডো মিশন)		2006
361	240	Shesh Hashi 01 (শেষ হাসি ০১); Last Laugh	Based on Temple by Matthew Reilly. Adventure thriller	2006
362	240	Shesh Hashi 02 (শেষ হাসি ০২)	Based on Temple by Matthew Reilly. Adventure thriller	2006
363	241	Smuggler (স্মাগলার); Smuggler	Based on Goldfinger by Ian Fleming. A James Bond novel	2006
364	242	Bondi Rana (বন্দী রানা); Rana Confined		2006
365	243	Nater Guru (নাটের গুরু); The Mastermind		2006
366	244	Asche Cyclone (আসছে সাইক্লোন); Cyclone's Coming		2006
367	245	Shawhojoddha (সহযোদ্ধা); The Comrade in Arms	Based on the movie Rambo III. Novelization by David Morrell. Action thriller	2006
368	246	Gupto Shongket 01 (গুপ্ত সংকেত ০১); Secret Code	Based on The Da Vinci Code by Dan Brown. A Robert Langdon novel	2006
369	246	Gupto Shongket 02 (গুপ্ত সংকেত ০২)	Based on The Da Vinci Code by Dan Brown. A Robert Langdon novel	2006
370	247	Criminal (ক্রিমিনাল)	Same as Bondi Gogol. Based on Figure It Out for Yourself / The Marijuana Mob by James Hadley Chase. Vic Malloy #2. Thriller	2006
371	248	Beduyin Konna (বেদুইন কন্যা); Bedouin Girl		2007
372	249	Arokhkhito Jalshima (অরক্ষিত জলসীমা); Unguarded Waterline	Based on Saigon by Nick Carter. Spy thriller	2007
373	250	Duronto Eagle 01 (দুরন্ত ঈগল ০১); Daredevil Eagle	Based on Assignment – White Rajah by Edward S. Aarons. A Sam Durell novel.	2007
374	250	Duronto Eagle 02 (দুরন্ত ঈগল ০২)	Based on Assignment – White Rajah by Edward S. Aarons. A Sam Durell novel.	2007
375	251	Shorpolata (সর্পলতা); Snake Vine		2007
376	252	Amanush (অমানুষ); Inhuman	Based on White Shark by Peter Benchley. Creature-hunting thriller	2007
377	253	Okhondo Aboshor (অখন্ড অবসর); Undisturbed Retirement	Based on The Dennecker Code by J. C. Pollock. Thriller	2007
378	254	Sniper 01 (স্নাইপার ০১)	Based on Point of Impact by Stephen Hunter. A Bob Lee Swagger novel.	2007
379	254	Sniper 02 (স্নাইপার ০২)	Based on Point of Impact by Stephen Hunter. A Bob Lee Swagger novel.	2007
380	255	Casino Andaman (ক্যাসিনো আন্দামান)	Based on Mission to Venice by Nick Carter-Killmaster. A Nick Carter novel	2007
381	256	Jalrakkhosh (জলরাক্ষস); Water Monster	Based on Killer by Peter Tonkin. Creature-hunting adventure	2007
382	257	Mrityusheetal Sparsho 01 (মৃত্যুশীতল স্পর্শ ০১); Death-cold Touch	Based on Pandora's Curse by Jack Du Brul. A Philip Mercer novel	2008
383	257	Mrityusheetal Sparsho 02 (মৃত্যুশীতল স্পর্শ ০২)	Based on Pandora's Curse by Jack Du Brul. A Philip Mercer novel	2008
384	258	Swopner Bhalobasha (স্বপ্নের ভালোবাসা); Dream Love	Based on The Flesh of the Orchid by James Hadley Chase. Thriller. Blandish's Orchids and Dave Fenner #2	2008
385	259	Hacker 01 (হ্যাকার ০১)	Original book. Techno-thriller	2008
386	259	Hacker 02 (হ্যাকার ০২)	Original book. Techno-thriller	2008
387	260	Khune Mafia (খুনে মাফিয়া); Murderous Mafia	Based on I'll Bury My Dead by James Hadley Chase. Thriller	2008
388	261	Nikhoj (নিঁখোজ); Missing	Based on The Bend in the River by David George Deutsch. Amazon adventure	2008
389	262	Bush Pilot (বুশ পাইলট); Bush Pilot	Based on East of Desolation by Jack Higgins	2008
390	263	Achena Bondor 01 (অচেনা বন্দর ০১); Unknown Port	Based on The Dogs of War by Frederick Forsyth.	2009
391	263	Achena Bondor 02 (অচেনা বন্দর ০২)	Based on The Dogs of War by Frederick Forsyth.	2009
392	264	Blackmailer (ব্ল্যাকমেইলার)	Based on The Silver Mistress by Peter O'Donnell. A Modesty Blaise novel	2009
393	265	Antordhan 01 (অন্তর্ধান ০১); The Vanishing	Based on The Protector by David Morrell. Mystery thriller	2009
394	265	Antordhan 02 (অন্তর্ধান ০২)	Based on The Protector by David Morrell. Mystery thriller	2009
395	266	Drug lord (ড্রাগলর্ড); Drug Lord	Based on Devil May Care by Sebastian Faulks. A James Bond novel	2009
396	267	Dwipantor (দ্বীপান্তর); Exile	Based on Hell Island by Matthew Reilly. Shane Schofield #3.5	2009
397	268	Gupto Atotayee 01 (গুপ্ত আততায়ী ০১); Secret Assassin	Based on Black Light by Stephen Hunter. A Bob Lee Swagger novel	2009
398	268	Gupto Atotayee 02 (গুপ্ত আততায়ী ০২)	Based on Black Light by Stephen Hunter. A Bob Lee Swagger novel	2009
399	269	Bipode Sohana (বিপদে সোহানা); Sohana in Danger	Thriller short-story collection: "Bipode Sohana" (বিপদে সোহানা) ["Sohana in Danger"]; "Rana-Sohana" (রানা সোহানা); "Khuner Dae" (খুনের দায়) ["The Burden of Death"]; "Khune Pishach" (খুনে পিশাচ) ["Murderous Devil"] (based on For Your Eyes Only by Ian Fleming.); "Bideshi Boigganik" (বিদেশি বৈজ্ঞানিক) ["The Foreign Scientist"]	2009
400	270	Chai Oishwarjo 01 (চাই ঐশ্বর্য ০১); I Want The Riches	Based on The Medusa Stone by Jack Du Brul. A Philip Mercer novel	2009
401	270	Chai Oishwarjo 02 (চাই ঐশ্বর্য ০২)	Based on The Medusa Stone by Jack Du Brul. A Philip Mercer novel	2010
402	271	Swarno Biporjoy 01 (স্বর্ণ বিপর্যয় ০১); Golden Disaster	Based on Dark Watch by Clive Cussler and Jack Du Brul. Oregon Files #3	2010
403	271	Swarno Biporjoy 02 (স্বর্ণ বিপর্যয় ০২)	Based on Dark Watch by Clive Cussler and Jack Du Brul. Oregon Files #3	2010
404	272	Killmaster (কিলমাস্টার)		2010
405	273	Mrityur Ticket (মৃত্যুর টিকেট); Ticket of Death	Based on Speed 2: Cruise Control movie novelization by George Ryan	2010
406	274	Kurukhetra 01 (কুরুক্ষেত্র ০১); War Zone	Based on Lost City by Clive Cussler and Paul Kemprecos. NUMA Files #5	2010
407	274	Kurukhetra 02 (কুরুক্ষেত্র ০২)	Based on Lost City by Clive Cussler and Paul Kemprecos. NUMA Files #5	2010
408	275	Climber (ক্লাইম্বার)	Based on movie Cliffhanger. Novelization of the screenplay by Michael France and Sylvester Stallone	2010
409	276	Agun Niye Khela 01 (আগুন নিয়ে খেলা ০১); Playing with Fire	Based on Treasure of Khan by Clive Cussler and Dirk Cussler. Dirk Pitt #19	2011
410	276	Agun Niye Khela 02 (আগুন নিয়ে খেলা ০২)	Based on Treasure of Khan by Clive Cussler and Dirk Cussler. Dirk Pitt #19	2011
411	277	Moruswargo (মরুস্বর্গ); Desert Heaven		2011
412	278	Shei Kuasha 01 (সেই কুয়াশা ০১); That Kuasha	Crossover novel of Hussain's Masud Rana and Kuasha Series. Based on The Matarese Circle by Robert Ludlum. Matarese Dynasty #1. Espionage thriller	2011
413	278	Shei Kuasha 02 (সেই কুয়াশা ০২)	Crossover novel of Hussain's Masud Rana and Kuasha Series. Based on The Matarese Circle by Robert Ludlum. Matarese Dynasty #1. Espionage thriller	2011
414	279	Terrorist (টেরোরিস্ট)	Based on movie Passenger 57 (1992). Story by Stewart Raffill and Dan Gordon	2012
415	280	Sorbonasher Doot 01 (সর্বনাশের দূত ০১); Emissary of Doom	Based on Plague Ship by Clive Cussler and Jack Du Brul. Oregon Files #5	2012
416	280	Sorbonasher Doot 02 (সর্বনাশের দূত ০২)	Based on Plague Ship by Clive Cussler and Jack Du Brul. Oregon Files #5	2012
417	281	Shuvro Pinjor 01 (শুভ্র পিঞ্জর ০১); White Prison	Based on Ice Hunt by James Rollins. Arctic adventure thriller	2012
418	281	Shuvro Pinjor 02 (শুভ্র পিঞ্জর ০২)	Based on Ice Hunt by James Rollins. Arctic adventure thriller	2012
419	282	Surjosainik 01 (সূর্যসৈনিক ০১); Sun Warrior	Based on Corsair by Clive Cussler and Jack Du Brul. Oregon Files #6	2012
420	282	Surjosainik 02 (সূর্যসৈনিক ০২)	Based on Corsair by Clive Cussler and Jack Du Brul. Oregon Files #6	2012
421	283	Treasure Hunter 01 (ট্রেজার হাণ্টার ০১)	Based on The Vault by Boyd Morrison. Tyler Locke #2	2013
422	283	Treasure Hunter 02 (ট্রেজার হাণ্টার ০২)	Based on The Vault by Boyd Morrison. Tyler Locke #2	2013
423	284	Limelight 01 (লাইমলাইট ০১)	Based on Skeleton Coast by Clive Cussler and Jack Du Brul. Oregon Files #4	2013
424	284	Limelight 02 (লাইমলাইট ০২)	Based on Skeleton Coast by Clive Cussler and Jack Du Brul. Oregon Files #4	2013
425	285	Death Trap 01 (ডেথ ট্র্যাপ ০১)	Based on Ice Station by Matthew Reilly. Shane Schofield #1	2013
426	285	Death Trap 02 (ডেথ ট্র্যাপ ০২)	Based on Ice Station by Matthew Reilly. Shane Schofield #1	2013
427	286	Killer Virus 01 (কিলার ভাইরাস ০১)	Based on Area 7 by Matthew Reilly. Shane Schofield #2	2013
428	286	Killer Virus 02 (কিলার ভাইরাস ০২)	Based on Area 7 by Matthew Reilly. Shane Schofield #2	2013
429	287	Time Bomb (টাইম বম)	Based on Die Hard with a Vengeance movie novelization by Deborah Chiel	2013
430	288	Adim Atonko (আদিম আতঙ্ক); Primitive Terror	Based on Meg: A Novel of Deep Terror by Steve Alten. Meg #1. Creature-hunting thriller	2014
431	289	Persian Treasure 01 (পার্শিয়ান ট্রেজার ০১)	Based on Spartan Gold by Clive Cussler. Fargo Adventures #1	2014
432	289	Persian Treasure 02 (পার্শিয়ান ট্রেজার ০২)	Based on Spartan Gold by Clive Cussler. Fargo Adventures #1	2014
433	290	Bounty Hunters 01 (বাউন্টি হান্টার্স ০১)	Based on Scarecrow by Matthew Reilly. Shane Schofield #3	2014
434	290	Bounty Hunters 02 (বাউন্টি হান্টার্স ০২)	Based on Scarecrow by Matthew Reilly. Shane Schofield #3	2014
435	291	Mrityudweep (মৃত্যুদ্বীপ); Death Island	Based on Scarecrow and the Army of Thieves by Matthew Reilly. Shane Schofield #4	2014
436	292	Japani Tycoon 01 (জাপানি টাইকুন ০১); Japanese Tycoon	Based on River of Ruin by Jack Du Brul. A Philip Mercer novel	2014
437	292	Japani Tycoon 02 (জাপানি টাইকুন ০২)	Based on River of Ruin by Jack Du Brul. A Philip Mercer novel	2014
438	293	Patokini (পাতকিনী); The Transgressor	Based on The Mayan Secrets by Clive Cussler. Fargo Adventures #5	2015
439	294	Noroker Keet 01 (নরকের কীট ০১); The Insect from Hell	Based on The Storm by Clive Cussler. NUMA Files #10	2015
440	294	Noroker Keet 02 (নরকের কীট ০২)	Based on The Storm by Clive Cussler. NUMA Files #10	2015
441	295	Sharpshooter (শার্পশুটার)	Based on Magnum Force by Mel Valley. A Dirty Harry novel	2015
442	296	Pashobik 01 (পাশবিক ০১); Animalistic	Based on Hunter by James Byron Huggins. Creature-hunting thriller Assistant writer: Qazi Maimur Hussain	2015
443	296	Pashobik 02 (পাশবিক ০২)	Based on Hunter by James Byron Huggins. Creature-hunting thriller Assistant writer: Qazi Maimur Hussain	2015
444	297	Guptosongho (গুপ্তসংঘ); Secret Society	Based on The Blue Ring by A. J. Quinnell. Marcus Creasy #3; Assistant writer: Qazi Maimur Hussain	2015
445	298	Bishnagini (বিষনাগিনী); Poisonous Snake	Based on Message from Hell by A. J. Quinnell. Marcus Creasy #5; Assistant writer: Qazi Maimur Hussain	2016
446	299	Neel Rokto (নীল রক্ত); Blue Blood	Based on The Hunt for Atlantis by Andy McDermott. Nina Wilde & Eddie Chase #1; Assistant writer: Qazi Maimur Hussain	2016
446.5	299.5	Ontoray Paap (অন্তরে পাপ); Sin in the heart	50 years celebration of Masud Rana Series. Story published in Rahasya Patrika.	2016
447	300	Duranto Koishor (দুরন্ত কৈশোর); Restless Adolescence	Based on SilverFin by Charlie Higson. Young Bond #1. [Golden Jubilee book, 50 years celebration of Masud Rana Series] Assistant writer: Ismail Arman	2016
448	301	Mrityughanta (মৃত্যুঘন্টা); Bell of Death	Based on The Eden Prophecy by Graham Brown. Hawker & Laidlaw #3; Assistant writer: Qazi Maimur Hussain	2016
449	302	Isatabur Obhishap (ইসাটাবুর অভিশাপ); Curse of Isatabu	Based on The Solomon Curse by Clive Cussler. Fargo Adventures #7; Assistant writer: Sayem Solaiman	2016
450	303	Mastermind (মাস্টারমাইণ্ড)	Based on The Sacred Vault by Andy McDermott. Nina Wilde & Eddie Chase #6; Assistant writer: Qazi Maimur Hussain	2017
451	304	Maya Mondir (মায়া মন্দির); Mayan Temple	Based very loosely on Black Sun by Graham Brown. Hawker & Laidlaw #2; Assistant writer: Qazi Maimur Hussain	2017
452	305	Kalo Kuasha (কালো কুয়াশা); Black Fog	Based on The Pharaoh's Secret by Clive Cussler. NUMA Files #13; Assistant writer: Sayem Solaiman	2017
453	306	Dharmaguru (ধর্মগুরু); Mystic	Based on The Cult Of Osiris a.k.a. The Pyramid of Doom by Andy McDermott. Nina Wilde & Eddie Chase #5; Assistant writer: Qazi Maimur Hussain	2017
454	307	Norposhu (নরপশু); Brute	Based on The Doomsday Prophecy by Scott Mariani. Ben Hope #3; Assistant writer: Qazi Maimur Hussain	2018
455	308	Duratma (দুরাত্মা); Wicked	Based loosely on Trigger Mortis by Anthony Horowitz. A James Bond novel Assistant writer: Ismail Arman	2018
456	309	Top Terror (টপ টেরর)	Assistant writer: Qazi Maimur Hussain	2018
457	310	Guptobidya (গুপ্তবিদ্যা); Secret Knowledge	Based on The Alchemist's Secret by Scott Mariani. Ben Hope #1; Assistant writer: Sayem Solaiman	2018
458	311	Mohaplabon (মহাপ্লাবন); Great Flood	Based on The Rising Sea by Clive Cussler. NUMA Files #15; Assistant writer: Qazi Maimur Hussain	2018
459	312	Antaryami (অন্তর্যামী); Indweller	Based on Runner by Patrick Lee (novelist). Sam Dryden #1; Assistant writer: Ismail Arman	2019
460	313	Dark Medusa (ডার্ক মেডিউসা)	Based on The Lost Relic by Scott Mariani, Ben Hope #6; Assistant writer: Qazi Maimur Hussain	2019
461	314	Opposhokti (অপশক্তি); Evilforce	Based on The Martyr's Curse by Scott Mariani, Ben Hope #11; Assistant writer: Qazi Maimur Hussain	2019
462	315	Ex Agent (এক্স এজেণ্ট)	Based on The Moscow Cipher by Scott Mariani, Ben Hope #17; Assistant writer: Qazi Maimur Hussain	2019
463	316	Chayaghatok (ছায়াঘাতক); Shadowhunter	Based on The Heretic's Treasure by Scott Mariani, Ben Hope #4; Assistant writer: Qazi Maimur Hussain	2020
464	317	Stranger (স্ট্রেঞ্জার)	Based on The Rebel's Revenge by Scott Mariani, Ben Hope #18; Assistant writer: Qazi Maimur Hussain	2020
465	318	Count Cobra (কাউণ্ট কোবরা)	Based on The Mozart Conspiracy by Scott Mariani, Ben Hope #2; Assistant writer: Qazi Maimur Hussain	2021
466	319	Dhongshojogyo (ধ্বংসযজ্ঞ); Destruction	Based on Devil's Gate by Clive Cussler and Graham Brown. NUMA Files #9; Assistant writer: Ismail Arman	2021
467	320	Shockwave (শকওয়েভ)	Based on The Nemesis Program by Scott Mariani. Ben Hope #9 Assistant writer: Duke John	2021
468	321	Swarnolipsa (স্বর্ণলিপ্সা) Greed for gold	Based on The Pretender’s Gold by Scott Mariani. Ben Hope #21 Assistant writer: Qazi Maimur Hussain	2021
469	322	Killing Mission (কিলিং মিশন)	Based on The Demon Club by Scott Mariani. Ben Hope #22 Writer: Qazi Maimur Hussain	2022
470	323	Kaalbela (কালবেলা) Inauspicious Time	Based on The Forgotten Holocaust by Scott Mariani. Ben Hope #10 Writer: Qazi Maimur Hussain	2023
471	324	Noroker Shohor (নরকের শহর) The city of hell	Writer: Qazi Maimur Hussain	2024
472	325	Black List (ব্ল্যাক লিস্ট)	Writer: Qazi Maimur Hussain	2024
473	326	Moronchobol (মরণছোবল) Fatal Bite	Qazi Anwar Hussain's Final Masud Rana Story and Four Novellas by R.M. Lytton	2024
474	327	Dirty Game (ডার্টি গেম)	Based on The Condemned (Movie Novelization) by Rob Hedden. Writer: Qazi Maimur Hussain	2025
475	328	Ashanisanket (অশনিসংকেত) The Ominous Signal	Writer: Ismail Arman	2026
