= Vulcan's Forge =

Vulcan's Forge may refer to:

- Vulcan's Forge, a vent in the Uinkaret volcanic field in Arizona, USA
- The Forge of Vulcan (Vasari), a 1564 painting by Giorgio Vasari
- Vulcan's Forge (horse), American Thoroughbred racehorse
- Star Trek: Vulcan's Forge, a 1997 novel by Josepha Sherman and Susan Shwartz, based on a fictional location of the same name in the Star Trek setting.
- Vulcan's Forge (novel), a 1998 novel by Jack Du Brul
