= The Forge of Vulcan =

The Forge of Vulcan may refer to:

- "The Forge of Vulcan", a track on Quark, Strangeness and Charm
- The Forge of Vulcan (Vasari), a painting by Giorgio Vasari
