= Charon's Landing =

1999 novel by Jack Du Brul

- First edition
- Author: Jack Du Brul
- Language: English
- Series: Philip Mercer novels
- Genre: Adventure, techno-thriller novel
- Publisher: Forge Books
- Publication date: 1999
- Publication place: United States
- Media type: Print
- Pages: 384
- ISBN: 978-0-312-868161
- OCLC: 62866665
- Preceded by: Vulcan's Forge
- Followed by: The Medusa Stone

Charon's Landing is an adventure novel by Jack Du Brul, published in 1999 by Forge Books. It is the second book featuring the author's primary protagonist, Philip Mercer.

== Plot ==
On a fishing trip near Homer, Alaska, geologist and mining consultant Philip Mercer joins Howard Small, a professor developing a compact tunnel-boring machine, and members of the Small family. The group discovers the burned-out fishing vessel "Jenny IV" drifting at sea. Mercer boards the wreck and retrieves a fragment from a damaged metal tank. Subsequent investigation identifies it as part of a liquid-nitrogen container. The discovery attracts the attention of former Soviet intelligence officer Ivan Kerikov, whose agents kill the two other men who discovered the wreck and later abduct and murder Howard Small. Mercer becomes the remaining witness to the discovery.

Meanwhile, the President of the United States introduces an energy policy intended to end the country's dependence on foreign oil within ten years. The plan includes opening the Arctic National Wildlife Refuge to oil exploration, prompting protests from environmental groups. Mercer encounters environmental activist Aggie Johnston during a university lecture, where the two debate the environmental consequences of mining and industrial development. Their disagreement develops into a romantic relationship.

Mercer's investigation leads him to suspect that liquid nitrogen is being used to sabotage the Trans-Alaska Pipeline System. Kerikov, who heads a clandestine Soviet organisation known as Department 7, is attempting to implement a Cold War-era plan called Charon's Landing, originally devised to cripple the United States' economic capabilities. He recruits Jan Voerhoven, leader of the environmental organisation Planetary Environment Action League (PEAL), and manipulates its members into helping install concealed liquid-nitrogen containers around sections of the pipeline. The activists believe they are merely trying to stop the transportation of oil, unaware of the wider destructive operation. Kerikov also employs a computer programmer to gain access to the pipeline's control systems.

The operation is financed by Hasaan bin-Rufti, the petroleum minister of Ajman, who intends to use the crisis in the United States as an opportunity to stage a coup in the United Arab Emirates, with support from Iran and Iraq. Max Johnston, Aggie's father and head of Petromax Oil, becomes involved by allowing Kerikov access to company vessels and financial resources. Kerikov and bin-Rufti nevertheless intend to betray Johnston and make him bear responsibility for the resulting disaster. They kidnap Aggie to prevent her father from exposing the operation. Mercer and Aggie are eventually held aboard an offshore oil platform but manage to escape using an emergency escape pod.

Mercer works to frustrate Kerikov's attempts to take control of the pipeline through its computer systems. The conspiracy also involves an attack on the oil tanker "Petromax Arctica", which is intended to be sunk in Pudget Sound to cause a major oil spill and further undermine the President's energy policy. Mercer joins forces with American military personnel to prevent a larger disaster, although the operation results in oil spills in Alaska and Pudget Sound.

Following clues connecting Petromax's shipping operations to bin-Rufti, Mercer travels to the United Arab Emirates, where he works with government minister Khalid al-Khuddari and Colonel Wayne Bigelow. They discover that another tanker, "Southern Accent", formerly known as "Petromax Arabia", is being used to conceal troops intended to support bin-Rufti's coup. With American assistance, the operation is stopped, preventing the planned takeover and the wider alliance involving Iran and Iraq.

After the conspiracy is exposed, Max Johnston dies by suicide following an FBI investigation. Aggie inherits his estate and control of Petromax and intends to change the company from within. She and Mercer resume their relationship. However, the novel's final revelation indicates that Kerikov survived and remains at large.

== Characters ==
- Philip Mercer, geologist
- Aggie Johnston, environmentalist
