= Fulcanelli =

French alchemist and esoteric writer (fl. 1920s)

Fulcanelli (fl. 1920s) was the name used by a French alchemist and esoteric writer, whose identity is still debated. The name Fulcanelli seems to be a play on words: Vulcan, the ancient Roman god of fire, plus El, a Canaanite name for God and so the Sacred Fire.

The appeal of Fulcanelli as a cultural phenomenon is due partly to the mystery of most aspects of his life and works, and his disappearance. In particular, he is reputed to have twice performed a transmutation of lead into gold. The first was in 1922, together with his most devoted pupil Eugène Canseliet, when the two supposedly performed a successful transmutation of 100 grams of lead into gold in the presence of Julien Champagne and Gaston Sauvage. This demonstration took place in a laboratory of the gas works of the Georgi company at Sarcelles, and was achieved with the use of a small quantity of "Projection Powder" (also known as the Philosopher's Stone) prepared by Fulcanelli. The second was in 1937 at the Château de Léré, when Fulcanelli supposedly performed a transmutation of 225 grams of lead into gold and 100 grams of silver into uranium before witnesses including a chemist, two physicists and a geologist. After this, Fulcanelli disappeared completely.

== Life ==
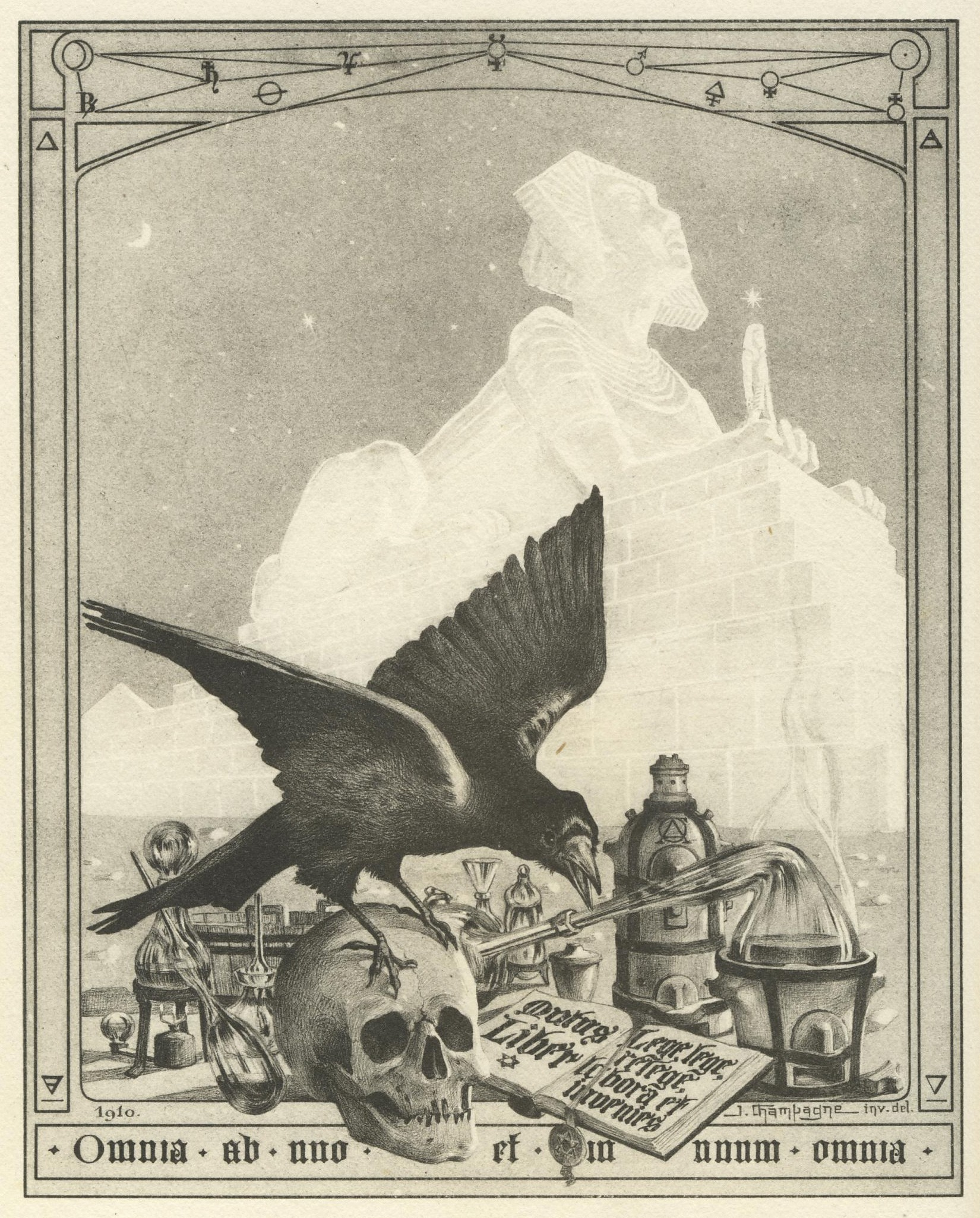
Frontispice of Le Mystère des Cathédrales by Fulcanelli (1926). Illustration by Julien Champagne.

Fulcanelli was likely a Frenchman educated in the ways of alchemical lore, architecture, art, science, and languages. Fulcanelli wrote two books that were published after his disappearance in 1926, having left his magnum opus, Le Mystère des Cathédrales, with his only student, Eugène Canseliet. Its first edition consisted of 300 copies and was published by Jean Schemit at 52 Rue Laffitte, Paris.

Theories about Fulcanelli speculate that he was one or another famous French occultist of the time: perhaps a member of the former royal family, the House of Valois, or another member of the Frères d'Heliopolis (Brothers of Heliopolis, a society centred around Fulcanelli which included Eugène Canseliet, Jean-Julien Champagne, and Jules Boucher). Patrick Rivière, a student of Canseliet's, believed that Fulcanelli's true identity was Jules Violle, a famous French physicist. In a 1996 book, samples of writing by Jean-Julien Hubert Champagne (born January 23, 1877) and Fulcanelli are compared, and show considerable similarity. In any event, by 1916, Fulcanelli had accepted Canseliet, who was then only sixteen, as his first student. During 1921, he accepted the sons of Ferdinand de Lesseps as students and in 1922 two more students: Jules Boucher and Gaston Sauvage. In 1925, Fulcanelli relocated to 59 rue Rochechouart where he allegedly succeeded in transmuting base metals into gold.

However, most of the testimonies compiled in its historical context, between 1910 and 1940, always designate Julien Champagne as the author, either unique or inspired by the materials of the librarian Pierre Dujols (1862-1926). The first reference to the pseudonym dates from around 1910 and is due to Jeanne-Emilie Baheux de Puysieux (1829-1914), wife of the sculptor Auguste Bartholdi (1834-1904).

In 1960, with the publication of the international bestseller The Morning of the Magicians, Pauwels and Bergier popularized the mystery of the Master Alchemist.

=== Fulcanelli's Master ===
Without neglecting the belief of some researchers that Canseliet himself could have been Fulcanelli, Canseliet himself believed Fulcanelli's Master was Basil Valentine, an alchemist of the 15th century; the theoretical Master at least, for Fulcanelli's initiator may have been his own wife. As Fulcanelli describes in a strange letter he kept as a talisman about the completion of the Great Work – by someone who is presumably Basil Valentine – he also mentions his own wife: "...When my wife told me the good news" and "...my wife, with the inexplicable intuition of sensitives, had a really strange dream." As shown by this letter, when referring to something as important as the Great Work, he mentions his wife as someone important to the Magnum Opus.

=== Conclusion ===
According to Louis Pauwels, Fulcanelli survived World War II and disappeared completely after the Liberation of Paris. Every attempt to find him failed. In August 1945, American G-2 (Army Intelligence) asked Jacques Bergier to contact a certain army major who was in charge of the operation of searching for German research reports on atomic energy. The major, whose identity was apparently anonymous, or simply forgotten, wanted to know the whereabouts of Fulcanelli. Bergier could not say and the army major seemed satisfied Fulcanelli could not be found.

== Meeting in Paris with Jacques Bergier ==
Walter Lang reports that Fulcanelli communicated with Jacques Bergier to warn French atomic physicist André Helbronner of man's impending use of nuclear weapons. According to Fulcanelli, nuclear weapons had been used before, by and against humanity. Prof. Helbronner and Chevillon, among others, were assassinated by the Gestapo towards the end of World War II.

The meeting between Jacques Bergier and Fulcanelli reportedly occurred during June 1937 in a laboratory of the Gas Board in Paris. According to Neil Powell, the following is a translation of the original verbatim transcript of the rendezvous:

"You're on the brink of success, as indeed are several others of our scientists today. Please, allow me. Be very very careful. I warn you... The liberation of nuclear power is easier than you think and the radioactivity artificially produced can poison the atmosphere of our planet in a very short time: a few years. Moreover, atomic explosives can be produced from a few grains of metal powerful enough to destroy whole cities. I'm telling you this for a fact: the alchemists have known it for a very long time... I shall not attempt to prove to you what I'm now going to say but I ask you to repeat it to Mr. Helbronner: certain geometrical arrangements of highly purified materials are enough to release atomic forces without having recourse to either electricity or vacuum techniques... The secret of alchemy is this: there is a way of manipulating matter and energy so as to produce what modern scientists call 'a field of force'. The field acts on the observer and puts him in a privileged position vis-à-vis the universe. From this position he has access to the realities which are ordinarily hidden from us by time and space, matter and energy. This is what we call the Great Work."

When Bergier asked Fulcanelli about the Philosopher's Stone, the alchemist answered: "...the vital thing is not the transmutation of metals but that of the experimenter himself. It is an ancient secret that a few people rediscover each century. Unfortunately, only a handful are successful..."

In December 1938, the German chemists Otto Hahn and Fritz Strassmann sent a manuscript to Naturwissenschaften reporting they had detected the element barium after bombarding uranium with neutrons. Lise Meitner and her nephew Otto Robert Frisch correctly interpreted these results as being nuclear fission.

== Rendezvous in Spain ==
According to Canseliet, his last encounter with Fulcanelli happened in 1953 (years after his disappearance), when he went to Spain and there was taken to a castle high in the mountains for a rendezvous with his former master. Canseliet had known Fulcanelli as an old man in his 80s but now the Master had grown younger and had physically changed in appearance: he was now an androgynous creature, a being Fulcanelli called The Divine Androgyne. The reunion was brief and Fulcanelli once again disappeared not leaving any trace of his whereabouts.

== The Phonetic Cabala ==
According to Fulcanelli, the Phonetic Cabala (Fulcanelli's term for a special use of language, drawing on phonetic similarities and other symbolic techniques for expanding the expressive reach of words) is not the Hebrew Kabbalah; even the derivation is different: Cabala is derived from the Latin caballus, a horse, as in the Horse of Troy in the Iliad. It is basically homophonic and symphonic rather than numerical; it is based on phonetic assonance and resonance to echo The Gay Science in the words of the ancient Greek deities spoken in sacred ancient Greek nomenclature. According to Walter Lang, who wrote an introduction to the English translation of Fulcanelli's Le Mystère des Cathédrales, the basic principles of the Phonetic Cabala are restored in Fulcanelli's Magnum Opus.

== Works ==
The two books by Fulcanelli are

- Le Mystère des Cathédrales (The Mystery of the Cathedrals), written in 1922 and published in Paris in 1926.
- Les Demeures Philosophales (Dwellings of the Philosophers), published in Paris in 1929.

The books are written in a cryptic and erudite manner, replete with Latin and Greek puns, alchemical symbolism, double entendres, and lectures on and in Argot and Cant, all of which serve to keep casual readers ignorant.

A third book, Finis Gloriae Mundi (End of the World's Glory), was also reportedly being prepared for publication. The notes for the book were left for a time with his only student, Canseliet. Fulcanelli decided that the timing for publication of the book was not right and so it was never in fact published. A book by the same name, citing Fulcanelli as the author, was published much later, but has been shown to be a counterfeit.

== Cultural references ==
- River of Ink series by Helen Dennise.
- The mystery thriller novel The Alchemist's Secret by Scott Mariani deals with the subject of the alchemist's disappearance and what may have happened to his manuscript.
- The hunt for Fulcanelli by Allied and Nazi intelligence services during World War Two is a major theme of Martin Langfield's 2009 novel The Secret Fire.
- Frank Zappa released a song titled "But Who Was Fulcanelli?" on his 1988 live guitar solo album, Guitar.
- Michele Soavi's 1989 film La Chiesa (The Church) references Fulcanelli's The Mystery of the Cathedrals throughout.
- Fulcanelli and his death are depicted in Guillermo del Toro's 1993 film Cronos.
- Fulcanelli, a first-season episode of the French TV police series Astrid et Raphaëlle, involves a long treasure hunt for Fulcanelli’s secrets.
