= Pandora's Curse =

2001 novel by Jack Du Brul

- Paperback Edition
- Author: Jack Du Brul
- Language: English
- Series: Philip Mercer novels
- Genre: Adventure, Techno-thriller novel
- Publisher: Onyx
- Publication date: 2001
- Publication place: United States
- Media type: Print Paperback
- Pages: 480 pp (Paperback edition)
- ISBN: 978-0-451-40963-8
- OCLC: 47888357
- LC Class: CPB Box no. 1838 vol. 3
- Preceded by: The Medusa Stone
- Followed by: River of Ruin

Pandora's Curse is an adventure novel by Jack Du Brul. This is the 4th book featuring the author's primary protagonist, Philip Mercer.

== Summary ==
During World War II, at a secret Nazi submarine base, containers crafted entirely from looted wartime gold were hidden away.

In the unforgiving wastes of Greenland, geologist Philip Mercer uncovers a long - abandoned U.S. Army base buried under the ice - and a long-dead body still hot with radiation. Before Mercer and his colleague, the seductive Dr. Anika Klein, can investigate further, a flash fire engulfs the base, and they are ordered to evacuate. But their plane is forced to land when a bomb is discovered on board, and they must seek shelter from the murderous weather in a hidden ice cavern.

That's where they learn the startling truth. A powerful German corporation has launched an operation to destroy evidence of its Nazi past. But one of the corporate mercenaries knows what's inside the Pandora's boxes, and he plans to hold the entire world hostage - unless Mercer can find a way to stop him....
