= River of Ruin =

Novel by Jack Du Brul

- Paperback Edition
- Author: Jack Du Brul
- Language: English
- Series: Philip Mercer novels
- Genre: Adventure, Techno-thriller novel
- Publisher: Onyx
- Publication date: 2002
- Publication place: United States
- Media type: Print Paperback
- Pages: 544 pp (Paperback edition)
- ISBN: 978-0-451-41054-2
- OCLC: 51054985
- LC Class: CPB Box no. 2138 vol. 12
- Preceded by: Pandora's Curse
- Followed by: Deep Fire Rising

River of Ruin is an adventure novel by Jack Du Brul. This is the 5th book featuring the author's primary protagonist, Philip Mercer.
