= Edward S. Aarons =

American writer

- Born: September 11, 1916; Philadelphia, Pennsylvania, U.S.
- Died: June 16, 1975 (aged 58); New Milford, Connecticut, U.S.
- Education: Columbia University (BA)
- Writing career
- Notable work: Assignment series

Edward Sidney Aarons (September 11, 1916 – June 16, 1975) was an American writer who authored more than 80 novels from 1936 until 1975. One of these was under the pseudonym "Paul Ayres" (Dead Heat), and 30 were written using the name "Edward Ronns". He also wrote stories for detective magazines, such as Detective Story Magazine and Scarab.

Aarons also wrote spy thrillers, including his "Assignment" series, which are set all over the world and have been translated into 17 languages. The 42 novels in this series starred CIA agent Sam Durell. The first "Assignment" novel was written in 1955, and Aarons continued writing the series until up to his death.

== Early life ==
Aarons was born in Philadelphia, Pennsylvania, and earned a degree in Literature and History from Columbia University. He worked at various jobs to put himself through college, including jobs as a newspaper reporter and fisherman. In 1933, he won a short story contest as a student. In World War II he was in the United States Coast Guard, joining after the attack on Pearl Harbor in 1941. He finished his duty in 1945, having obtained the rank of Chief Petty Officer.

== Bibliography ==
=== As Edward S. Aarons ===
- Nightmare (1948)
- Escape to Love (1952)
- Come Back, My Love (1953)
- The Sinners (1953)
- Girl on the Run (1954)
- The Defenders (1961)

=== As Edward S. Aarons - The Assignment series ===
Fictional CIA agent Sam Durell is the protagonist for all of the stories in this series. Though the publisher listed these as the “Assignment series”, it is just as well known as the “Sam Durell series". In later editions, the publisher also used “Sam Durell” in the blurb immediately after the front cover - For example, Assignment Ceylon has “This is number thirty-six of the famed Sam Durell novels—one of the bestselling suspense series in the history of publishing.” One consistent element is that all of the story titles started with the word “Assignment.”

The stories were written over a span of 28 years, from 1955 to 1983. Each book set, more or less, in the time it was written.

When initially issued the stories were not numbered and the publisher showed the list of available stories in the “Assignment” series in alphabetical order though often the alphabetical list did not include all of the previous stories. Later re-prints numbered the stories based the order in which they were first published though the list of stories just before the title page was still in alphabetical order. The list is shown in numbered/published order here. Each story is a standalone work and while they can be read in any order reading them in the order given here will provide some continuity as there are occasional references to people or incidents from previous assignments.

The publications were inconsistent in their formatting of the title. For consistency, all of the titles are listed here with a hyphen.

1. Assignment to Disaster (1955)
2. Assignment—Treason (1956)
3. Assignment—Suicide (1956)
4. Assignment—Stella Marni (1957)
5. Assignment—Budapest (1957)
6. Assignment—Angelina (1958)
7. Assignment—Madeleine (1958)
8. Assignment—Carlotta Cortez (1959)
9. Assignment—Helene (1959)
10. Assignment—Lili Lamaris (1959)
11. Assignment—Zoraya (1960)
12. Assignment—Mara Tirana (1960)
13. Assignment—Lowlands (1961)
14. Assignment—Burma Girl (1961)
15. Assignment—Ankara (1961)
16. Assignment—Karachi (1962)
17. Assignment—Sorrento Siren (1962)
18. Assignment—Manchurian Doll (1963)
19. Assignment—The Girl in the Gondola (1964)
20. Assignment—Sulu Sea (1964)
21. Assignment—The Cairo Dancers (1965)
22. Assignment—School for Spies (1966)
23. Assignment—Cong Hai Kill (1966)
24. Assignment—Palermo (1966)
25. Assignment—Black Viking (1967)
26. Assignment—Moon Girl (1967)
27. Assignment—Nuclear Nude (1968)
28. Assignment—Peking (1969)
29. Assignment—White Rajah (1970)
30. Assignment—Star Stealers (1970)
31. Assignment—Tokyo (1971)
32. Assignment—Golden Girl (1971)
33. Assignment—Bangkok (1972)
34. Assignment—Maltese Maiden (1972)
35. Assignment—Silver Scorpion (1973)
36. Assignment—Ceylon (1973)
37. Assignment—Amazon Queen (1974)
38. Assignment—Sumatra (1974)
39. Assignment—Quayle Question (1975)
40. Assignment—Black Gold (1975)
41. Assignment—Unicorn (1976)
42. Assignment—Afghan Dragon (1976)

After Edward S. Aarons' death in 1975, his brother, William B. Aarons (1914–2002), continued to publish the series as executor of the Edward S. Aarons' estate. Volumes 43 to 48 (1 - 6 below) state Will B. Aarons as the author but were ghost written by Lawrence Hall.

1. Assignment—Sheba (1976)
2. Assignment—Tiger Devil (1977)
3. Assignment—13th Princess (1977)
4. Assignment—Mermaid (1979)
5. Assignment—Tyrant's Bride (1980)
6. Assignment—Death Ship (1983)

=== As Paul Ayres ===
- Dead Heat (1950)

=== As Edward Ronns ===
- Death in a Lighthouse (1938) (Also published as: The Cowl of Doom [(1946])
- Murder Money (1938) (Also published as: $1,000,000 in Corpses [(1943])
- The Corpse Hangs High (1939)
- No Place to Live (1947) (Also published as: Lady, the Guy Is Dead [(1950])
- Terror in the Town (1947)
- Gift of Death (1948)
- The Art Studio Murders (1950)
- Catspaw Ordeal (1950)
- Dark Memory (1950)
- Million Dollar Murder (1950)
- State Department Murders (1950)
- The Decoy (1951)
- I Can't Stop Running (1951)
- Don't Cry, Beloved (1952)
- Passage to Terror (1952)
- Dark Destiny (1953)
- The Net (1953)
- Say It with Murder (1954)
- They All Ran Away (1955)
- Deadly Curves (1956)
- Design for Death (1956)
- Point of Peril (1956)
- Death Is My Shadow (1957)
- Pickup Alley (1957)
- Gang Rumble (1958)
- The Lady Takes a Flyer (1958)
- The Big Bedroom (1959)
- The Black Orchid (1959) (as Edward S. Ronns)
- But Not for Me (1959)
- The Glass Cage (1962)
