= The Medusa Stone =

2000 novel by Jack Du Brul

- Paperback Edition
- Author: Jack Du Brul
- Language: English
- Series: Philip Mercer novels
- Genre: Adventure, Techno-thriller novel
- Publisher: Onyx
- Publication date: 2000
- Publication place: United States
- Media type: Print paperback
- Pages: 464 pp (paperback edition)
- ISBN: 978-0-451-40922-5
- OCLC: 43842044
- LC Class: CPB Box no. 1901 vol. 16
- Preceded by: Charon's Landing
- Followed by: Pandora's Curse

The Medusa Stone is an adventure novel by Jack Du Brul. This is the third book featuring the author’s primary protagonist, Phillip Mercer.

== Plot introduction ==
Ten years ago, the spy satellite Medusa burned upon re-entry-but not before its sensors revealed a secret buried deep in the Earth hidden for thousands of years from the eyes of humanity. A priceless discovery that some would die to find - and kill to possess...

With his talent as a geologist and a quick intelligence matched by savvy and courage, Phillip Mercer is fast becoming a legend in powerful circles around the world. And at least two groups in those circles need his help. When one of them snatches and holds his oldest friend, Mercer is forced to act by the kidnappers...whose allegiance is a mystery, but whose viciousness is not.

In a harsh and hostile land ravaged by violence, Mercer races to find the one thing that will save his friend. But the location of this ancient treasure is elusive. He is thwarted by brutal competing forces and, suddenly, he learns that there is much more at stake then either his life or the life of an old friend: the fate of thousands of innocent souls depends on him and him alone...
