= Duncan Kyle =

English thriller writer (1930–2000)

John Franklin Broxholme (11 June 1930 Bradford – 24 June 2000 Bury St Edmunds) was an English thriller writer who published fifteen novels in a little over twenty years (1971–1993) using the pen name of Duncan Kyle.

Reminiscent of the work of Desmond Bagley, Kyle's books typically involve a tough, resourceful individual who unexpectedly becomes involved in danger and intrigue in an exotic setting. A Cage of Ice, for example, involves a London physician who accompanies a hand-picked team of adventurers on a snowmobile journey across the Arctic to rescue a defecting Soviet scientist. Green River High follows another group of adventurers into the jungles of Borneo in search of a plane that crashed there during World War II. Kyle's novels are, like those of Bagley and Alistair MacLean, stronger on plot and setting than on characterization. They are invariably well-crafted, however, and two—The King's Commissar and The Dancing Men—are classics of the historical fiction and historical detective story genres, respectively.

== Notable works ==
A Cage of Ice

In A Cage of Ice, a British doctor living in New York, receives a mystery package addressed to Professor Ed Ward. His name is Doctor Edwards. Upon receiving the parcel, there are attempts on his life. He escapes the murderers and begins to look for Mr. Ed Ward. Soon, he is "kidnapped" by an agent of the US government. He is informed of who Professor Ed Ward is, and is sent on a mission to the Arctic along with an international cast of highly professional personages.

The following is from "New and Noteworthy" by Patricia T. O'Conner; 15 February 1987, The New York Times.

The C.I.A. airlifts a team into the Arctic to rescue a Russian scientist held prisoner at a remote, frozen outpost in the Soviet Union. Duncan Kyle's novel has "a few special twists" that are "worth waiting for", Thomas Lask said in The Times in 1971. He called it "a good tight thriller that provides first-rate armchair excitement with a tension that doesn't let up until the last page."

Flight into Fear

John Shaw is a freelance pilot working for the company Airflo. He is told by his boss, John Lennox, to deliver a parcel in San Francisco, and pick up a customer. This passenger is supposed to be kept secret from everybody. Shaw arrives in San Francisco, is kidnapped, and taken to a Chinese restaurant. He meets up with an anti-narcotics agent. Later, Shaw and his passenger evade their pursuers through the San Francisco bay. Eventually, they reach the plane and head to England. Along the way, the aeroplane is hijacked and has numerous malfunctions. Shaw discovers, upon arriving in England, his passenger is not who he thought, and climaxes with a dizzying cat and mouse chase.

The Suvarov Adventure (also released as A Raft of Swords)

The following is from the back of the book.

As plans go ahead for an International Peace Conference in Vancouver, a number of shadowy, unrelated characters head towards the Canadian shore.

They include:

A Greek shipping magnate with Russian connections

A British expert on 'mini-subs'

A team of frogmen with exaggerated 'American' accents

The head of the Russian sections of British Intelligence

When six Sword nuclear missiles are dislodged from the floor of the ocean, the scene is set from some desperate international intrigue...

Terror's Cradle

The following is from the back of the book.

In Las Vegas, journalist John Sellers, on a routine assignment to interview a movie star. is run out of town after a threat on his life.

In Gothenburg, Alison, the girl he plans to marry, disappears with a vital piece of microfilm, leaving clues that only Sellers can understand.

In Shetland, hunted by helicopter and powerboat, he pits his wits against both CIA and KGB as he barters desperately for Alison's life...

Whiteout (also released as In Deep)

The following is from the summary on the back of the book.

Camp Hundred lay a hundred miles from nowhere in one of the coldest and most dangerous places on earth. And to this strange, hostile world high above the Arctic Circle Harry Bowes had come to test the TK4—the most advanced hovercraft ever built—and walked into a nightmare on ice.

Isolated, dependent on technology for survival, 300 hand-picked soldiers had been battling the freezing weather, the loneliness, the fear. And now they were losing ... as one by one they began to die.

Outside the camp raged a lethal blizzard, but Bowes suspected a more deadly enemy waited within. And there was no escape ... except in a chilling race for survival against the merciless Arctic and a cold, brutal killer.

Black Camelot

The following is from "Reviving the Story-Telling Art", Time, 30 October 1978.

Black Camelot is all Kyle guile. The novel is set in the waning months of World War II, when the Third Reich's slimier survivors are engaged in a last-ditch struggle.

The Nazis' scheme is to smuggle to the Soviets lists of Britons who have supported the German war effort. Their hope is to inflame Stalin's deep distrust of his allies. The plan goes agley when the documents, hand-carried to Sweden, are used instead to blackmail English industrialists.

Kyle's antihero is 35-year-old Hauptsturmführer Franz Rasch, a much decorated Waffen SS commando. Assigned to deliver the lists in Stockholm, he is betrayed by his bosses. His trail leads to neutral Ireland and England and finally back to Germany. There the disillusioned Rasch attempts to capture vital files from Schloss Wewelsburg, the Black Camelot that Himmler assembled as a Teutonic perversion of King Arthur's court. In one of the best siege narratives since The Guns of Navarone, Rasch and other embittered SS men infiltrate the monstrous castle at the same time that it is being destroyed on Himmler's orders.

Happy endings are not the Kyle style. But time is a great provider. Today, the author informs us, the castle has been reconstructed as a youth hostel. Such truths are comforting; but it is fiction like Black Camelot that makes history live.

Stalking Point From the back of the book:

The Mission: Assassinate FDR and Churchill at their top secret meeting aboard the battleship Prince of Wales.

The Plan: Commandeer the specially designed and lethal seaplane, the Canso—and take it on a suicide mission for the glory of Der Führer.

The Men: Ernie Miller, America's top acrobatics pilot, with the skill to fly low, fast, and deadly ... blackmailed into choosing between his country and the woman he loves. Von Galen, the ruthless German diplomat obsessed with being the man who can win the war for Hitler. Alec Ross, crack test pilot, in an airborne race to stop his best friend from turning traitor ... by shooting him down.

The Semonov Impulse

This was also written under the pseudonym James Meldrum. From the back of the book:

Josef Budzinski was a man of impulse ... a man obsessed ... a hot-headed hunter of war criminals. Now his prize was within reach: Joachim Schmidt, the Butcher of Leyerhausen, en route to Rome on an Aeroflot jet. It was an impulse that triggered the hijack plan ... another that set him on a desperate run for his life. Now one more might redeem him and place his hated quarry in his hands ... It was the most dangerous impulse of all.

The King's Commissar

The following is from Seymour Epstein, The New York Times; 20 May 1984.

The downfall of Russia's Czar Nicholas, the Bolshevik takeover and all the murky, bloody doings in that corner of history are, and probably will remain, as irresistible to novelists as catnip to cats. Duncan Kyle, a British practitioner of the suspense genre, has peeked once again into that corner with convoluted but engaging results. Although the novel is set in the present, it revolves around a plot initiated in 1917 by Britain's King George V and the nefarious Sir Basil Zaharoff to rescue Czar Nicholas from the hands of the Bolsheviks. For their purpose they employed an English naval officer, whose background made him as fluent in Russian as he was in English, to offer $:50-million to the harried Bolsheviks to save the Czar. Mr. Kyle's tale alternates between the details of this plot (revealed through excerpts from the memoirs of the naval officer) and current events in the English banking house that is still paying out $:50,000 a year to an account in a Swiss bank, with no questions asked. This sum has been paid out since 1920 even though Sir Basil died in 1936. The British bank executives, in their inimitable way, have never questioned the practice, but a new American partner does question it and thereby sets into motion events that have been lying dormant for almost 50 years. The mission to Moscow, the Czar's immense gold treasure, the intrigues and passions surrounding the capture of the royal family, and the devilishly clever ruse the English naval officer uses to get both revenge and a final airing of his story are all revealed in rococo detail. Sometimes the turns become a bit too rococo, but a sense of humor and a poignant sense of history combine to give The King's Commissar a tense, sustained fascination.

The Dancing Men

The following is by John Gross, Books of the Times. The New York Times. 22 August 1986.

In The Dancing Men, on the other hand, the plot is emphatically what counts. Most of the characterization is no more than adequate, and there are some hefty implausibilities, but Duncan Kyle keeps your curiosity simmering away too effectively for you to mind very much.

The background is political, with nothing less than the Presidency itself at stake. A new candidate enters the lists, radiating charisma – a natural choice, it would seem, for his party's nomination. But you can't be too careful, and his advisers decide to check out everything about him, including an Irish grandfather about whom almost nothing is known. A genealogist is put on the trail, so discreetly that when the man who hired him is killed in a car crash the other advisers don't know how to contact him. But what they do know is that he has begun to unearth a series of ever-deepening scandals.

Both the genealogist's hunt for the truth and the politicians' hunt for the genealogist yield some exciting twists, in a plot that zigzags halfway round the world. Toward the end of the story, though, there is a certain running out of steam, as the chief villain turns out to be a bit too melodramatic even by the prevailing standards.

The Honey Ant

From the back of the book:

The yellowed envelope goes to John Close, a young Perth solicitor. The Green estate, eighty square miles of priceless land in Western Australia, has been left to Captain Strutt who lives on the other side of the world in England. For John Close, it should be another routine matter. For Strutt—tough, resolute, touchy – it could be a dream come true. But for both of them it quickly turns into a dance with death, as mysterious and dangerous opponents try to thwart the terms of the Will. As they struggle to unravel the knot that is stitched tight around Stringer Station, sixty years of remote tranquility erupt into a brutal, terrible violence...

Exit

The following is from the jacket cover:

Who was Peterkin? Perth lawyer John Close knew him only as a client: a strange, silent immigrant whom Close had defended twice in court. But now Peterkin's death in prison leaves Close with a mystery to solve. Peterkin has left a bizarre trail of clues, in the form of glazed pottery leaves, that will reveal first his own true identity, then the secret that made him a hunted man for the greater part of his life.

Close follows the carefully laid trail—from Western Australia to London to Yorkshire—a trail going back in time to the great refugee dispersals of the Second World War. He's not the only one interested: there's a remnant of the KGB, angry CIA operative and an unpleasant British SIS agent, all intent on uncovering what Peterkin had hidden so carefully, though no one knows quite what it might be. After a series of breathtaking chases and dramatic escapes, Close discovers the secret—but if anything, the knowledge puts him into an even more dangerous position.

Set against the momentous changes of recent history and building to a set-piece climax of unrelenting tension, Duncan Kyle's thirteenth novel will be welcomed by his many fans as one of his very best.

== Bibliography ==
=== Novels (as Duncan Kyle) ===
- A Cage of Ice (1970)
- Flight Into Fear (1972)
- The Suvarov Adventure (1973) paperback title A Raft of Swords
- Terror's Cradle (1974)
- The Semonov Impulse (1975) originally published using pseudonym "James Meldrum"
- In Deep (1976) paperback title Whiteout!
- Black Camelot (1978)
- Green River High (1979)
- Stalking Point (1981)
- The King's Commissar (1983)
- The Dancing Men (1985)
- The Honey Ant (1988)
- Exit (1993)

=== Novels (as J.F. Broxholme) ===
- The War Queen (1967)

=== Short stories ===
- "The Breathless Hush" – first published in The Rigby File (1989), ed. Tim Heald

=== Non-fiction (as contributor John Franklin Broxholme) ===
- The Practice of Journalism (1968)

=== Non-fiction (uncredited editor) ===
- Stephen Ward Speaks (1963)
