= Scott Mariani =

British Sunday Times bestselling author (born 1968)

Scott Mariani (born 1 January 1968, St Andrews Scotland) is a British Sunday Times bestselling author, best known for his thriller novels about ex-SAS Major and former theology student, Ben Hope. The first of these novels, The Alchemist's Secret, was ranked No.1 in the UK's Amazon Kindle chart for six consecutive weeks.

== Biography ==
Mariani was born in St Andrews in Scotland and studied Modern Languages and Film Studies at Oxford University. He now resides in west Wales, where he first got the idea for the character Ben Hope when out walking. Prior to becoming a full-time writer, he worked in various jobs, including as a translator, professional musician and freelance journalist. He has cited his interests outside of writing to be shooting, archery, photography and astronomy; he is a supporter of the Woodland Trust and the World Wide Fund for Nature.

== Bibliography ==
=== Ben Hope ===
The Ben Hope novels have been described as "James Bond meets Jason Bourne, with a historical twist". The series starts with the lead character (who has left the SAS to become a freelance "consultant" in searching and rescuing children who are kidnap victims) being recruited to try to find Fulcanelli, or at the very least his manuscript, in order to try to save the life of a child. The manuscript in question is purported to contain the secret of the elixir of life.

The use of ancient history, significant historical events, conspiracy theories and myths such as the elixir of life has become a standard theme running through the books, with others revolving around subjects such as the death of Mozart (The Mozart Conspiracy), Die Glocke (The Shadow Project) and the Great Famine of Ireland (The Forgotten Holocaust). His novels have been translated into over 20 languages.

==== Main series ====
- The Alchemist's Secret (aka "The Fulcanelli Manuscript"), 2007, ISBN 1847563406
- The Mozart Conspiracy, 2008, ISBN 1847563414
- The Doomsday Prophecy (aka "The Hope Vendetta"), 2009, ISBN 1847563422
- The Heretic's Treasure, 2009, ISBN 1847563430
- The Shadow Project, 2010, ISBN 0007311907
- The Lost Relic, 2011, ISBN 1847561977
- The Sacred Sword, 2012, ISBN 1847561985
- The Armada Legacy, 2013, ISBN 0007398433
- The Nemesis Program, 2014, ISBN 0007398468
- The Forgotten Holocaust, 2015, ISBN 0007486170
- The Martyr's Curse, 2015, ISBN 0007486189
- The Cassandra Sanction, 2016, ISBN 0007486197
- Star of Africa, 2016, ISBN 0007486200
- The Devil's Kingdom, 2016, ISBN 0007486219
- The Babylon Idol, 2017, ISBN 0007486227
- The Bach Manuscript, 2017, ISBN 0007486235
- The Moscow Cipher, 2018, ISBN 0007486251
- The Rebel's Revenge, 2018, ISBN 0008235929
- Valley of Death, 2019, ISBN 0008235961
- House of War, 2019, ISBN 0008235988
- The Pretender's Gold, 2020, ISBN 0008236011
- The Demon Club, 2020, ISBN 0008365512
- The Pandemic Plot, 2021, ISBN 0008365539
- The Crusader's Cross, 2021, ISBN 0008365555
- The Silver Serpent, 2022, ISBN 0008365571
- Graveyard of Empires, 2022, ISBN 0008505713
- The White Knight, 2023, ISBN 0008505748
- The Tudor Deception, 2023, ISBN 0008601127
- The Templar Secret, 2024, ISBN 978-0008601195
- The Jericho Road, 2027, ISBN 978-0008803858 (forthcoming)

==== Ben Hope short novellas ====
- Passenger 13, 2011, ISBN 9780956922601
- Bring Him Back, 2013, ISBN 0956922643
- The Tunnel, 2015, eBook

=== Other works ===
==== Vampire Federation ====
- Uprising, 2010, ISBN 1847562124
- The Cross, 2011, ISBN 1847562132

==== DI Tom McAllister ====
- The Cage, 2021

==== Will Bowman ====
- The Pilgrim's Revenge, 2025 ISBN 978-1399736756
- The Knight's Pledge, 2025 ISBN 978-1399736831
- Die for a King, 2026 ISBN 978-1399736893
- The Black Eagle, 2026 ISBN 978-1399736923 (forthcoming)

==== Other novellas ====
- House of Malice, 2013, ISBN 0956922635
- Decoy, 2014, eBook

==== Miscellaneous ====
- How to Write a Thriller, 2007, ISBN 1845281632
