= Jack Du Brul =

American author

- Born: October 15, 1968 (age 57); Burlington, Vermont, U.S.
- Education: Westminster School
- Occupation: Author
- Writing career
- Genre: Techno-thriller

Jack Du Brul (born October 15, 1968, in Burlington, Vermont) is an American author who writes techno-thriller novels.

== Early life ==
Du Brul remained in Vermont throughout his childhood. He attended the Westminster School in Connecticut for grades 9 through 12. After college he moved to Florida, where he wrote his first book. He currently lives in Virginia.

== Career ==
Du Brul's novels focus on his character, Dr. Philip Mercer, a successful mining engineer and geologist, who gets involved in various threats to the world. He has written eight Phillip Mercer books in the series, beginning with Vulcan's Forge.

Later, Du Brul co-authored the Oregon Files novels with Clive Cussler, taking over from Craig Dirgo with the third novel. The latest novel, Mirage, was a New York Times bestseller and his last novel in the series. But more recently took on co-authoring the Isaac Bell novels with The Titanic Secret, the 11th.

== Works ==
=== Philip Mercer ===
1. Vulcan's Forge (1998)
2. Charon's Landing (1999)
3. The Medusa Stone (2000)
4. Pandora's Curse (2001)
5. River of Ruin (2002)
6. Deep Fire Rising (2003)
7. Havoc (2006)
8. The Lightning Stones (2015)

=== Oregon Files (with Clive Cussler) ===
1. Dark Watch (2005)
2. Skeleton Coast (2006)
3. Plague Ship (2008)
4. Corsair (2009)
5. The Silent Sea (2010)
6. The Jungle (2011)
7. Mirage (2013)

=== Isaac Bell Adventures (with Clive Cussler) ===
1. The Titanic Secret (2019)
2. The Saboteurs (2021)
3. Clive Cussler: The Sea Wolves (2022)
4. Clive Cussler: The Heist (2024)
5. Clive Cussler: The Iron Storm (2025)
