= Andy McDermott =

British author

- Born: 2 July 1974 (age 52); Halifax, England
- Occupation: Novelist
- Writing career
- Period: 2007-present
- Genres: Action, thriller
- Website: www.andy-mcdermott.com

Andy McDermott (born 2 July 1974) is a British thriller author and former magazine editor, film critic, and journalist. He is best known for his Nina Wilde and Eddie Chase novels.

== History ==
Andy McDermott was born in Halifax, England on 2 July 1974. He graduated from Keele University in Staffordshire and currently lives in Bournemouth, where he works as a full-time writer. Before becoming an author he was a journalist and editor of magazines such as Hotdog Magazine and DVD Review; he has also worked as a cartoonist, graphic designer, and videogame reviewer, and has written for the award-winning British sci-fi comic 2000AD.

Netflix has bought the rights to the Nina Wilde and Eddie Chase franchise. Matt Reeves will be producing a cinematic adaptation of the first book The Hunt for Atlantis. No news since then.

== Books ==
=== Nina Wilde/Eddie Chase ===
- 2007 The Hunt for Atlantis (ISBN 978-0-7553-3911-2)
- 2008 The Tomb of Hercules (ISBN 978-0-7553-3914-3)
- 2008 The Secret of Excalibur (ISBN 978-0-7553-4550-2)
- 2009 The Covenant of Genesis (ISBN 978-0-7553-4553-3)
- 2009 The Cult of Osiris (US/Canada title: The Pyramid of Doom) (ISBN 978-0-7553-7745-9)
- 2010 The Sacred Vault (India Title: The Vault of Shiva) (ISBN 978-0-7553-7783-1)
- 2011 Empire of Gold (ISBN 978-0-7553-5467-2)
- 2012 Temple of the Gods (US/Canada title: Return to Atlantis) (ISBN 978-0-7553-5471-9)
- 2013 The Valhalla Prophecy (ISBN 978-0-7553-8064-0)
- 2014 Kingdom of Darkness (ISBN 978-0-7553-8072-5)
- 2015 The Last Survivor (Short Story)
- 2015 The Revelation Code (ISBN 978-1-1019-6529-0)
- 2016 The Midas Legacy (ISBN 978-0-7553-8081-7)
- 2017 King Solomon's Curse (ISBN 978-1-4722-3686-9)
- 2018 The Spear of Atlantis (ISBN 978-1-4722-3689-0)
- 2019 The Resurrection Key (ISBN 978-1-4722-3692-0)
- 2022 The Temple of Skulls (ISBN 978-1-4722-8497-6)
- 2023 The Knights of Atlantis (ISBN 978-1-0354-0083-6)
- 2025 The Shroud of Hades (scheduled for July 2025)
- 2026 The Pandora Conspiracy (scheduled 2026)

=== Alex Reeve ===
- 2020 Operative 66 (ISBN 978-1-472-26377-3)
- 2021 Rogue Asset (ISBN 978-1-472-26383-4)
- 2023 Ghost Target (ISBN 978-1-472-28502-7)
- 2024 Final Traitor (ISBN 978-1-035400881)

=== Others ===
- 2006 Final Destination: Death of the Senses (ISBN 1-84416-385-7)
- 2013 The Persona Protocol (ISBN 978-0-755-38068-8), published in the US & Canada as The Shadow Protocol

== Reception ==
Critical reception for McDermott's work has been mixed to positive. Publishers Weekly praised Hunt for Atlantis and The Covenant of Genesis.
