= Vulcan's Forge (novel) =

1998 novel by Jack Du Brul

- First edition
- Author: Jack Du Brul
- Language: English
- Series: Philip Mercer novels
- Genre: Adventure, Techno-thriller novel
- Publisher: Forge Books
- Publication date: 1998
- Publication place: United States
- Media type: Print
- Pages: 348
- ISBN: 978-0-312-86481-1
- OCLC: 62754601
- Followed by: Charon's Landing

Vulcan's Forge is a 1998 techno-thriller novel by Jack Du Brul. It is the first novel in the Philip Mercer series.

== Plot ==
In 1954, Soviet scientist Pytor Borodin devised a secret operation, code-named Vulcan's Forge, involving the detonation of a nuclear device deep beneath the Pacific Ocean. The operation was intended to produce a rare metal known as bikinium by detonating the device near an underwater vanadium deposit. The explosion also triggered volcanic activity at a natural underwater hotspot, setting in motion the formation of a new volcanic island. To conceal the operation, the ship carrying the device was sunk and its crew killed.

In the present day, the National Oceanic and Atmospheric Administration (NOAA) research vessel "Ocean Seeker" is destroyed while investigating an unexplained geological phenomenon north of Hawaii. Marine biologist Tish Talbot, the only survivor, is taken to a hospital in Washington, D.C., where she is placed under guard after an attempt on her life. Philip Mercer, a geologist and mining consultant who is a friend of Tish's father, intervenes to protect her. His investigation links the sinking to a pattern of missing survey ships and a shipping company used by the Russian operation. Mercer discovers that former KGB officer Ivan Kerikov is trying to take control of the emerging island and sell access to its mineral resources to a Korean consortium.

The operation also involves a contigency plan devised in case the volcano emerged within the United States' 200-mile maritime limit around Hawaii. Soviet agents had spent years cultivating the industrialist Takahiro Ohnishi, who seeks to make Hawaii independent from the United States. With support from local political figures, Ohnishi promotes a secessionist movement that develops into widespread violence. However, measurements confirm that the volcano's summit will emerge beyond the 200-mile limit, making the secession plan unnecessary to the original operation. Ohnishi's aide Kenji, meanwhile, has been working with the Korean consortium and manipulating both Ohnishi and Kerikov.

In Hawaii, Mercer joins a United States Navy SEAL team in an assault on Kenji's estate, where Kenji is killed and journalist Jill Tzu, who has been held captive, is rescued. Mercer then learns that a disguised Russian submarine, the "John Dory", is preparing to launch a nuclear missile at the volcano. He locates the vessel, boards it, and plants explosives on its hull. Aboard the submarine, he finds Valery Borodin, Pytor's son, and helps him escape before the explosives destroy the vessel. The threat to the volcano is averted, and the United States Navy establishes control of the site. Ohnishi and Kenji are dead, while Kerikov escapes and goes into hiding. The Korean consortium's attempt to claim the mineral deposit is also thwarted. Tish and Valery later reunite and join the team studying the newly emerged island.

After the crisis, Mercer discovers that the telegram that first drew him into the investigation was sent by his friend Harry White. White reveals that he is actually Ralph Line, the captain of the "Grandam Phoenix", the ship sunk during the original operation. Line survived the killing of his crew and had enlisted Mercer's help, without telling him the truth, in order to avenge their deaths.

== Characters ==
- Philip Mercer – The protagonist, a geologist and independent mining consultant whose expertise draws him into the investigation surrounding the emerging volcanic island.
- Tish Talbot – A marine biologist aboard the NOAA research vessel "Ocean Seeker" and the daughter of Mercer's friend Jack Talbot. She survives the destruction of the vessel and becomes central to Mercer's investigation.
- Ivan Kerikov – A senior Russian intelligence official who oversees the Vulcan's Forge project. Following the dissolution of the Soviet Union, he seeks to take control of the project's resources for his own benefit.
- Pytor Borodin – A Soviet scientist and geologist who devised the original Vulcan's Forge operation.
- Valery Borodin – Pytor Borodin's son and a geologist recruited to assist with the project. He develops a relationship with Tish Talbot.
- Takahiro Ohnishi – A wealthy Japanese industrialist living in Hawaii who supports a secessionist movement as part of a contingency plan connected to Vulcan's Forge.
- Kenji – Ohnishi's personal aide, who becomes involved in the competing schemes of Ohnishi, Kerikov and the Korean consortium.
- Jill Tzu – A television reporter in Hawaii who investigates Ohnishi's political activities and becomes involved in the unfolding conflict.
- Harry White (Ralph Michael Line) – Mercer's elderly friend, who is eventually revealed to be Ralph Line, the former captain of the "Grandam Phoenix", the ship destroyed during the original operation in 1954.

== Reception ==
Publishers Weekly described Vulcan's Forge as Du Brul's thriller debut in its review published on March 2, 1998. The review highlighted the novel's technological, political and ecological research, as well as Du Brul's storytelling, which it considered promising for future novels.
