= The Forge of Vulcan (Vasari) =

Painting by Giorgio Vasari

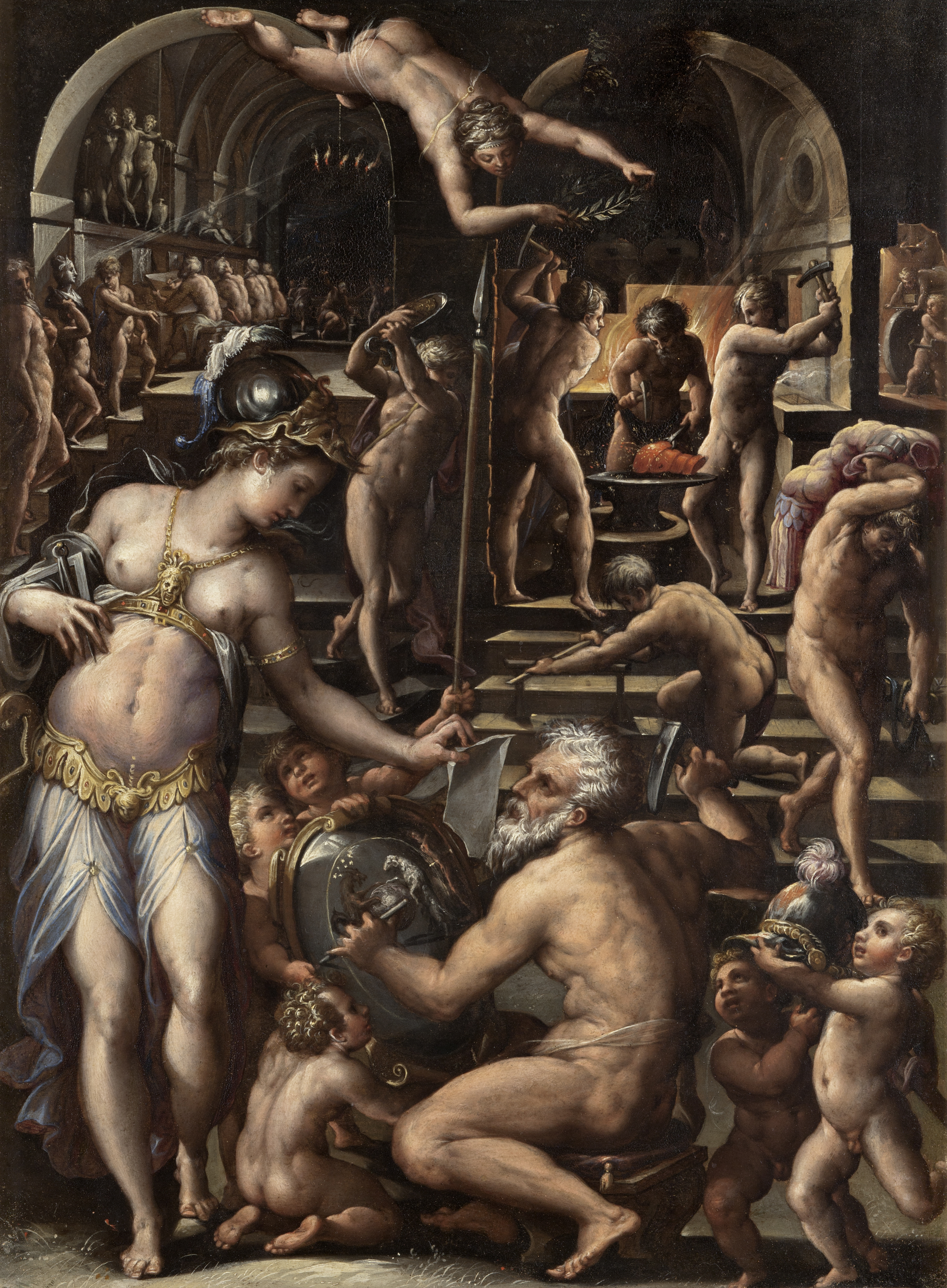
The Forge of Vulcan (c. 1564) by Giorgio Vasari

The Forge of Vulcan or Vulcan's Forge is an oil-on-copper painting by the Italian artist Giorgio Vasari, executed c. 1564, now in the Uffizi in Florence. A copy painted c. 1565–1567 by Pier Candido is now in Windsor Castle as part of the Royal Collection.

Influenced by the Medici court under Cosimo I and Francesco I, its themes and composition are similar to panels from the studiolo of the Palazzo Vecchio. Like them it derives from a letter to Vasari by Vincenzo Borghini, in which the writer recommended he paint not just a forge but also "an Academy of certain virtues" led by Minerva. This was a cultured reference to the Accademia delle Arti del Disegno that Vasari had founded in 1563 under the protection of Cosimo I. From 1589 onwards and possibly earlier it was displayed in the Tribuna of the Uffizi.

== Description and style ==
The technique and the small format combine to create an exquisitely crafted work, rich in characters and details. The mythological theme, enriched by messages and metaphors, was fully understandable only in the cultured court environment.

The underground forge of the god Vulcan (here a personification of ingenuity), represented as a swarm of naked workers in motion, is the backdrop to a meeting between the goddess Minerva, who has come to bring a drawing to be reproduced, and the god Vulcan himself, intent on chiseling a precious shield held up by playful cherubs.

The half-naked goddess, recognizable by her warlike helmet, holds a compass and protractor. The shield represents the sign of Capricorn, ascendant and protector of Duke Cosimo, and of Aries, zodiac sign of Francesco I, next to a globe. Two other putti are holding a helmet, an example of the god's magnificent art skills. Above a victory is gliding to bear the laurel wreath.

Among the activities represented are grinding, the furnace where metals are melted, the beating of a red-hot armor on the anvil, the transport of heavy busts and amphorae filled with metal.

On the left, a group of four naked artists, watched over by a statue of the Three Graces (modelled on the example of the Sienese ones in the Libreria Piccolomini) receives illumination from the flames of the chandelier to arrive at the supreme act of creation, which made art a noble and intellectual practice, as theorized by Vasari himself in his treatises.

The nudes with contorted poses are typical of Mannerism. Vasari's particular backlighting and emphasis on richness of details have parallels in the works of Stradano and Jacopo Zucchi.
