= Bob Cavin =

American audio engineer (born 1940)

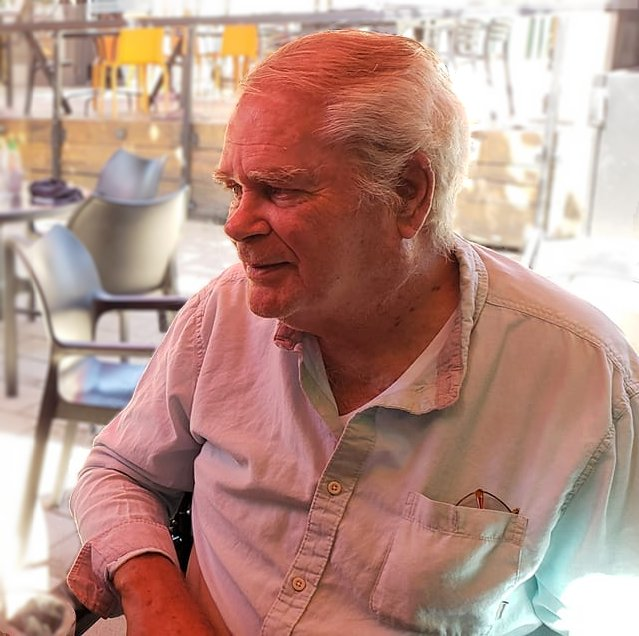
- Cavin in 2019
- Born: Robert Vernon Cavin; November 12, 1940 (age 85); San Francisco, California, U.S.
- Occupation: Audio electronics engineer
- Employers: U.S. Navy; McCune Sound; Apogee Sound; Furman Sound

Robert Vernon Cavin (born November 12, 1940) is an American audio engineer who built the first monitor mixing console, the first multi-angle monitor loudspeaker, and the first integrated processing/amplifier package for a 3-way loudspeaker. He was chief engineer of McCune Sound in San Francisco in the 1970s, and also vice president in the 1980s. In 1992 he accepted the chief engineer position at Apogee Sound where he designed the DA Series Class-H digitally controlled amplifier, winning the 1994 TCI Product of the Year Award. In 2000 he joined Furman Sound, and designed an interface system for Smaart users, and a new power conditioning system. Cavin's electronic designs were nominated five times for TEC Awards, in 1994, 1995, 1997, 1999 and 2001.

== Nuclear power ==
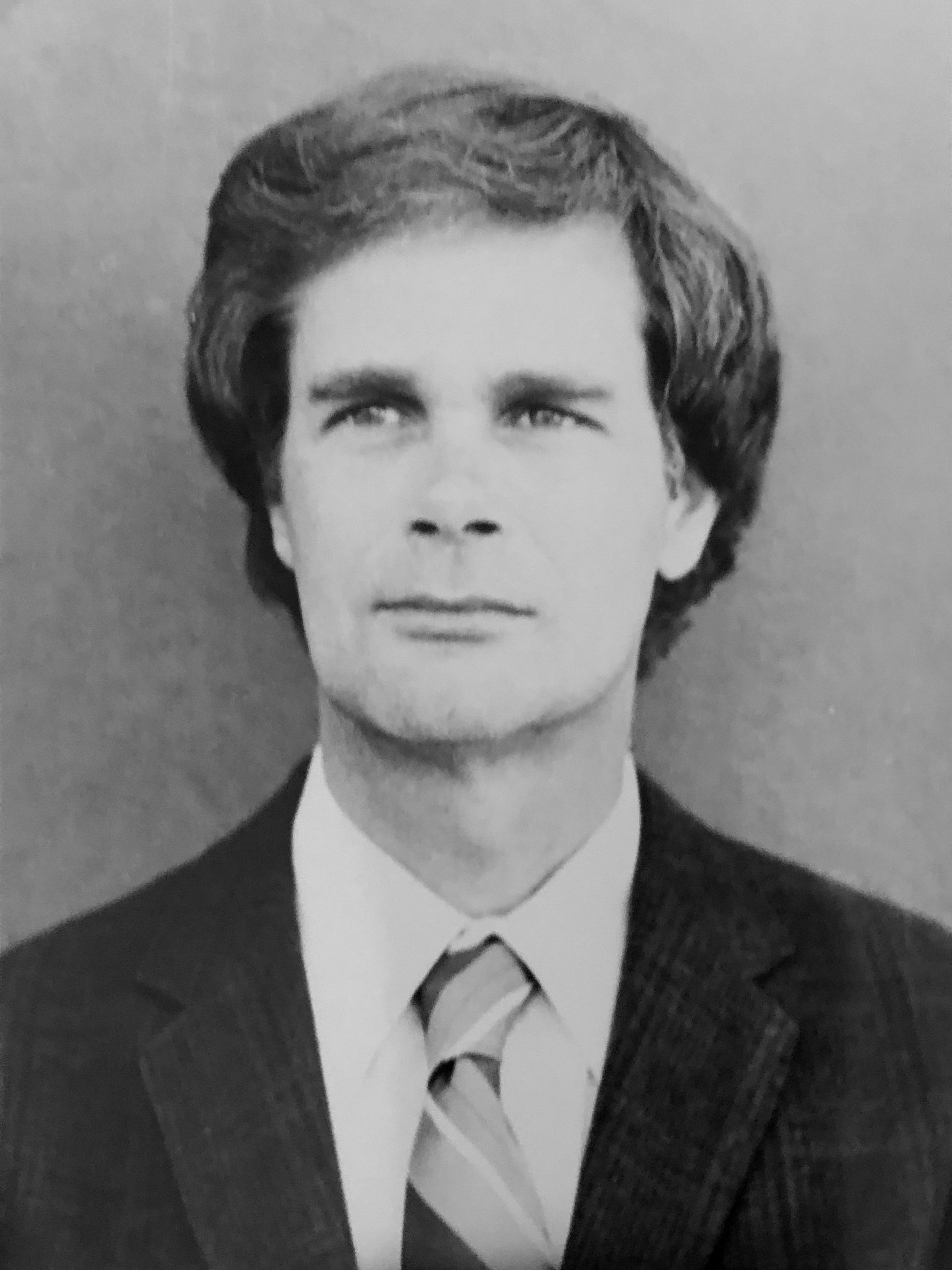
Cavin in the 1970s

Cavin joined the U.S. Navy in 1958, submitting a perfect score on the armed forces qualification test. Along with a few other high-scoring recruits, he was placed in the United States Atomic Energy Commission's Advanced Nuclear Power program, through which he studied electronics, metallurgy, calculus and physics. At Mare Island Naval Shipyard, he helped commission and launch the nuclear-powered USS Plunger, at the time the largest and most advanced attack submarine. His rank was Electronics Technician Second Class on the Plunger, where he served as a plankowner, among the first 11 crew members.

== McCune Sound ==
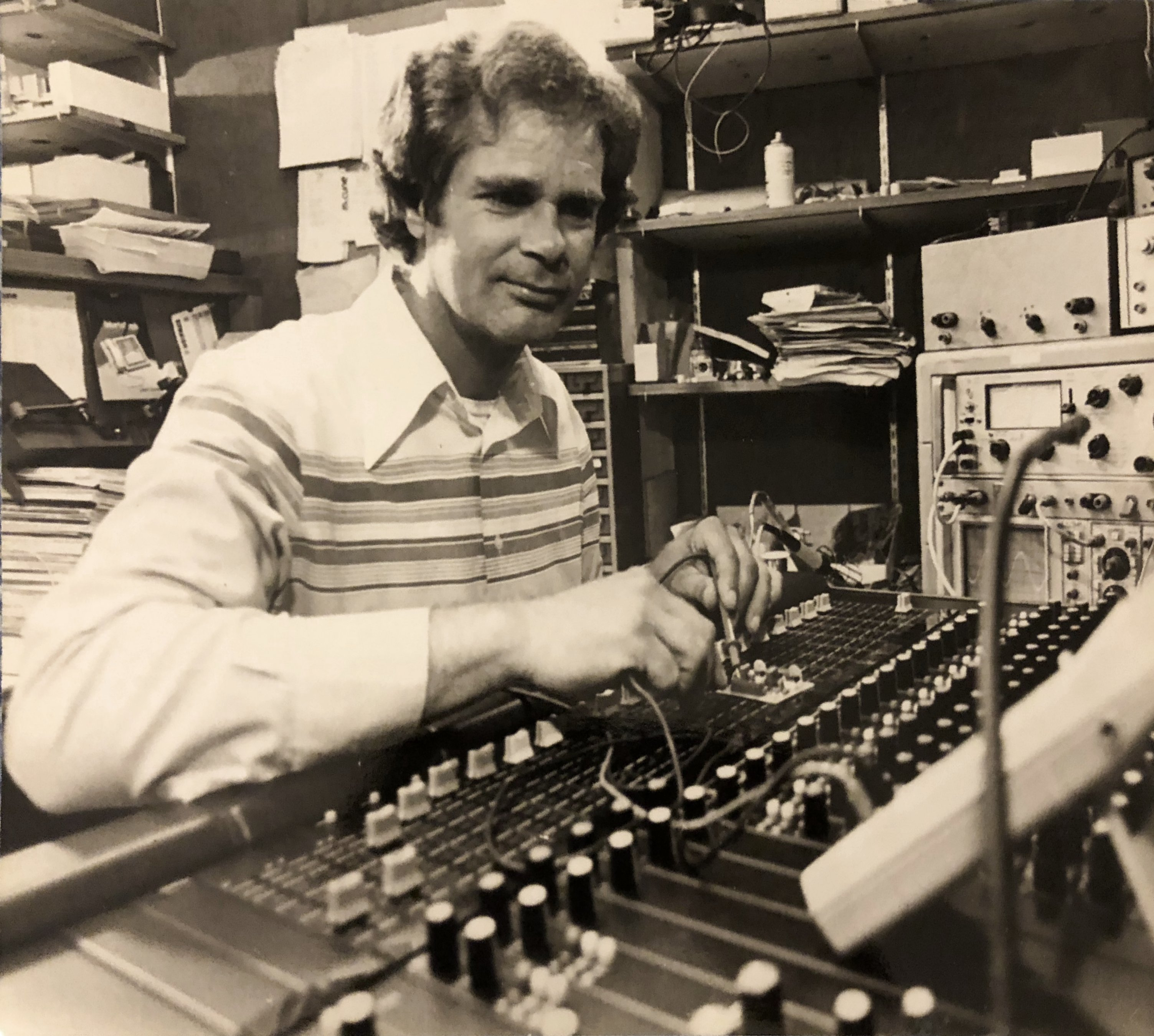
Cavin in the engineering department of McCune Sound

In 1964 Cavin started working as chief engineer for McCune Sound in San Francisco; a regional sound company founded in 1932 by Harry McCune. Cavin supervised the design, production and testing of the company's audio products, and he designed a 16-channel stereo mixing console used at Monterey Pop Festival in 1967. At the request of Harry McCune, Jr., audio engineer John Meyer was hired by McCune to produce the 3-way JM-3 concert loudspeaker. Cavin implemented a unity-sum crossover circuit that did not require flipping the polarity of adjacent passband drivers as was common at the time, and he modified the Crown DC-Series amplifiers to allow low-impedance loads of multiple drivers in parallel. The powerful JM-3 system was revolutionary, proving itself on many rock and pop concerts, starting with Joan Baez and then the Four for McGovern concert with Barbra Streisand in April 1972. Sound designer Abe Jacob specified the JM-3 throughout the 1970s for his Broadway shows, especially Jesus Christ Superstar and Beatlemania. Also for Beatlemania, Cavin modified the Electro-Voice 1776 vocal microphones to have less distortion by rebiasing the internal FET and changing the output capacitor. The JM-3 was the first full-range integrated electronically controlled loudspeaker system used for live sound, a category that expanded greatly in the next ten years.

Cavin led the McCune engineering team in creating the MM-4, the first mixing console intended solely for stage monitors. Another project was the MC-8 mixer for front-of-house, with 22 inputs, 2 effects sends and returns, 8 subgroups and 4 main outputs, built by McCune engineer Istvan B. "Steve" Kadar. The MC8 was unusual for having a matrix mixer section, and for its very low noise floor of −130.5 dBv, as referenced to the ideal single-resistor noise floor of −131 dBv at 0.775 volts. Both of these mixers were used on Beatlemania in 1979.

In 1976, Cavin headed the design of the McCune SM-3 2-way loudspeaker, again using a zero-sum crossover, and incorporating a compression driver design patented by Meyer, its phenolic diaphragm modified to yield higher compliance. Meyer assisted in time-aligning the two passbands, with Cavin determining that the SM-3 sounded more pleasing when the high frequencies were slightly ahead of the lows, a conclusion reached independently by Don Pearson, sound engineer for the Grateful Dead. In 1977, Cavin supervised the development of the McCune SM-4 2-way coaxial loudspeaker, based on the classic Altec 604E but with a low frequency driver extensively reworked by Kadar to deliver higher power, and also fitted with Meyer's more compliant high frequency compression driver. Cavin designed an active all-pass network to time-align the passbands, slightly delaying the low frequencies to match the highs. Cavin's proprietary improvement to the Altec 604 compared favorably with the same concept implemented via passive components by Ed Long for the contemporary UREI 813 studio monitor: his trademarked Time-Align process.

Meyer was contracted by McCune to design the JM-10 concert loudspeaker, a large single-point-source system intended to replace ten JM-3s. Cavin chose a bucket-brigade delay to align the high frequency drivers about 1.5 milliseconds back from the mids and lows. Digital delay devices were tried but they had too much distortion, while the chosen bucket-brigade solution was somewhat hissy. Cavin designed a noise gate for the JM-10 processing to stop the high frequency hiss when no signal was present. The JM-10 system was used on the Kool Jazz Festival touring the U.S. in mid-1977. Cavin accompanied the tour to provide technical support.

In the late 1970s, Cavin designed a 50-pair snake splitter for large events, used to send each microphone signal to multiple mixers such as for front-of-house mix (FOH), monitor mix and a recording truck. The splitter used Jensen transformers and two latching 27-pair snake connectors for each mixer. The splitter system was used on many events, for instance the Playboy Jazz Festival at the Hollywood Bowl, which needed duplicate 27-pair stage boxes on both sides of a rotating stage. It was also used on the Monterey Jazz Festival to feed FOH and two trucks. Cavin put a one-amp fuse across the electrical ground to make certain that musicians would be protected from electrocution in case of electrical fault.

Cavin toured and provided technical support for Burt Bacharach in the 1970s, including dates in South America 1978, with Harry McCune Jr mixing and Terry Simmons on the crew. Cavin also flew to Bacharach shows in the Philippines in 1981, and other dates in Reno, Las Vegas, and more. For overseas concerts the JM-3 loudspeaker system was flown as cargo in a commercial jet.

In July 1982, McCune promoted Cavin to the newly created position of Vice President of Engineering and Computers. Cavin was put in charge of the company's new computer rental division.

== Apogee Sound ==
After 1979 when Meyer started his own company, Meyer Sound Laboratories, McCune bought a number of the flagship Meyer UPA 2-way loudspeakers for their rental stock, and also recommended them to clients such as the Crystal Cathedral who wanted to purchase loudspeakers rather than rent them. McCune engineer Ken DeLoria grew frustrated working with Meyer and he decided to re-engineer the UPA to create the McCune SM-5. Serving as company vice president since 1982 and continuing as chief engineer, Cavin designed an appropriate integrated processor/amplifier package with sense lines to detect distortion, and McCune carpenter Dan Ritzo built a multi-angle version for stage monitor purposes, taking inspiration from Cavin's SM-4. McCune's version of the UPA was the SM-5 while the monitor wedge was the SM-6. Upon the success of the SM-5/SM-6 project, DeLoria asked Harry McCune, Jr., to begin selling loudspeakers in addition to renting them. The request was denied, as McCune preferred to stay a rental house rather than become a manufacturer. To fill perceived market demand DeLoria started his own company in 1985, Apogee Sound in Petaluma, California, first producing the AE-5 and AE-6, DeLoria's version of the SM-5 and SM-6. Cavin remained working for McCune until 1992 when he signed on as chief engineer with Apogee Sound.

At Apogee Sound, Cavin designed or improved many products, including the following:

- SBS Controller, a networked processor that monitored multiple amplifiers and switched a failing amplifier for a spare.
- Safety-Net, a networked loudspeaker monitor as part of a fire safety system.
- MA-Series amplifier, a Class-D amplifier containing eight channels of 250 watts each, all networked.
- DA-Series amplifier, a Class-H amplifier with networking, nominated for a TEC Award and winning the TCI Product of the Year.
- ACS System, a modular system of processing cards including crossover, equalizer and limiter.
- CRQ-12, a temperature-stable 12-filter parametric equalizer that could also be operated as two 6-filter units.
- CORREQT, a method for routing multiple test microphone signals to a fast Fourier transform (FFT) room analysis system.
- 2001 driver, a high power, low distortion compression driver diaphragm made of neodymium.

== Furman Sound ==
Cavin joined Furman Sound in 2000 as director of engineering under new company president Gary Kephart, who had been the previous chief engineer. In collaboration with Don Pearson of Ultra Sound/Pro Media, Cavin designed the AIS-10, a very low noise audio interface enabling Smaart users to route microphone and line level signals for testing sound systems. Cavin also developed a four-stage power conditioning system trademarked as SMP+ which was integrated into Furman's popular line of rackmountable power conditioners.

== Personal life ==
Cavin married Carolyn Ann Jones on December 28, 1964, at Transfiguration Episcopal Church in San Mateo. They lived in San Francisco, Tamalpais Valley, and Novato. They had three children: Christina (1967), Neil (1969) and Cathleen (1972). The couple divorced in 1979. Cavin moved to San Rafael where he married Patricia St. John in October 1986, in a ceremony involving the San Rafael Yacht Club, with a floating procession to the wedding reception. He was a fleet captain of the San Rafael Yacht Club, and raced his Catalina 27 named Trifle. He lived in Novato for many years, then moved to Sonoma.

Cavin liked to go fishing; in 1967 he caught a 150-pound (68 kg) sturgeon in the San Francisco Bay off the north side of Tiburon Peninsula, after an hour-long struggle using 18-pound test line intended for striped bass.
