= Coaxial loudspeaker =

Loudspeaker system in which the individual drivers share the same point or axis

A coaxial loudspeaker is a loudspeaker system in which the individual driver units radiate sound from the same point or axis. Two general types exist: one is a compact design using two or three speaker drivers, usually in car audio, and the other is a two-way high-power design for professional audio, also known as single-source or dual-concentric loudspeakers. The design is favored for its compactness and behavior as an audio point source.

== Professional audio ==
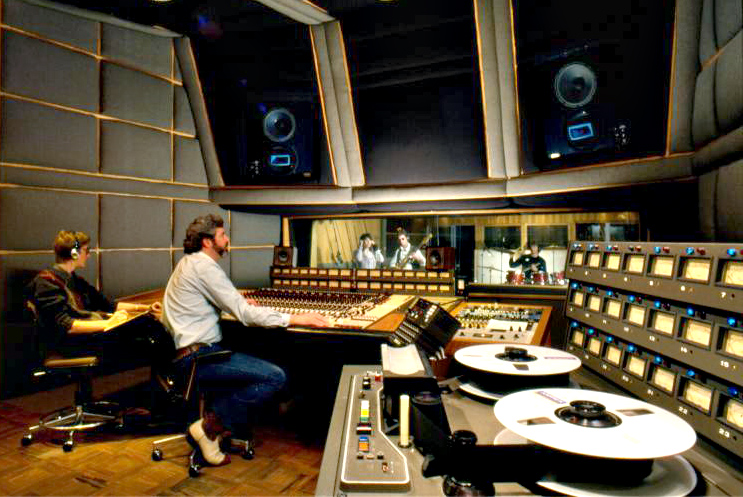
The studio monitors over the window are a pair of UREI 813s, each of which has a horn driver for high frequencies (blue rectangle) and coaxial 15-inch (38 cm) coaxial driver surrounding it and a plain 15-inch driver above.

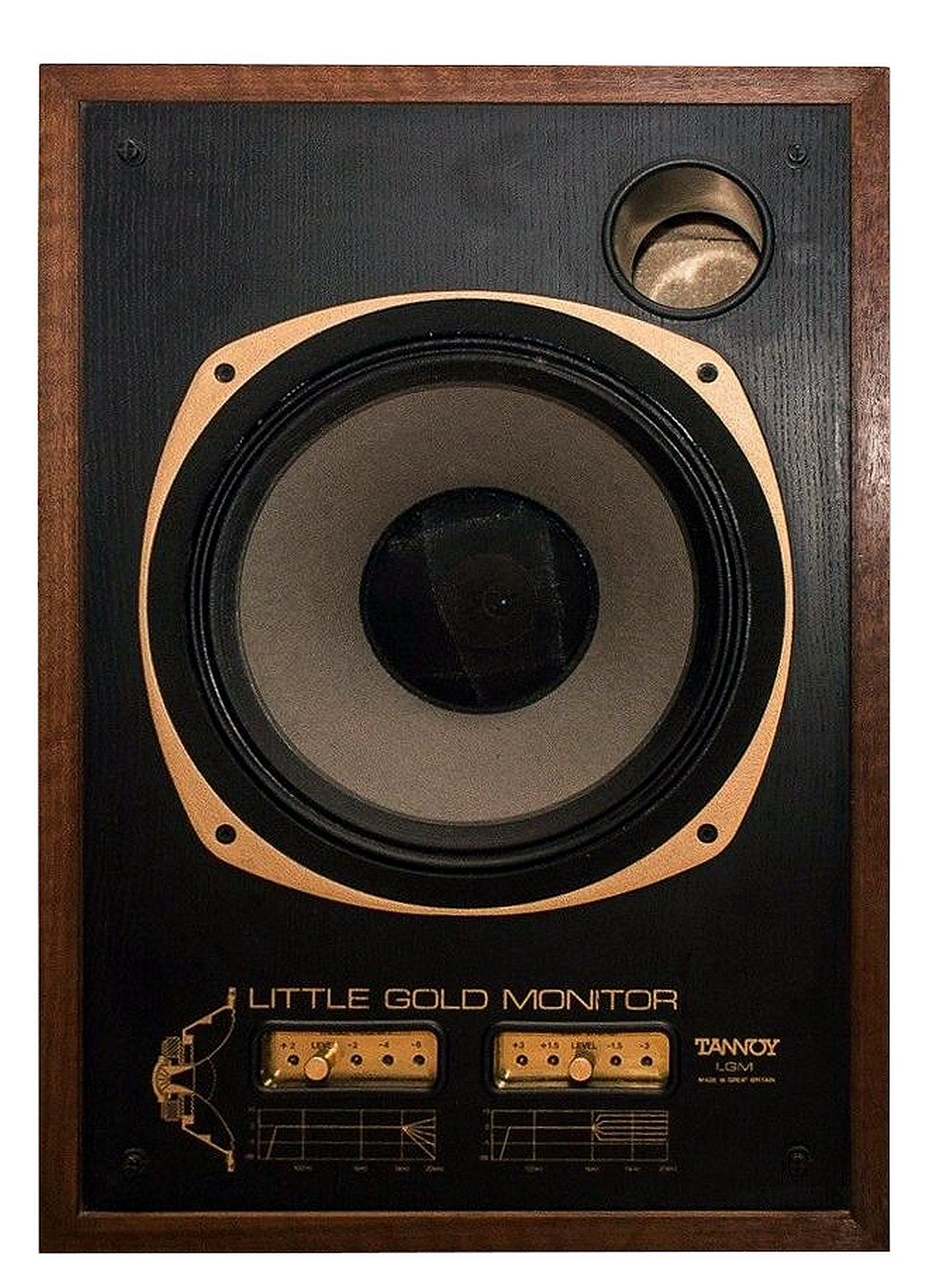
Studio monitor loudspeaker from Tannoy (c. 1990) with a 12-inch (30 cm) bass driver having a second, independent 2-inch (5.1 cm) driver for high frequencies in the center. The crossover frequency is 1400 Hz.

Coaxial loudspeakers in professional audio enable sound from two drivers to come from one source. This characteristic allows a wider field of listening to a synchronized summation of speaker drivers than loudspeaker enclosures containing physically separated drivers. As well, the pattern of response is symmetric around the axis of the loudspeaker.

Since the 1943 introduction of the Altec Lansing Duplex 601 coaxial driver, recording studio monitors have often been coaxial loudspeaker designs. In 1945 the improved Altec 604 was introduced, and it soon became the recording industry standard studio monitor in the U.S. First shown in 1947 in England, the Tannoy Dual Concentric design assumed the same role across Europe from the 1950s onward. The Altec 604 combined a 15-inch (380 mm) woofer with a compression driver attached to a horn to carry the high frequencies. The Tannoy also used a 15-inch woofer and a compression driver for high frequencies, but differed in that the woofer itself served as the final horn flare for the high frequency driver. Thus, its output pattern was radially symmetric, not just mirror-image symmetric as in the Altec. Both designs placed the high frequency driver behind the low frequency driver, and both were not initially time aligned. The high frequencies arrived at the listener's ear slightly later than the low frequencies.

One drawback of the design is the production line difficulty in mating the two drivers, and in replacing or reconing the woofer. Another drawback is that the low frequencies tend to modulate the high frequencies, causing greater intermodulation distortion. The Tannoy style of coaxial, with the woofer forming part of the high frequency horn, had greater intermodulation distortion. Designs similar to the Altec 604 have further problems with diffraction of the low frequencies around the central horn, and with rearward emanations from the horn body reflected forward by the woofer out of time with direct sound. All of the problems with sound waves tend to increase with sound pressure level, causing significant shifts in tone as the loudspeaker changes volume.

In the late 1970s, Bill Putnam of Universal Audio worked with Ed Long and his patented Time Alignment crossover design to fix the long-standing problem of the two bandpasses not being aligned in time at their crossover point. The Altec 604 was given this elaborate new crossover feature and incorporated into the UREI 813 studio monitor, which also had a second woofer physically separate from the coaxial pair. This design dominated recording studios of the 1980s, and time alignment became a feature of competing manufacturers. In 1977, Bob Cavin of McCune Sound in San Francisco modified the Altec 604 for the McCune SM-4, a large proprietary stage wedge, using John Meyer's patented high-compliance compression driver diaphragm, a higher-power woofer, and processor-controlled bi-amplification with line-level all-pass time alignment. The McCune SM-4 was the first multi-angle stage monitor, and was used by many McCune clients such as the Playboy Jazz Festival and the Monterey Jazz Festival. In the 2000s, digital signal processing (DSP) was used by Fulcrum Acoustic to reduce some of the coaxial drawbacks, such as the diffraction of the woofer's upper range around the central horn, by filling in this shadow with low-frequency sound from the compression driver, and by countering the out-of-time reflections bouncing off the woofer.

Coaxial loudspeakers have been used in stage monitors, giving musicians a more even sound field because of the single-source characteristic. As well, the enclosure may be made more compact. In the 1980s, Professional Audio Systems (PAS), using Time Alignment technology from Ed Long, sold the popular SW series of compact stage wedges, offered with a 12- or 15-inch woofer, and having a projecting high-frequency horn as in the 604. Other stage monitors using coaxial designs are made by Clair Brothers, L-Acoustics, Radian Audio Engineering, RCF, Beyma, dB Technologies, Fulcrum Acoustic, and Rat Sound in partnership with Eastern Acoustic Works.

David Gunness and Fulcrum Acoustic have designed coaxial loudspeakers beginning in 2009, notably collaborating with PreSonus in 2013 to create the self-powered line of Sceptre S6 and S8 coaxial studio monitors, and releasing Fulcrum's own FH15 full-range horn-loaded loudspeaker series in 2018. All of the coaxial Fulcrum designs use digital signal processing to reduce distortion modes. Fulcrum's proprietary process is called Temporal Equalization (TQ).

In 2015, Fluid Audio launched the FX8 studio monitor, featuring a coaxial design with the tweeter mounted directly in front of the woofer on a fixed post. The tweeter is housed in a plastic waveguide reducing intermodulation distortion.

== Home audio ==
Tannoy has produced coaxial loudspeakers for the hi-fidelity home consumer market since the early 1950s. Their "Dual Concentric" drivers early series included, in order of introduction: Tannoy Blacks, Tannoy Silvers, Tannoy Reds, and Tannoy Golds. Jensen introduced several coaxial speakers in the 1950s, including their highly regarded triaxial models. Several other manufacturers introduced coaxial speakers and drivers in the 1950s, including University. However, due to their higher cost, most did not last in the consumer market.

In 1988, KEF introduced an extension of the coaxial loudspeaker concept. Their Uni-Q driver is a coincident driver, where the two drivers share the same acoustic center and therefore are closer in time alignment. This was made possible by using the then newly affordable, powerful yet small neodymium magnets for the tweeter, making the whole tweeter assembly small enough, magnet included, to fit inside the woofer's voice coil. Other home audio speaker companies making coaxial speakers include TAD, Cabasse with their 4-way Concentric QC-55 Driver as seen in their flagship model - La Sphère, Hsu, Vandersteen, until recently Theil, and a budget speaker made a few years ago by Insignia.

== Car audio ==
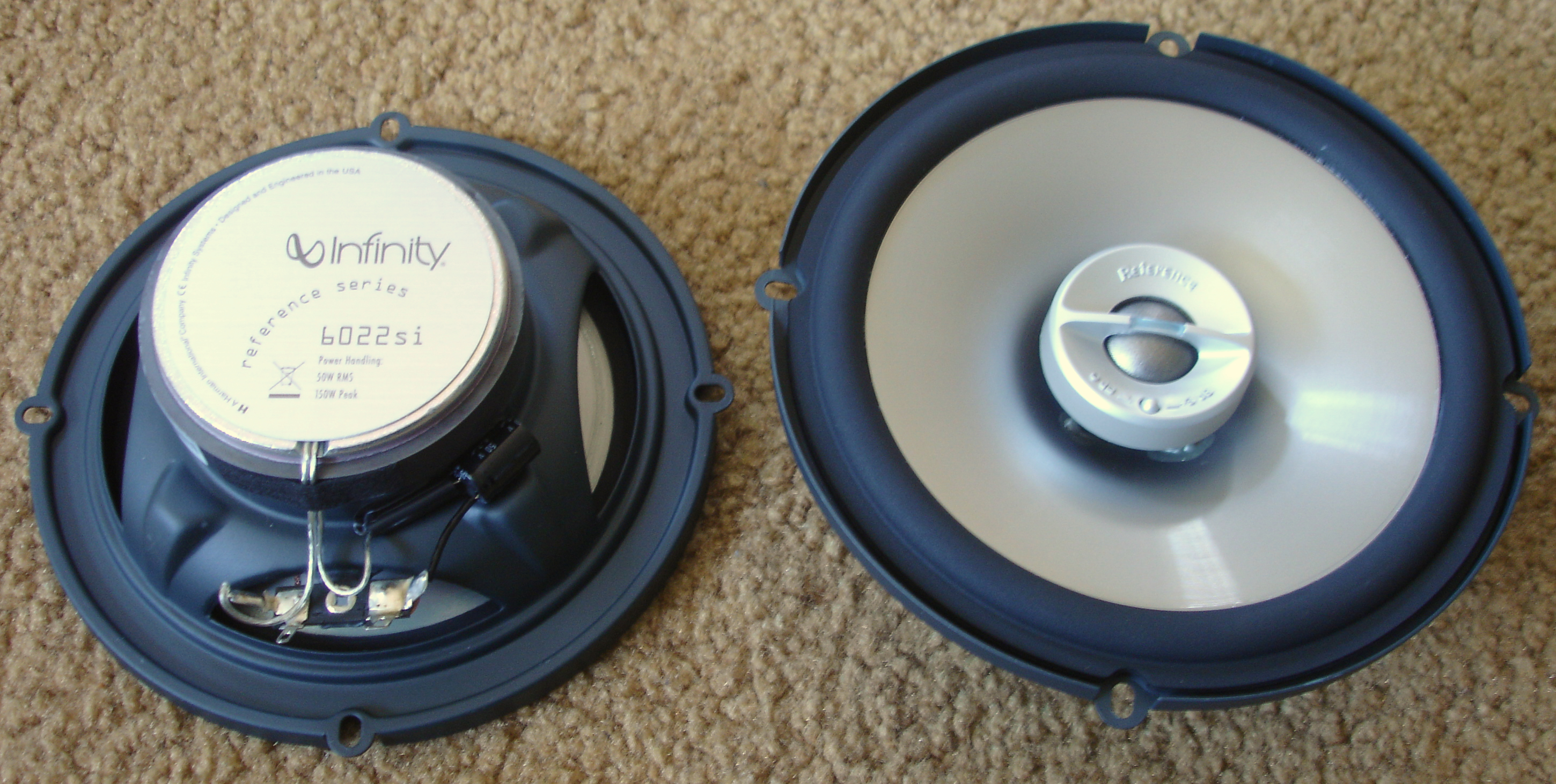
A car audio speaker with a coaxial tweeter in front of the woofer

Coaxial speakers in automobiles are 2- or 3-way loudspeakers in which the tweeter, or the tweeter and a mid-range driver, are mounted in front of the woofer, partially obscuring it. The advantage of this design is the ability to use a smaller area, hence its popularity in car audio. The low-frequency sound waves from the woofer are not reduced too much by the drivers in their path. Without time-alignment correction, the sound from the tweeter may arrive slightly before the sound from the woofer; this misalignment is not generally addressed in automobile sound systems.

This design was popularized in the 1970s with Electronic Industries, Inc. of South Holland, Illinois introducing the general concept in May 1973, and Jensen Loudspeakers introducing a retail model the next month. This was followed by designs from Sparkomatic, Clarion, Infinity and others.
