= Abe Jacob =

American sound designer and audio engineer

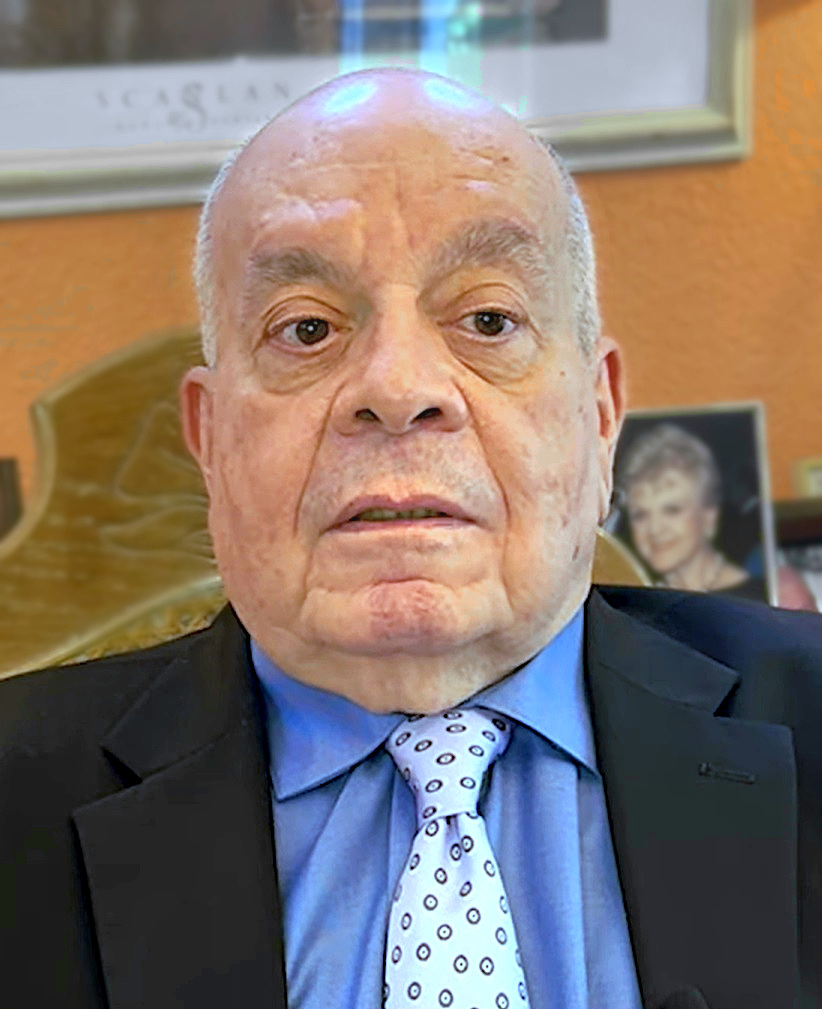
- Jacob receiving Special Tony Award 2024
- Born: Abe John Jacob; October 7, 1944 (age 82); Tucson, Arizona
- Education: Loyola Marymount University
- Occupations: Sound designer, live sound audio engineer
- Employer: McCune Sound
- Known for: Monterey Pop Festival; Hair; Jesus Christ Superstar; Pippin; The Rocky Horror Show; A Chorus Line; Dancin'; Evita; Beatlemania

Abe John Jacob (born October 7, 1944) is an American sound designer and audio engineer. Called the "Godfather of Sound", Jacob greatly influenced the design of sound reinforcement in modern musical theatre, and was one of the first persons credited in the role of sound designer on Broadway, with a sound designer credit in Playbill in 1971.

Jacob brought many new techniques to musical theatre, including head-worn wireless microphones, powerful concert loudspeakers with dedicated electronic processing, delayed speaker zones, under-balcony speakers, front-fill speakers, mix position in the audience, FFT analysis, scene recall, digital mixing consoles, and delay used to focus audience attention. Jacob sparked the creation of the Meyer Sound Laboratories UPA loudspeaker, which became their flagship product.

In 1998, Jacob won an Ovation Award for his sound design of Harriet's Return at the Geffen Playhouse. He never received a Tony Award, largely because the American Theatre Wing and The Broadway League began giving out Tony Awards for sound design in 2008 after his career highlights. He served on the Tony Award committee from 2011 to 2014, but then the committee halted the sound design category. Lighting designer Jules Fisher, Jacob's colleague on many productions, said that Jacob should have won a Tony Award in 1978 for Dancin'. Jacob received a Special Tony Award for "modern theatrical sound design" in June 2024 at the 77th Tony Awards at Lincoln Center.

In 1999, the United States Institute for Theatre Technology (USITT) bestowed upon Jacob the Distinguished Achievement in Sound Award. The same year, Jacob received the Lifetime Achievement Award at the EDDY Awards sponsored by Entertainment Design magazine. In 2008, the USITT gave Jacob their highest award, the USITT Award, and they commissioned the organization's first audio engineering monograph, titled The Designs of Abe Jacob. In 2016, Jacob was honored with a Lifetime Achievement Award at the Live Design Awards ceremony. In 2017, the Theatrical Sound Designers and Composers Association (TSDCA) granted Jacob the Distinguished Sound Designer Award.

== Early life ==
Abe John Jacob was born on October 7, 1944, in Tucson, Arizona. His parents were Abe Taft Jacob and Victoria Jacob (née Shaar), both of Lebanese heritage; his grandparents owned a supermarket in Tucson. After the supermarket closed because of wartime rationing, Jacob's father and his uncle George opened a Mexican restaurant in 1946, named Club 21, which operated for the next 73 years. When he was four years old, Jacob was crossing the street with his aunt, mother and maternal grandmother when a car struck two of them. His mother and grandmother were fatally injured. Abe and his aunt Mabel survived because she ran and pulled him out of the way. After this, he was raised by his aunt until he was 11.

At the urging of his aunt, Jacob acted very briefly in film, with a bit part in the 1951 Ronald Reagan western The Last Outpost at the age of six, and after that he performed as Tad Lincoln in a staging of Abe Lincoln in Illinois at the University of Arizona. Jacob appeared in several children's theatre performances in Tucson, but at age nine he was done with his acting career. Though he wished to be a musician, Jacob did not want to practice the piano, which made him realize he would never be a great pianist. In 1955, Jacob moved with his father and new stepmother to the Haddon Hill neighborhood of Oakland, California, where he attended Catholic school classes and served as an altar boy at Our Lady of Lourdes along with his new best friend, Tom Gericke. In September 1958, Jacob entered Catholic high school at St. Ignatius College Preparatory in San Francisco, while Gericke attended St. Joseph Notre Dame High School in Alameda. Despite this separation, Jacob and Gericke continued their friendship, with Jacob recording Gericke's teenage band around 1960.

Jacob joined the audio-visual department at his school. His first theatrical sound design role came when St. Ignatius was staging performances of High Button Shoes, The Mikado and The Desperate Hours. Without realizing it, Jacob put together a sound system design much like those being used at the time in Broadway plays – a system based on a few Altec 639 ribbon microphones positioned as foot mics along the front edge of the stage, amplified into Altec Voice of the Theatre loudspeakers. Because the school did not have the necessary equipment, Jacob rented a sound system for $150/week from McCune Sound, a regional sound company founded in 1932 by Harry McCune. This early connection to McCune was to prove critically important to Jacob's career.

== Early career ==
Graduating from high school, Jacob worked for McCune during the summer of 1962, then in September he moved to Los Angeles to enroll in college classes at Loyola Marymount University, where he earned a B.A. degree. At Loyola, he designed sound and lights for the college's theatrical productions, and he put together his own radio show on KXLU, the college's radio station; an early evening classical music program titled Eine Kleine Commute Music. Every summer he returned to the San Francisco Bay Area and worked for McCune. In 1964 and 1965, Jacob worked at the Berkeley Community Theatre on Ben Kapen's summer series theatrical program known as Melodyland. The 1965 year was different as Jacob worked the stage manager position for the first and last time, shepherding four productions: Leslie Uggams in The Boy Friend, Godfrey Cambridge in A Funny Thing Happened on the Way to the Forum, Pearl Bailey in Call Me Madam and Richard Chamberlain in Private Lives. Bailey was such a difficult client that Jacob determined never again to be stage manager.

Jacob was finished with his college coursework at the end of 1965, but his diploma ceremony was in June 1966. In the interim, Jacob worked at McCune. On August 29, 1966, he was part of the sound crew at the Beatles' final concert appearance, supported by McCune at Candlestick Park. Jacob joined Harry McCune's son, Harry McCune Jr., in developing the new concept of musicians touring with their own sound system. Jacob's old schoolmate Gericke was now a record producer working with people such as Lou Adler of Dunhill Records, and through this connection Jacob was introduced to Bobby Roberts, Dunhill's touring manager. Roberts asked Jacob to fix the problems which were being experienced on the road by the Mamas and the Papas, who were touring in support of their big radio hits "California Dreamin'" and "Monday, Monday". Jacob designed a sound system for them and mixed their show at the Boston Armory in October 1966. The group gave only about 30 concerts, and Jacob mixed most of them, including ones at Carnegie Hall and the Hollywood Bowl. The touring career of the Mamas and the Papas ended in early 1967.

== Monterey Pop ==
The Mamas and the Papas bandleader John Phillips assembled a board of directors to mount a free festival in Monterey, California. The board included Simon and Garfunkel, Cass Elliot, Lou Adler, John Lennon and Paul McCartney. Many major pop artists lobbied to perform, and the festival grew in scope, expanding to fill three days. The resulting Monterey Pop Festival was held during June 16–18, 1967.

Jacob designed the sound system for the whole festival, and he incorporated the stage requirements of the various bands on the bill, after which he determined that he would need a total of 24 microphone inputs on his mixer, which was unheard of at the time. He augmented the proprietary 16-channel stereo sound console designed by McCune head engineer Bob Cavin with two 4-channel mono Altec 1567 tube mixers to get 24 inputs. The mix position was at the side of the stage, a less-than-optimal but common configuration at the time because of cabling limitations. Meagher Electronics, known for supporting the Monterey Jazz Festival in the 1960s, supplied additional audio equipment and personnel including electronics technician Charlie Richmond, who observed that the rock festival pushed the sound gear much harder than the jazz festival. Both McCune and Meagher were Altec dealers, so Jacob combined their inventory to create a loudspeaker array appropriate for the Monterey County Fairgrounds main stage. Centered on the roof of the stage was a pair of Altec 612 cabinets topped with a pair of 203B horns. Four Altec 612 cabinets were in pairs at the left and right edges of the stage, surmounted on each side with a 1003B multicellular horn, an Altec A7 "Voice of the Theatre" cabinet, another 203B horn, and an Altec 9844 studio monitor for front fill. A pair of Altec 214 loudspeakers served the musicians as sidefill left and right, which in 1967 was an advancement in stage monitoring. All of this was powered by Altec amplifiers totaling about 1,000 watts. During soundcheck, guitarist/vocalist David Crosby of the Byrds exclaimed, "Oh groovy! A nice sound system at last," a moment which was caught on film and featured in the documentary Monterey Pop. McCune veteran Mort Feld mixed most of the acts while Jacob worked the stage. Jacob mixed two performances: Ravi Shankar's four hour set, and the Mamas and the Papas who closed the festival.

To get good sound for the film, recording engineer Wally Heider worked closely with Jacob to ensure a high quality signal from the same microphones used for the live sound system; this professional connection was called upon again in 1968 when Heider asked Jacob to assist in recording Cream at Winterland Ballroom. Similarly, other contacts made by Jacob at Monterey Pop served to advance his career. Lighting designer Chip Monck first met Jacob in Monterey, and later formed CMI Consultants in partnership with Jacob. Janis Joplin's road manager Albert Grossman was introduced to Jacob in Monterey, and he tapped Jacob in later years for touring support. A number of people involved with Jimi Hendrix were impressed with Jacob at Monterey, including managers Chas Chandler and Michael Jeffery, producer Jerry Goldstein and concert promoter Tom Hulett. Another connection Jacob made was with John Meyer, a young sound engineer who was supporting the Steve Miller Band. Meyer later said that Jacob and his McCune crew stood out because they were unusually dedicated to consistent audio quality.

The Monterey Pop experience transformed Jacob from a regional to a national figure in the field of concert sound.

== Hendrix and more ==
After Monterey, Hendrix's road manager, Gerry Stickels, called McCune to request Jacob as sound designer and mixer on tour. Jacob specified a sound system much like the one at Monterey, and first deployed it for Hendrix at the Ambassador Theater in Washington, D.C., during August 9–12, 1967, where he mixed the Jimi Hendrix Experience. After this, while Hendrix took a break to record Axis: Bold as Love, Jacob mixed sound for Simon and Garfunkel for three dates in Oregon in October 1967. The next month, Monck flew Jacob to New York City to meet Peter, Paul and Mary, who did not need a new sound system, as they owned one already, but needed someone with good ears to mix their shows. Jacob accepted the assignment and mixed their concerts from 1968 to 1970. In Manhattan, Jacob was supplied his own office space on 55th Street by Albert Grossman, who had seen Jacob's work at Monterey.

Jacob toured with the Jimi Hendrix Experience for most of 1968. The year started with a rush of travel through Sweden, Denmark and France in January, followed by a Hendrix concert in San Francisco at The Fillmore on February 1, 1968. San Francisco had been Jacob's new hometown since early June 1967 when he moved into an old Victorian flat with housemates Doug Leighton (future co-founder of RTS Systems intercom products), Ben Fong-Torres (editor at Rolling Stone) and his old friend Tom Gericke. Jacob's time in San Francisco was short as he soon left to mix sound for Hendrix in 49 cities across the U.S. The sound gear for this tour fit into a single 19-foot box truck along with some lighting gear, all the band's musical instruments, the band's concert posters, and assorted merchandise. To mix the show, Jacob used two Altec 1567A four-channel rotary knob mixers linked together, one for the four drum microphones (kick, snare, overhead left and overhead right), and one for the vocal microphones, which consisted of Hendrix on lead vocals, bassist Noel Redding on backing vocals, and one channel for Jacob to announce the band at the start of the show. No microphones were needed for lead guitar or bass guitar, which had their own amplifiers. The stage monitor system was simply two Altec 604E sidefills which took their signal from a custom McCune-designed combiner fed with inputs from the two Altec mixers' auxiliary outputs. This was not enough for drummer Mitch Mitchell to hear the vocals and his own drums, so in the second half of 1968, when Hendrix started another tour, Jacob augmented the sound system with four self-powered speakers behind the drummer: four Altec 1604B cabinets. This helped Mitchell hear himself over the loud guitar amplifiers.

During a break in which Hendrix stopped touring to record Electric Ladyland, Jacob mixed sound for some Peter, Paul and Mary dates, notably their March 15, 1968, performance at Carnegie Hall, and he worked for McCune on various assignments such as the Sky River Rock Festival in August–September in Washington state. He helped Heider record the Firesign Theatre comedy troupe, and in October he supported Cass Elliot in concert at Caesars Palace in Las Vegas.

Hendrix took Jacob to Europe in early 1969 to mix his concert dates there. Among other appearances that year by Hendrix was the Northern California Folk-Rock Festival in May 1969, where the sound system stopped working for a few minutes during his set. Carlos Santana commented about the technical glitch that Hendrix's guitar by itself made him sound distant, "like he was inside a little nucleus", but when the full sound system was restored "we were like catapulted into the Milky Way." The rest of 1969 was busy for Jacob mixing more than 160 dates for Peter, Paul and Mary. Bandleader Peter Yarrow was a stern taskmaster with regard to sound quality, and Jacob credits Yarrow with helping him develop more of a critical ear, to listen for problem areas and to work diligently to correct them.

Also in 1969, Jacob and Gericke tried to produce a psychedelic music video, with three bands participating including Blue Cheer and the Steve Miller Band, but the results were low quality and the project never took off.

Back at McCune, John Meyer had been hired at the request of Harry Jr to create a 3-way loudspeaker for concerts. By early 1972 the revolutionary JM3 system was ready, named for Meyer but with electronic processing by both Meyer and Cavin. Jacob auditioned the JM3 at the shop, with Meyer playing a Nagra tape of the Ringo Starr drum solo on the song "The End" to help Jacob determine that the new loudspeaker was clean and powerful, reproducing crisp transients. Jacob immediately agreed to use the system. Meyer said about Jacob, "There wasn't a lot of discussion... you didn't have to talk him into it." Jacob used JM3s at Four for McGovern, a benefit concert for presidential candidate George McGovern, on April 15, 1972, inside The Forum (Inglewood, California). Barbra Streisand's album Live Concert at the Forum documents her performance that day.

Jacob began in 1970 to wean himself from Hendrix tours, as he had more concert dates with Peter, Paul and Mary. McCune soundman Mike Neal took over sound for Hendrix, mixing a sold-out show at the Berkeley Community Theatre in May while Jacob recorded the event from inside the Wally Heider mobile recording truck. To satisfy the large, angry crowd turned away at the doors, Jacob pointed the truck's loudspeakers at them to appease them, perhaps preventing a riot. Neal yielded to Jacob on the more important dates such as the Isle of Wight Festival in August 1970, and a series of shows in Sweden, Denmark and Germany. Jacob was working another show on September 18 when he learned that Hendrix had died. Jacob traveled to Seattle to attend Hendrix's private funeral on October 1, with only family and musical associates invited. Shortly thereafter, Peter, Paul and Mary announced their breakup, and Jacob was suddenly without two of his most important clients. He remarked later about this turning point that he felt exhausted from too much touring, and not just rock and pop music, but also corporate events for Holiday Magic, a multi-level marketing firm that organized meetings across North and South America, supported by sound systems from McCune. Jacob said all of that touring "was enough to drive you crazy."

== Broadway ==
=== Hair ===
During his time touring with Peter, Paul and Mary, Jacob was introduced by Yarrow to producer Michael Butler. Butler requested Jacob help with poor sound in the Boston staging of Hair, so Jacob flew to Boston in February 1970 to see what he could do. Jacob brought a rock music esthetic to the theatre for the first time, adding more loudspeakers for more volume, and he used more microphones in fixed locations, more band and singing microphones, and one of the early VHF wireless microphones by Edcor used on a few songs. Lighting designer Jules Fisher said the improvement to the sound quality was immediately apparent. With this success in Boston, Fisher and Jacob were sent to other cities to assist in the mounting of new productions of Hair, including overseas travel to Europe where they helped local lighting and sound crews attain similar results, modernizing musical theatre in the process. Fisher said that insular theatre crews in England and France in 1970 were locked into their traditional methods, and that Jacob's sound and Fisher's lighting designs were much more dynamic and unusual, difficult to convey to the locals, and difficult to implement: "we were teaching everybody; plus we had the language barrier." In January 1971, Jacob redesigned the original Hair production on Broadway. Butler said "Abe made a big difference" in the sound of Hair. Theatre sound historian David Collison noticed that Jacob called himself a sound designer, which was not common at the time.

=== Jesus Christ Superstar ===
In 1970, the concept album Jesus Christ Superstar was released, peaking in the U.S. Billboard Top 200 in February and May 1971. A corresponding musical theatre version was planned for the Mark Hellinger Theatre on Broadway, to open in October 1971. The musical's director was Tom O'Horgan, the lighting design was by Jules Fisher, and the scenic design was by Robin Wagner, all three having worked with Jacob on Hair, but Jonathan Taplin was asked to design sound. Jacob was covering assignments for McCune, working for Three Dog Night. Presented with a week off between concerts, he traveled to New York to see his colleagues and their new show which was in preview mode. On September 28, he found that the expected preview performance of Jesus Christ Superstar was cancelled, but he went to the Hellinger anyway to talk to his friends. Upon arrival, O'Horgan told Jacob that the show was having serious sound problems, and implored Jacob to fix them. Producer Robert Stigwood arranged for Jacob to take over the next day as sound designer. At rehearsal, Jacob found a critical issue: the show relied on multiple wireless microphones from England which were not working well together, taking hits from radio frequency interference caused by intermodulation, a kind of spurious radio signal formed in the presence of two or more transmission frequencies acting upon each other. From his experience at Hair, Jacob recognized that the technology for wireless microphones was not yet advanced enough for multiple units working at the same time. Because of this, Jacob instituted a radical change, putting aside the multiple wireless system and instead specifying a variety of wired microphones in the style of Hair. The Jesus Christ Superstar troupe was forced to reorganize their choreography to adjust to the new microphone positions, and Wagner had to rework some scenic elements to hide the microphones, but this was quickly accomplished. Three nights of preview performances had been cancelled, losing $36,000 in ticket sales, but two days' worth of Jacob's fixes allowed the show to open on the fourth preview night. Jacob stayed with the production, arguing for further improvements to the sound such as uncovering the orchestra pit which had been sealed by Taplin for isolation reasons but had been stifling the musicians with heat, and was giving a muffled sound to the instruments. He also replaced the insufficient JBL Paragon home hi-fi loudspeakers with the McCune JM3, rigging two over the proscenium, and flanking the stage with two more to bring the spatial imaging down to the level of the performers. During this time, Jacob developed a lasting relationship with Masque Sound's John "Jack" Shearing, a New York sound company owner who was friendly with the Broadway union stagehands of IATSE Local 1. Shearing helped smooth the way for Jacob's concepts to be introduced to the stagehands who were habitually suspicious of new ideas, and who had contributed to previous failures. Jacob trained union sound operator Michael "Mike" O'Keefe to run the mixer for Jesus Christ Superstar; O'Keefe and Jacob continued to work together off and on for decades. Union sound operators in New York were called assistant electricians at the time – there was no separate sound department. Having started his career as an electrician, O'Keefe later said of Jesus Christ Superstar, "It was my first experience with a sound console; it had sixteen faders. I couldn't believe they miked the whole orchestra and could accentuate each instrument. It was amazing."

For his work on Jesus Christ Superstar, Jacob was credited as sound designer in Playbill, the leading Broadway theatre industry magazine. Jacob's was the second such credit, following Jack Mann's sound designer credit for the 1961 staging of Show Girl, a short-lived musical revue starring Carol Channing. Jesus Christ Superstar was nominated for five Tony Awards, including Best Lighting and Best Scenic Design, but there was no Tony Award at the time for sound design.

=== Bicoastal ===
As Jacob was working on Jesus Christ Superstar, Hendrix's former manager Michael Jeffery asked him to serve as president of Electric Lady Studios. While keeping his San Francisco address, Jacob rented an apartment in the Greenwich Village neighborhood of Manhattan starting in June 1972, and in July he took over as president, to organize the Hendrix tapes and to keep the studio in operation. But when Jeffery died in March 1973, a legal battle arose between the estates of Jeffery and Hendrix. Declining to take sides, Jacob ended his contract with the studio, and shifted instead to a new venture with Chip Monck: CMI Consultants, a company for producing conventions and large events. Jacob also continued his freelance musical sound design work, covering several short-lived musicals during 1972–1974. One notable effort in 1973 was the National Lampoon comedy Lemmings, which ran for a year, and launched the careers of John Belushi, Christopher Guest, and Chevy Chase. Jacob said of their rock festival parody that it was both funny and personally meaningful. Jacob also designed the sound for the touring rock opera The Who's Tommy which was successful on the road.

In 1974, Lou Adler asked Jacob to lead the sound design for a new production of The Rocky Horror Show at the Roxy Theatre in West Hollywood. Jacob's rock and roll style of presentation was well received. Author and composer Richard O'Brien, who had performed in Hair and Jesus Christ Superstar, said that Jacob's sound was "delicious", and that Jacob "was one of the greatest sound people in the world." In 1975, Adler tapped Jacob to design the New York staging of the musical.

=== Pippin ===
Choreographer Bob Fosse was impressed with Jacob's work on Jesus Christ Superstar, and asked producer Stuart Ostrow to hire him for Pippin. Jacob participated in the earliest discussions about staging and choreography; the first time sound design was integrated from the beginning. For Pippin, Jacob used shotgun microphones as foot mics, overhead area mics and scenery spot mics. In many cases Fosse directed the performers in front of particular shotguns to bring their voices to the fore. Sound designer Otts Munderloh was working nearby on Sugar but he would sneak into Pippin to hear the difference. Munderloh found that Pippin's sound "was much better" than Sugar's, "much crisper, cleaner and louder, because of the shotguns..." As well, orchestrator Ralph Burns spent time with Jacob and sound console operator Larry Spurgeon to point out important instrumental cues. Pippin ran from 1972 to 1977 to become one of the longest-running Broadway musicals.

=== Beatles music ===
Jacob was called by O'Horgan, Stigwood and Wagner to design sound in late 1974 for Sgt. Pepper's Lonely Hearts Club Band on the Road, a Beatles tribute mounted off Broadway because of a rising backlash against rock musicals. Scenery was by Wagner and lighting was by Fisher. Jacob assembled a quadraphonic sound system based on a four-bus mixer from England of the sort used by Pink Floyd in 1973 for their touring production of Dark Side of the Moon. The console contained a quad panning system controlled by joysticks, to send selected sounds around the venue. In 1976, Jacob designed a complex and inventive sound system for Rockabye Hamlet, but the show lasted only a week.

Beatlemania, another Beatles musical, was conceived in 1976 by Fisher, by now a frequent collaborator and friend of Jacob. It was to be an evolving concert experience with very little dialogue. All of the songs would be presented as faithfully as possible to the Beatles' original versions, which posed a challenge. Jacob designed the sound to include unseen, offstage performers for some parts, and he specified a Mellotron keyboard sampler fitted with tape loops of pre-recorded arrangements such as cello and brass parts, the backwards tape sounds emulating "I Am the Walrus", and musique concrète elements to mimic the Beatles' sound collage "Revolution 9". Jacob specified that the piccolo trumpet part in "Penny Lane" would be panned around the room to four speaker locations, an enhancement to the Beatles' stereo recording. To produce the uniquely repetitive "Shuk-k-ka" sound at the beginning of "Come Together", Jacob and New York sound mixer Larry Spurgeon used an Eventide Harmonizer set to delay mode to work out a method which must be repeated by hand at every performance. Another sound board operator was required to mix monitors for the band, and to operate various tape machines including a recording of Jacob himself asking the audience to "refrain from smoking... anthing!" Jacob consulted with ex-McCune loudspeaker designer John Meyer to arrive at an appropriate loudspeaker arrangement of four JM3 mains per side plus additional McCune SM3 surround speakers, and he pushed hard to get the mixing console placed in the center of the main audience seating area, just like a modern rock concert. Producers were loath to lose these premium seats which would otherwise hold paying customers, but it gave the sound board operator much finer control over the sound balance, and Fisher backed Jacob in this successful demand. Jacob had previously argued for better mix positions, but with smaller victories such as moving the sound operator from the stage wings to the rear of the balcony seating. Beatlemania was an enormous hit, running for more than a thousand performances on Broadway, and expanding simultaneously into multiple cities. Sound designer Steve Canyon Kennedy said "Beatlemania was the best sounding show I ever heard in my life – to this day! There was nothing like it..."

Jacob designed sound for his third and final Beatles tribute production in 2010, which was also his last Broadway credit in Playbill. The show was Rain: A Tribute to the Beatles, brought to the Neil Simon Theatre after years of touring. For the audience mix, Jacob specified a DiGiCo SD8 digital mixing console, and he spread the sound field wider with surround effects. The sound system was a combination of vertical line array, horizontal arrays, and individual loudspeakers, all from Meyer Sound. The digital monitor mixer was a Yamaha PM5D sending the performers their own mixes via wireless in-ear monitors.

=== A Chorus Line ===
Jacob found himself working for two famous choreographers in 1975, starting with Fosse calling him to fix some audio problems Chicago was having during tryouts in Philadelphia, then with Michael Bennett who needed advice about how the offstage band would work in A Chorus Line. Jacob bounced between Philadelphia and New York for six weeks. To help Chicago he placed a wireless lavalier microphone in the wig of Gwen Verdon, as she was dancing in a tight-fitting bustier, and the wireless bodypack was too visible anywhere else. This was the first time that a wireless microphone was hidden at the hairline – a now-common technique popularized in 1985 when Andrew Bruce pioneered a large-scale implementation for all of the principal performers in the original London cast of Les Misérables.

Jacob was asked to bring a more subdued, naturalistic tone to A Chorus Line which was supposed to look like an audition-in-progress for most of the show. Jacob put a row of shotgun mics at the front edge of the stage, and Bennett devised a choreography to fit the very visible microphone positions. The show opened at The Public Theater off Broadway, where there was no orchestra pit, and the offstage band was squeezed into the loading dock to which Jacob had applied soundproofing. With success off Broadway, the show was moved to the Shubert Theatre to open in July 1975. Jacob augmented the setup with more shotgun microphones to pick up sounds from mid-stage and upstage (the rear of the stage). An offstage vocal booth was added for two singers whose voices were subtly mixed into chorus numbers. As well, Jacob used a large EMT plate reverb unit to fill out the singing voices. The Shubert's orchestra pit was covered in acoustically transparent black gauze to help the audience forget the presence of the band. Jacob wanted to use four McCune JM3 loudspeakers but the rental cost was nixed by the producer, and Altec 9846 self-powered cabinets were used instead, powered in this case by distant amplifiers so that the sound crew could more easily correct a potential amplifier problem. Two 16-channel stereo mixers were specified by Jacob, custom made by Louis Stevenson of Houston. The orchestra was mixed on one of them, with the results patched into the second Stevenson as a stereo stem, for blending with the vocal and area mics. Main loudspeakers were positioned at two levels, mezzanine and orchestra, augmented by stereo pairs of under-balcony and upper balcony speakers. Unusually, the mix position out in the audience was joined by a cast member: Zach (Robert LuPone), the show's authoritarian director, ostensibly conducted the auditions from a desk next to Otts Munderloh, the sound operator. During the performance, Jacob's sound design required a building engineer in the basement to switch off the air conditioning system for a few minutes while the dancer named Paul (Sammy Williams) gave a personally revealing speech. This temporary lowering of the venue's noise floor provided extra psychological tension.

A Chorus Line was such a success that two more companies were assembled, one traveling to San Francisco and then settling in Los Angeles, the other traveling to Toronto and then settling in London. Jacob supervised sound design for both, and accompanied the California troupe. Munderloh headed the sound department of the Toronto staging, then Jacob flew to London where he visited the play City Sugar and heard excellent sound by freelance sound mixer Jonathan Deans working for Autograph Sound. Jacob specified Autograph and Deans to install and operate sound for A Chorus Line at the Drury Lane in London – the start of a long relationship between Jacob and Autograph. Deans said that "A Chorus Line was a huge change for the audio industry..."

== Concerts ==
List of audio engineering assignments for live shows
| Date | Artist | Event | Location | Notes |
|---|---|---|---|---|
| 1966-08-29 | The Beatles | US tour | Candlestick Park | Assistant to Mort Feld |
| 1966–10 | The Mamas and the Papas | US tour | various, starting at the Commonwealth Armory in Boston | |
| 1967–01 | The Mamas and the Papas | concerts | Berkeley Community Theatre and Sacramento Memorial Auditorium | |
| 1967–06 | The Mamas and the Papas, Ravi Shankar | Monterey Pop Festival | Monterey County Fairgrounds | Jacob designed the sound system and assisted each act on stage. He mixed the Mamas and the Papas, and also Ravi Shankar. |
| 1967-08-09 | The Jimi Hendrix Experience | US tour | Ambassador Theater (Washington, D.C.) | Four nights, August 9–12 |
| 1967-08-18 | The Mamas and the Papas, the Jimi Hendrix Experience | US tour | Hollywood Bowl | |
| 1967–10 | Simon and Garfunkel | concerts | Oregon | |
| 1967–11 | The Jimi Hendrix Experience | Europe tour | Sweden, UK, France, the Netherlands, Ireland, Denmark | Late 1967 to January 1968 |
| 1968–02 | The Jimi Hendrix Experience | US tour | 50 venues, starting with The Fillmore | February to May 1968 |
| 1968-03-15 | Peter, Paul and Mary | concert | Carnegie Hall | |
| 1968–05 | The Jimi Hendrix Experience | Europe tour | Italy, Switzerland | |
| 1967-08-31 | various | Sky River Rock Festival | Sultan, Washington | August 31 to September 2 |
| 1968–10 | Cass Elliot | concert series | Caesars Palace | |
| 1969–01 | The Jimi Hendrix Experience | Europe tour | Sweden, Denmark, Germany, France, Austria, UK | January and February |
| 1969–05 | various | Northern California Folk-Rock Festival | Santa Clara County Fairgrounds | May 23 to 25 |
| 1969–07 | Peter, Paul and Mary | US tour | 160 dates | July through December |
| 1969-11-15 | Peter, Paul and Mary and others | Moratorium March on Washington | National Mall | Performers included John Denver, Arlo Guthrie, the Cleveland Quartet, and four touring companies of Hair |
| 1970-05-30 | The Jimi Hendrix Experience | concert | Berkeley Community Theatre | Jacob assisted Wally Heider with recording. Concert excerpts appear on Rainbow Bridge. |
| 1970-07-17 | Blood, Sweat and Tears, Gordon Lightfoot | concert | Hollywood Bowl | |
| 1970-08-30 | The Jimi Hendrix Experience | Isle of Wight Festival | Isle of Wight | Scheduled as August 30, delayed to early August 31. Excerpts released as Isle of Wight, full set released as Blue Wild Angel: Live at the Isle of Wight |
| 1970-08-31 | The Jimi Hendrix Experience | The Cry of Love Tour, European leg | Sweden, Denmark, Germany | six dates beginning August 31 |
| 1970–12 | Laura Nyro, Jackson Browne | US tour | L.A., San Diego, Berkeley, NYC | |
| 1971-07-09 | Three Dog Night | US tour | Atlanta–Fulton County Stadium | Jacob served as the video director for close-up shots |
| 1971–08 | Carole King | concert series | Greek Theatre (Los Angeles) | Four nights starting August 18 |
| 1971-09-18 | James Taylor | concert | Hollywood Bowl | |
| 1972-04-15 | Barbra Streisand, Carole King, James Taylor, Quincy Jones | Four for McGovern | The Forum (Inglewood, California) | Streisand released Live Concert at the Forum from this performance |
| 1972-12-31 | Bette Midler | concert | Philharmonic Hall | |
| 1979–09 | Shirley Bassey | concert series | Minskoff Theatre | five nights starting September 3 |
| 1981–09 | Shirley Bassey | concert series | Carnegie Hall | four nights starting September 30 |
| 1986-07-04 | New York Philharmonic and others | Liberty Weekend | Central Park | three days starting July 4 |
| 1986-10-28 | New York Philharmonic, Sherrill Milnes, Charles Aznavour, Plácido Domingo, Julio Iglesias | Statue of Liberty Centennial | Avery Fisher Hall | |
| 1988-05-01 | various | Opening Gala | Bass Performance Hall, Fort Worth | |
| 1988-07-13 | various | New York International Festival of the Arts | Central Park | |
| 1988-10-21 | various | Opening Gala | Procter & Gamble Hall, Aronoff Center | |

== Bibliography ==
- Thomas, Richard K. (2008). The Designs of Abe Jacob. United States Institute for Theatre Technology. ISBN 978-1-933348-14-8.
- Pisfil, Sergio (2019). "Loud Rock Music? Live Sound on Stage, 1967–1973". In Fiona Jane Schopf (ed.). Music on Stage. Vol. 3. Cambridge Scholars Publishing. pp. 136–154. ISBN 9781527526952.
