= Meagher =

Meagher can refer to:

- Meagher Electronics
- Meagher (surname), people with the surname Meagher
- Meaghers Grant, Nova Scotia
