= Davide Lombardi =

Award-winning live sound engineer

Davide Lombardi (born 1982 in Italy), is a live sound engineer who specializes and sets up audio systems in concert. For years, Davide Lombardi has contributed to rock musicians, pop artists, actors, opera performers, and musical productions.

== Early life and education ==
Lombardi began his career in music during his college years, working during school breaks. By the age of 18, he was already touring with Italian artists. At 21, he relocated to London to work at Britannia Row Production.

== Career ==
Throughout his career, Lombardi has contributed to numerous projects that integrate diverse musical genres and traditions. A publication in April 2019, stated Davide Lombardi has worked with several singers which include: Gary Barlow, Tom Jones, Thurston Moore, Dido, Bryan Ferry Judith Owen, Regina Spektor In an interview in 2016, He stated how he was able to balance the sounds system expectations and requirement when he was touring London with Will Young. His other notable collaborations in the industry are:

- Andrea Bocelli 30th Anniversary

Lombardi was responsible for handling the audio delivery as the sound manager to celebrate three decades of performing on some of the Worlds' biggest stages, Maestro has put on a three night hometown Lajatico, with some guest Artists, such as Ed Sheeran, Will Smith, Brian May, Shania Twain, Zucchero Fornaciari, Laura Pausini . For this event he used L-Acoustics speakers, with DPA microphones

- Andrea Bocelli

Lombardi leads audio production for Bocelli's public live events worldwide, including the recent stadium tour in Brazil and performances in Taormina, Sicily. He manages audio production, working with local suppliers on seating plans, sound design, microphone selection, monitoring, and utilizing the latest DiGiCo Quantum 852 mixing desks with L-Acoustics K series.

- Kate Bush

In 2014, Lombardi mixed in "Before the Dawn," a concert residency by Kate Bush at the Hammersmith Apollo in London, which consisted of 22 performances attended by nearly 80,000 people. A live recording of the same name was released in November 2016.

- Roxy Music

In March 2022, Lombardi was the FOH sound engineer in Roxy Music's 50th anniversary tour, their first tour since 2011. The tour spanned across Canada, the United States, and the United Kingdom during September and October 2022.

- Simply Red

Since 2019, Lombardi has been mixing live concerts for Simply Red, supporting their albums "Blue Eyed Soul" (2019) and "Time" (2023). At the Jazz Open Festival in Stuttgart, he successfully employed d&b Soundscape technology. He used Yamaha PM 5 and L-Acoustics K Series PA, controlled by Dolby Lake.

- Bryan Ferry

Since 2016, Lombardi has served as Bryan Ferry's live sound engineer, participating in global tours including performances at the Hollywood Bowl, and venues across Europe, Australia, Asia, and Greece, such as the Odeon of Herodes Atticus

In April 2021, Ferry released "Royal Albert Hall 2020," an album recorded and mixed by Lombardi during a concert at the Royal Albert Hall in March 2020, just before the COVID-19 lock-down.

== Sound Designer ==
In addition to his role as a sound engineer, Lombardi has also worked as a sound designer. His expertise has been utilized in significant events, including Foo Fighters' live performance at Wembley Stadium in 2008, as well as performances by Amy Winehouse, Oasis, Peter Gabriel, and James Taylor.

== Achievement and Awards ==
Lombardi has garnered significant recognition as a sound engineer, receiving notable achievements such as the Engineer of the year in 2015 for the work done on "Before the Dawn". He has also been nominated for several prestigious awards highlighting consistent contributions and impact in the field.

Year	Events	Work		
2015	Pro Sound Awards	Before The Dawn (Kate Bush)		Won
2016	FOH sound engineer for TPi Awards		Nominated	
2023	FOH sound engineer for TPi Awards		Nominated	
2025	FOH sound engineer for TPi		Nominated	
