= Meagher Electronics =

Meagher Electronics was a Monterey, California, company which was founded in 1947 by Jim Meagher. It included a recording studio which recorded early demos for Joan Baez, her sister, Mimi Farina and her sister's husband, Richard Farina. The company also repaired all sorts of home entertainment equipment, focusing on professional and semi professional sound equipment and high end home systems. It had a huge, high warehouse space in which literally hundreds of old wooden console radios and phonographs dating back to the 1920s were stacked to the rafters. Meagher used to explain that these had been left by customers who chose not to pick them up instead of paying the repair estimate charges.

The firm was also a commercial sound installation company and one of the first Altec Lansing dealers in the country, with catalogues and equipment going back to 1947. It provided the sound system for most of the concerts and live events in the Monterey area in the 1950s through the 1970s, from folk to jazz to Roger Williams It also recorded the first gold jazz album, Erroll Garner's Concert by the Sea in the mid-1950s on a portable mono Ampex 601 tape recorder which remained a prize possession for many years.

The Monterey Jazz Festival contracted Meagher to provide their sound reinforcement system from the beginning of its existence in 1958 and the firm was extremely conscientious about providing the best quality sound possible, often using recording quality condenser microphones and custom designed loudspeaker arrays. The company supplied sound reinforcement systems for the Big Sur Folk Festivals and assisted Harry McCune Sound from San Francisco and their sound designer Abe Jacob, who was contracted to provide the sound system for the Monterey Pop Festival in 1967.
