= McCune Audio/Video/Lighting =

McCune Audio Video Lighting
- Type: Audio/Video/Lighting Rental and Production
- Industry: Professional Audio
- Founded: 1932
- Headquarters: San Francisco, CA, United States
- Key people: Harry McCune, Founder
- Number of employees: 200
- Website: www.mccune.com

McCune Audio Video Lighting (previously known as Harry McCune Sound Service, McCune Audio Visual and McCune Audio Visual Video) was an American company based in South San Francisco, California, with offices in Monterey and Anaheim. McCune was one of the oldest and largest audio visual rental and sound services in the U.S. McCune was founded in 1932 by Harry McCune Sr, McCune AVL provided audio, lighting and high-definition video services to events as varied as outdoor festivals such as the Monterey Jazz Festival, and the Bohemian Grove, and to arena conferences such as TED.

In December 2017, Atlanta-based Shepard Exposition Services bought McCune.

On November 3, 2024, Shepard Exposition closed the McCune offices in South San Francisco and Monterey, and ceased use of the "McCune" name.

== History ==
Harry McCune, Sr. was working days as an automotive mechanic. At night, McCune also liked working on radio equipment, and small audio sound systems. McCune built a small amplified sound system, and he founded McCune Sound Service in 1932. He built several small sound systems before he completed one large enough to handle a large dance band. McCune would rent out his sound system, and personally operate the equipment for $1.00 an evening, on a Friday night. McCune would then give the equipment rental for free on the next Saturday night. Harry McCune began renting sound systems more often to various big bands in the 1930s and 1940s, and with his son, Harry McCune, Jr. (1930–1996), he would help radio engineers broadcast the concerts live over AM radio from ballrooms in San Francisco.

In the 1940s, McCune Sound operated out of 10 Brady Street in San Francisco, which was centrally located near the Civic Center. In 1963, McCune adopted the name "Channel X" for its video production services. In the 1960s, McCune operated from 960 Folsom Street in the South of Market (SOMA) area. In 1969, the company moved to 951 Howard Street, and built an audio and video recording studio within the structure. McCune later expanded to both sides of Howard Street. Still expanding, the company moved to a single large building on 2200 Army Street, later named Cesar Chavez Street, before moving to their current location at 101 Utah Avenue in South San Francisco.

McCune Sound has been credited with creating and improving some of the vital concepts of the modern day live concert performance, and was one of the first sound companies to provide road touring sound systems, beginning in 1965 with Herb Alpert & The Tijuana Brass and progressing to diverse acts as Andy Williams, Dionne Warwick, the Grateful Dead, Jefferson Airplane, Creedence Clearwater Revival, Steely Dan, John Davidson, Crystal Gayle, and many others. Sound mixer Mort Feld said in 1969 that if all the touring acts brought their McCune equipment back at the same time, there would not be room enough in the shop. One of the first times that a stage monitor was used for a live concert, the monitor was provided by McCune Sound. The concert was by Judy Garland, at the San Francisco Civic Auditorium. The concert rehearsal was not going well, and Harry McCune Jr. came up with the idea of pointing a stage speaker at Garland. McCune ran to his truck, and drove to the McCune office. McCune grabbed a loudspeaker, brought it back to the concert rehearsal, and then placed the speaker on the corner of the stage. He then took an audio feed off the main system, turned up the mixer, and Miss Garland was pleased with the added monitor sound. In the late 1960s the music scene was flourishing in San Francisco, and so was sound design itself. The Monterey Pop Festival and before that, the Beatles' last live concert performance, held at San Francisco's Candlestick Park, had sound systems provided by McCune Sound. During the Beatles' Candlestick concert the sound system could not be heard well over the screaming of the Beatles fans. Mort Feld of McCune Sound mixed the Candlestick Park house sound for the Beatles concert that day. In the late 1960s, engineer Dan Healy drew from McCune equipment to amplify the Grateful Dead; Healy said he sometimes blew up electrical circuits trying to get the audio louder. Starting in 1968, McCune Sound was included on band riders as one of the qualified sound companies for concerts. Other qualified sound companies included Swanson sound from Oakland, Clair Brothers from Lititz PA, Hanley sound from Boston and Kirnan sound from New York.

McCune thrived in the concert market during the early 1970s and 1980s, and even branched out into stage theatre, supplying equipment for East Coast companies like ProMix and Masque Sound, at the same time creating the famed "wall of sound" for the Grateful Dead, and creating touring systems for Jefferson Airplane, CCR and others.

Employees John Meyer and Bob Cavin created an active speaker system in 1971 known as the JM-3, named for John Meyer. This sound equipment was a three-way loudspeaker, tri-amped system that enclosed the power amplifiers and all of the integrated electronics associated with the loudspeakers in an external equipment rack with few or no controls, the settings having all been calibrated at the audio shop. The fully horn-loaded system was used on CCR's final tour. The amplifier enclosure also included preset crossover filters, limiters and equalization. The outside of the amplifier rack was simple: a two-circuit AC power cable connection, XLR connectors for input audio signal, and two 4-pin female twist-lock NEMA L14-30 connectors for carrying the amplified 3-way audio signal to two JM-3 loudspeakers.

McCune also branched into providing in-house audiovisual services in many California hotels, staffing them with equipment and technicians. The McCune in-house Southern California hotel accounts in the 1980s and 1990s included the Disneyland Hotel, the Queen Mary, the Hyatt Newporter, the Ritz Carlton Laguna Beach, the Sheraton Universal, the Doubletree Orange, and others. Bob Cavin was a pioneer in designing and building consoles, and systems designed and fabricated at McCune were being used on Broadway, with touring acts and at Las Vegas showrooms. Taking these McCune sound systems out to Broadway was Abe Jacob, who was an early and influential sound designer. Jacob got his start at McCune touring with Peter, Paul and Mary and several other acts. Abe moved to New York and worked on Jesus Christ Superstar, Evita, A Chorus Line, Beatlemania and many other shows using McCune equipment.

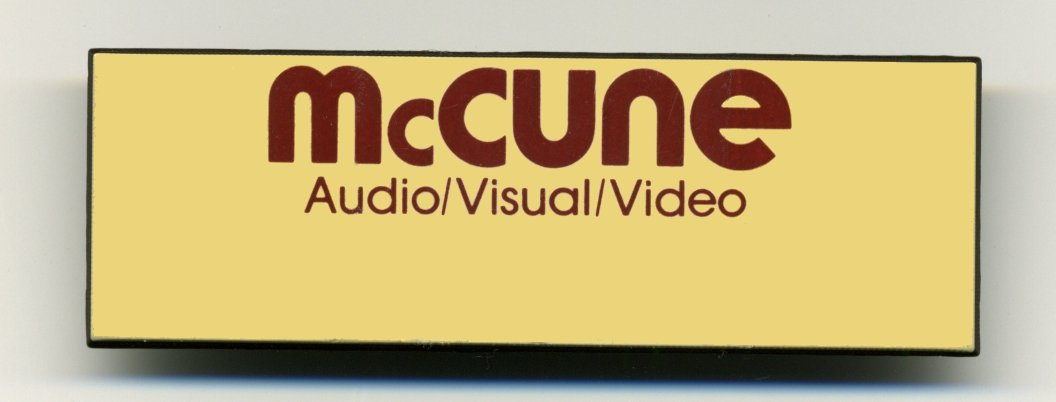
A blank McCune name badge from the 1980s. This placard style staff badge was worn by the McCune audio visual technicians and staff at the many in house hotel and convention center accounts where McCune provided contacted audio visual services.

Harry McCune Jr. had little desire to grow the speaker manufacturing process beyond the needs of his immediate clientele, which he believed the mass production of his speakers to sell might detract from his core sound rental business. Several McCune employees saw the future of stage and concert audio, and John Meyer later left McCune to form Meyer Sound Laboratories, while Ken Deloria and Bob Cavin formed Apogee Sound.

=== Former employees ===
- John Meyer, the founder of Meyer Sound Laboratories
- Bob Cavin
- Ken DeLoria, President and founder of the Petaluma-based Apogee Sound
- Abe Jacob
- Charles Ginsburg, project leader for the first practical video tape recorder
- Mort Feld Sound Mixer and General Manager

=== Notable events ===
- The Berkeley Jazz Festival
- Monterey Pop Festival
- Monterey Jazz Festival
- Playboy Jazz Festival
- TED
- Bohemian Grove
- 1984 Democratic National Convention in San Francisco
- XI International AIDS Conference, 1996
- The Beatles final Concert
- Olympic Games, various venues, Los Angeles 1984
