= Monterey County Fairgrounds =

- Interactive map of Monterey County Fairgrounds
- 36°35′40″N 121°51′45″W
- Location: Monterey County, California, United States

Monterey County Fairgrounds is the site of the annual Monterey County Fair. It is located within the city limits of Monterey, California.

== History ==
The Monterey County Fairgrounds was built in 1936. The fairgrounds was the location of the Monterey Pop Festival in 1967. The Monterey Pop Festival is a well known precursor to many notable musical and cultural movements throughout the 1960s and 1970s. The fairgrounds claims to still have access to Jimi Hendrix's guitar burn marks, from where he lit his guitar on fire during the 1967 Pop Festival.

Other notable musicians hosted by the fairgrounds include Duke Ellington, Billy Dean, Bob Dylan, Jack Johnson, Louis Armstrong, Etta James, Buffalo Springfield, The Mamas and Papas, The Grateful Dead and The Who.

== Musical events ==
The fairgrounds is the site of the Monterey Jazz Festival, the California Roots Music and Arts Festival, and other musical concerts and festivals.
