= L-Acoustics =

French audio equipment manufacturer

- Type: Professional Audio Manufacturer
- Industry: Professional audio
- Founded: 1984
- Headquarters: Marcoussis, France
- Key people: Christian Heil, Founder; Herve Guillaume, CEO L-Acoustics Group; Laurent Vaissie, CEO L-Acoustics;
- Products: Loudspeakers, Amplifier, Signal processing, Software
- Number of employees: ~1200
- Website: www.l-acoustics.com

L-Acoustics is a French manufacturer of loudspeakers, amplifiers, and signal processing devices. Headquartered in Marcoussis, south of Paris, the company has offices in the United States, United Kingdom, Singapore, and Germany.

== History ==
In September 1984, Dr. Christian Heil, a physicist in the field of elementary particles with an interest in acoustics, created an electro-acoustic engineering firm named C.HEIL.TEA, later to be renamed L-Acoustics. In 1989, the company launched its MTD115, a coaxial loudspeaker for sound reinforcement use.

In 1992, Heil and his team developed line source array loudspeakers with their V-DOSC system, using the company's Wavefront Sculpture Technology (WST) theory. Based on principles developed by Heil and physicist Professor Marcel Urban, WST defined five criteria for design and use of line source arrays. The WST uses a patented DOSC waveguide, which was the first high-frequency device capable of creating a rectangular, constant-phase planar output.

Although Heil did not invent the underlying theory of the line array, his research and design work ultimately resulted in the V-DOSC system . Today, most professional audio loudspeaker manufacturers have adopted the line array model for their touring systems.

L-Acoustics later introduced other products, including the ARCS Constant Curvature Array (1995), dV-DOSC modular line source (1999), Kudo with K-Louver variable directivity (2005), P Series self-powered coaxials (2006), SB28 subwoofer with laminar vents and LA4 and LA8 amplified controllers (2007). The company also introduced their Soundvision simulation software in 2004, designed to allow system designers to create accurate 3D acoustical models of potential systems using the company's products.

In 2008, 15 years after the launch of V-DOSC, L-Acoustics introduced the K1 system, designed primarily for large festivals and stadium sound reinforcement applications. Distribution of the earliest K1 systems sold was limited to a small number of touring sound companies that agreed to participate in the manufacturer's K1/Kudo Pilot Program, providing feedback to L-Acoustics’ R&D team on its field performance.

In 2010 the manufacturer introduced the Kara and Kara(i) WST line source enclosures, and SB18 and SB18i subwoofers.

The K1 stadium line array system was awarded the top prize for "Indispensable Technology – Audio" at the 10th annual Parnelli Awards ceremony held at the Rio All Suites Hotel & Casino in Las Vegas on October 22, 2010.

In 2014 the K2 received the Prolight + Sound International Press Award.

L-Acoustics is a pioneer in immersive sound for live events through their proprietary L-ISA technology. This technology has been deployed in many high-profile events from the Expo 2020 in Dubai to Adele's residency at the Las Vegas Colosseum, Katy Perry's Play residency at Resorts World Las Vegas, and Bon Iver's 2022 tour.

In 2023, L-Acoustics launched the L Series during their Keynote at the Hollywood Bowl, a new concept and family of line-source arrays offering a substantial reduction in weight, size, and setup time. A major update to L-Acoustics' immersive ecosystem was also announced with the launch of L-ISA 3.0. The L2 received the "best of show" award at the 2024 ISE tradeshow in Barcelona. At the same tradeshow, a showcase of the latest family of amplified controllers was unveiled. Which included the LA7.16(i), and the LA2Xi. 2023 also marked the introduction of L-Acoustics first network converter, the LC16D

Toward the rear half of 2024, L-Acoustics celebrated its 40th anniversary, 850+ of the company's employees were invited to join in the celebration. Which began as a river boat ride on the iconic seine river, and concluded at an event at 'La Sein Musicale'

In May 2025, L-Acoustics hosted a smaller scale keynote event at the roundhouse in London. The event included the introduction of a smaller scale amplified controller LA1.16, and L-Acoustics DJ among other announcements.

In May 2026, the company hosted a keynote event at the Hollywood Bowl to introduce the L1 line source system, the CS1 cardioid subwoofer, and Source Intelligence technology. Built around Progressive Ultra-Dense Line Source (PULS) technology, the L1 features a high concentration of transducers designed to maximize forward output while minimizing low-frequency rear spill. Because the system requires fewer enclosures to achieve the sound pressure levels of previous K1 models, the updated hardware design reduces transport footprint, cable requirements, and rigging complexity for large-scale tours.
