= Ampex 601 =

Model of reel-to-reel tape recorder

The Ampex 601 was a portable, analog, reel-to-reel tape recorder produced by The Ampex Corporation from the mid-1950s through the 1960s. Ampex manufactured a single-channel model (the 601) and dual-channel version (the 601-2). The suitcase-sized, 26 lb. unit was designed for the professional recording applications. It recorded to ¼-inch tape on 5-inch or 7-inch reels.

The Ampex 601 was preceded by the Ampex 600. Although there was no officially-released Ampex 600-2, there were factory bulletins available which detailed how to change the second electronics to support the equivalent of 600-2 mode, and this made use of the 601-2's head stack possible, thereby creating the functional equivalent of a 600-2.

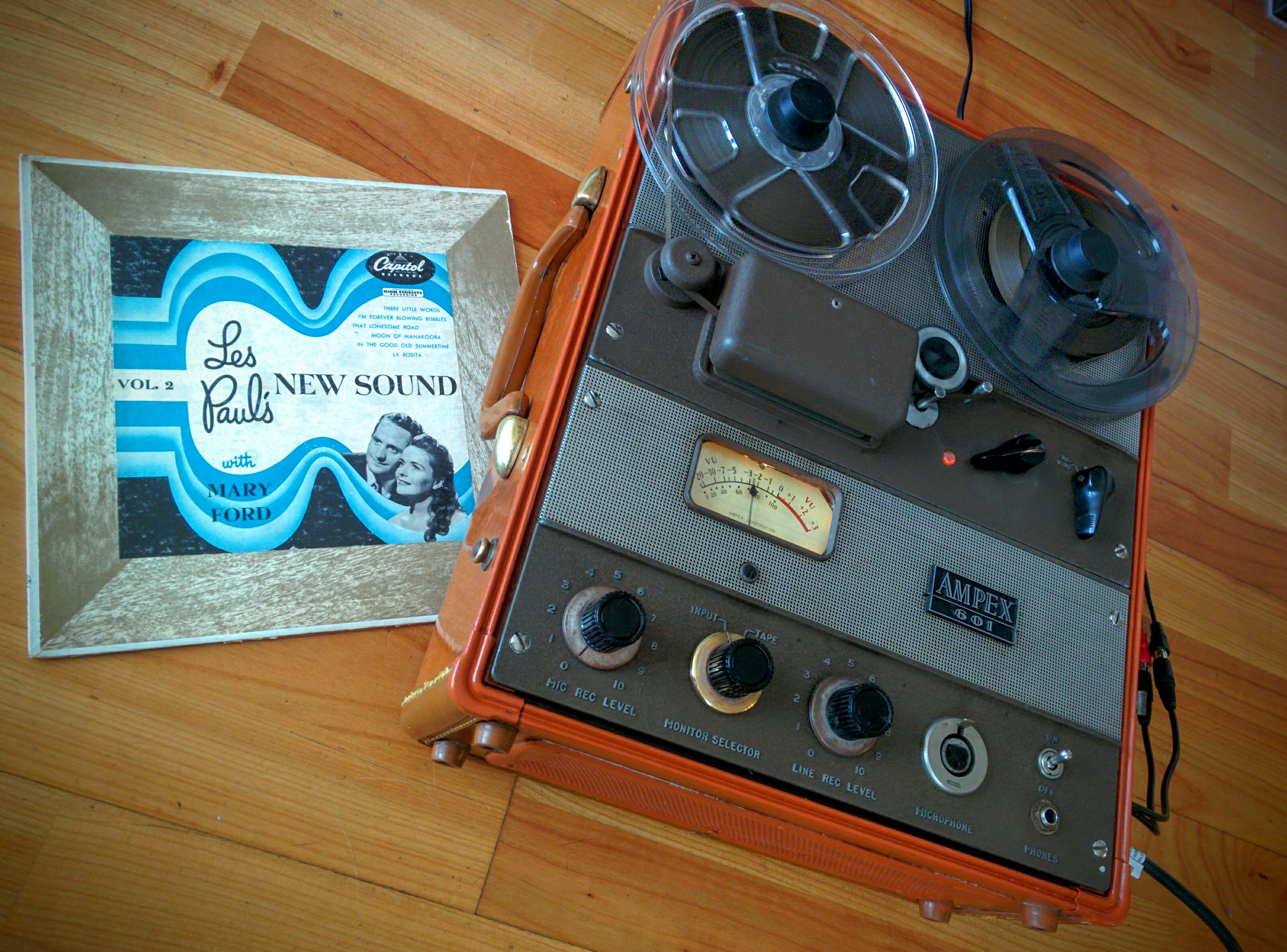
Ampex 601 playing a recording of "Les Paul's New Sound". Made in Redwood City, California. Circa 1956.

The Ampex 601 was succeeded by the Ampex 602, which was available as 602 and 602-2 models. The Ampex 600 and 601 were housed in light brown Samsonite cases. Optionally, the machine could be 19" rack-mounted, using an adapter plate. The Ampex 602 was housed in a dark brown Samsonite case with similar rack-mounting provisions. Companion speaker-amplifiers were also available, and were housed in the same style cases. Models 620, 621 and 622.

== Sources ==
- https://web.archive.org/web/20100521094749/http://eshop1.chem.buffalo.edu/AMPEX.html
- http://jproc.ca/rrp/ampex_601.html
- https://web.archive.org/web/20060929035149/http://ftp.ampex.com/ampex/manuals/audio/601man/601schem.gif (schematic)
- https://web.archive.org/web/20060929035309/http://ftp.ampex.com/ampex/manuals/audio/601man/601-man.pdf (owner's manual, PDF)
