= John Meyer (sound engineer) =

American audio engineer

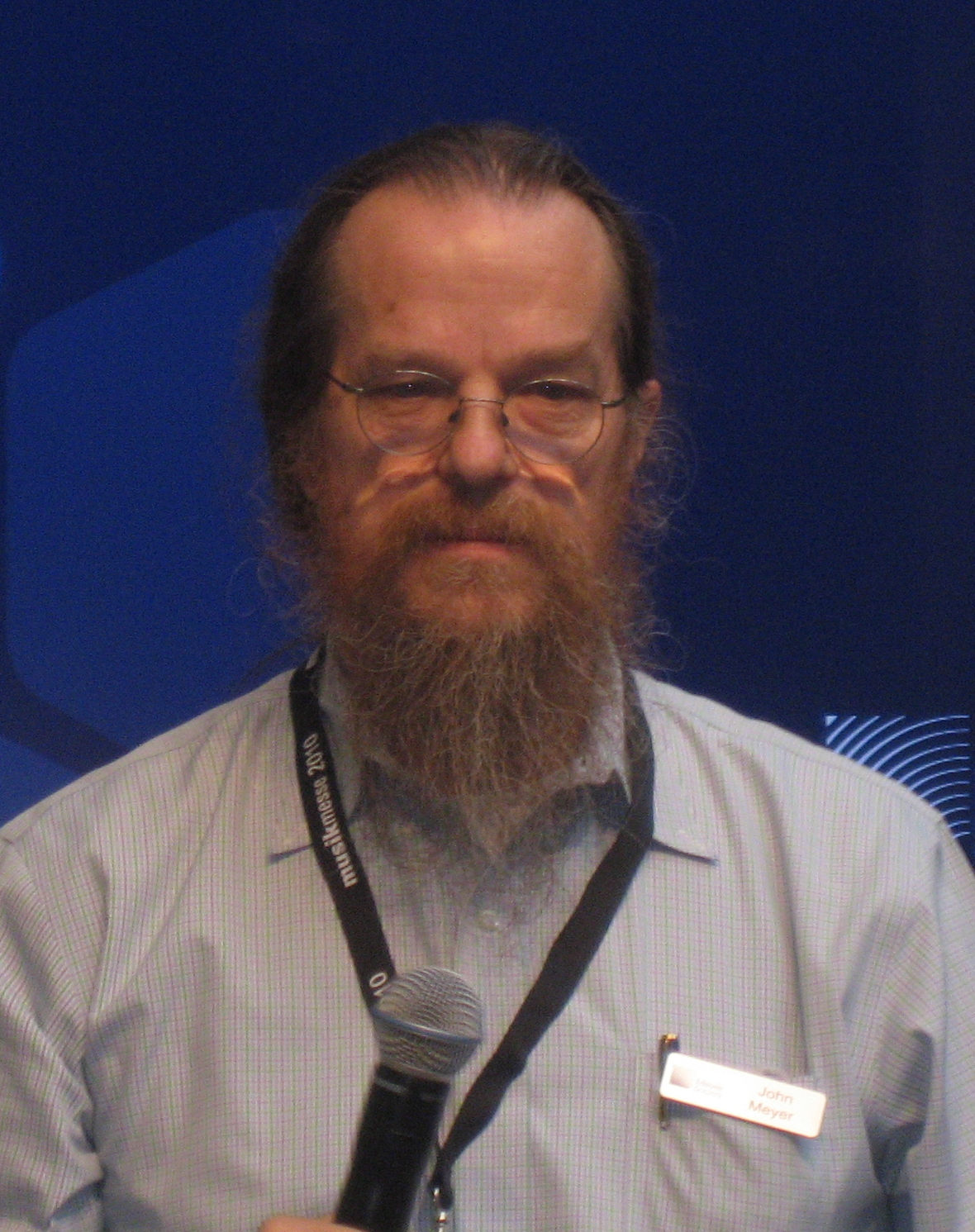

John Meyer is a pioneer in the sound reinforcement industry. In 1979 he founded Meyer Sound Laboratories with his wife, Helen Meyer.

== Biography ==
John Meyer grew up in Berkeley, California. His earliest involvement with audio was in the late 1950s at the radio station KPFA. He received a radiotelephone third class license at 12 years old, and a second class license when he was 15. He attended Oakland High which was one of the first schools in the country to have an audio department. In the audio department he would build consoles and other audio devices

John Meyer started his career in 1967 working in a Berkeley hi-fi store doing custom installs. There he met Steve Miller, who was looking to outfit his band. John Meyer assembled a custom amplification system for The Steve Miller Band when they appeared at the Monterey Pop Festival. John worked with Jim Meagher of Meagher Electronics at the Monterey Pop Festival.

Soon after John Meyer started a company called Glyph to design and build sound reinforcement systems. Glyph's first installation was at a San Rafael club called Pepperland. It was a pure exponential horn-loaded bi-amped quadraphonic sound system. Each stack included a white fiberglass bass, mid-range and hi frequency horns. The bass horns were huge, measuring 8×8 feet with 30-inch drivers. This system was used from 1969 until 1970 when Pepperland closed down.

In 1971 he started working for McCune Sound Service. McCune was interested in building reliable transportable sound systems. While at McCune John first realized his idea of a fully integrated loudspeaker system. The system was built for Creedence Clearwater Revival's last tour. It was a fully integrated tri-amped, horn-loaded system with processing electronics. Three amps were built into a rack-mountable enclosure that would drive two speakers. The enclosure also included preset cross-overs and equalization. The outside of the enclosure was simple: an AC cord, input connectors, and 4-pin connectors that plugged into the loudspeakers. The original model did not have level controls or a power switch.

While at McCune, John Meyer started doing sound reinforcement work with outdoor classical music symphony concerts at Stanford University. This led to an involvement with the Institute of Advanced Music Studies in Montreux, Switzerland which was exploring the idea of building a high-quality sound reinforcement system for classical music. In 1973, he was invited to establish an acoustics lab and perform research at the Institute. One of his primary goals was to research the origins of non-linearity in audio transducers. He spent one and a half years in Switzerland. While there, he designed a modular loudspeaker system and a high-frequency horn driver that led directly to some of the initial innovations at Meyer Sound Laboratories.

During the early 1970s, Meyer was involved with the Grateful Dead, providing them audio advice and performing audio research and experimentation with Don Pearson and Owsley Stanley.

In the 1970s, Meyer met his future wife Helen, a neighbor in Berkeley. John and Helen's first official date was at Thos Tenney, the high-end hi-fi store in Berkeley at which he was working, to listen to Sgt. Pepper's Lonely Hearts Club Band on a pair of Klipschorns. This was Helen's first introduction to quality sound reproduction.

John and Helen founded Meyer Sound Laboratories in 1979 after his return from Switzerland. The company was started in San Leandro, California, and then moved to Berkeley, California.

In 2005, Meyer was made a Fellow of the Audio Engineering Society, and in 2007, he was awarded the organization's Silver Medal.
