= Ed Long (audio engineer) =

Inventor of time alignment for loudspeakers

Ed Long

Edward M. Long (1932 – December 17, 2016) was an audio engineer known for introducing the first near-field studio monitors and the first Time-Aligned loudspeaker crossover.

In 2021, Ed Long was inducted into the TEC Awards Technology Hall of Fame for his development of the concept of near-field monitoring.

== Career ==
Long was born in Canandaigua, New York. During the Korean War he taught pulse techniques, multiplexing and FM theory at Fort Monmouth Signal School. He completed his engineering studies at Fisher College in 1957. Long became a project engineer at Sylvania Home electronics and did design work on loudspeaker systems there and also at Audio Dynamics Corporation. He later became senior acoustics engineer at C.T.S. of Paducah, Inc., where he assisted in the manufacture of loudspeaker systems. In 1968 he joined Ampex Corporation as a senior acoustics engineer. [8] In 1972 he moved to Northern California and formed Calibration Standard Instrument, a consulting firm and manufacture of loudspeaker systems.

Long developed a passive crossover for loudspeakers which aligned the bandpasses in time. Invented and trademarked in 1976 as "Time Alignment", the crossover design was influential in loudspeaker development from the late 1970s throughout the 1980s.

Long and Ronald J. Wickersham developed and patented a method for extending low-frequency response of a loudspeaker [9]. Bag End Licensed and implemented the patent into subwoofer. products known as ELF speakers.

== Personal life ==
Long retired in 2003. He died on December 17, 2016, at his home in San Jose, California, at the age of 84.
