= Meyer Sound Laboratories =

American audio equipment manufacturer

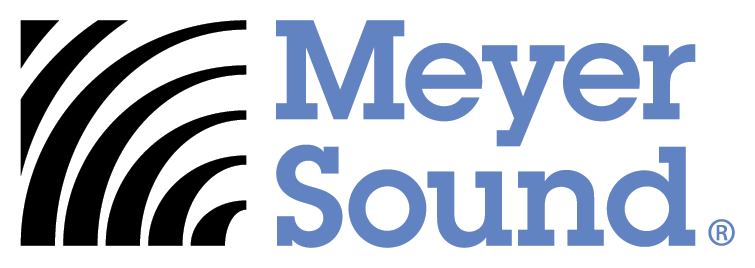
- Type: Professional Audio Manufacturer
- Industry: Professional Audio
- Founded: 1979
- Headquarters: Berkeley, CA, United States
- Key people: John & Helen Meyer, Founders
- Products: Loudspeakers, Digital Audio Systems, Audio Analysis Tools
- Number of employees: Around 300 (2015)
- Website: www.meyersound.com

Meyer Sound Laboratories is an American company based in Berkeley, California that manufactures self-powered loudspeakers, multichannel audio show control systems, electroacoustic architecture, and audio analysis tools for the professional sound reinforcement, fixed installation, and sound recording industries.

Some symphony halls and performing arts facilities utilize Meyer Sound products, such as the rehearsal area at Davies Symphony Hall in San Francisco, Svetlanov Hall in Moscow, Russia, and the Musikverein in Vienna, Austria. Meyer Sound's Constellation acoustic system is used to manage outdoor sound at the New World Center in Miami, Florida, which is the headquarters for the New World Symphony.

== History ==
In 1979, John and Helen Meyer established Meyer Sound to produce reliable high-fidelity products for sound reinforcement professionals. Meyer Sound's first product was the ACD/John Meyer studio monitor, based on a design Meyer developed while heading the acoustics laboratory at the Institute for Advanced Musical Studies in Switzerland. Prior to the founding of Meyer Sound, the Meyers started a relatively short-lived company named Glyph, which, in part, provided large speakers that were four to eight feet in diameter. However, bands were unable to bring the gigantic speakers with them when they traveled. Prior to this, John Meyer developed a sound system named "Glyph", which used said large loudspeakers. During this time period, Meyer was also involved in developing and constructing custom mixing consoles.

A demonstration of the ACD system led to Meyer Sound creating a subwoofer for film director Francis Ford Coppola’s use with the custom, quadraphonic sound system that toured with the original 70 mm release of Apocalypse Now. This was a forerunner for now-industry standard loudspeakers, using a dedicated processing unit to provide crossover, amplitude and phase correction, along with driver protection.

Also in 1979, the company developed the UM-1 UltraMonitor, which led to a long association with the band Grateful Dead. The UltraMonitor was the first product to employ a new, patented horn loudspeaker design that reduced distortion by a factor of ten compared to previous designs. This patent was the first of more than three dozen issued to the company since its founding. John Meyer was also involved in the development of the Grateful Dead's Wall of Sound.

In 1980, at the behest of Broadway sound designer Abe Jacob, Meyer Sound repackaged the technology of the UltraMonitor into the UPA-1. This loudspeaker had an immediate impact on theatrical sound, but was also notable for its introduction of the trapezoidal cabinet shape, which enabled the construction of curved arrays (flat-front arrays, in common use at the time, result in substantial destructive interference). A patent was issued for this innovation. The UPA-1 was an inaugural inductee into the TECnology Hall of Fame.

Meyer Sound pioneered high-level loudspeaker arrays with the release of the huge MSL-10 in 1981, followed by the MSL-3, a single cabinet (essentially a “slice” of an MSL-10) configurable into arrays of nearly any size.

Expanding on the appearance of real-time, dual FFT analyzers, Meyer Sound introduced source independent measurement (SIM) in 1984. SIM allowed sound system operators to use music itself as a test source for the first time, enabling continuous sound system correction over the course of a performance. SIM System II, the second generation of this technology (and the first version practical for widespread field use), won an R&D 100 Award (awarded for the 100 best engineering feats in any field worldwide) in 1992, in addition to the TEC award the original system received in 1986.

Meyer Sound introduced the HD-1 studio monitor, a fully integrated self-powered loudspeaker, in 1989. The HD-1 won at the TEC Awards in 1990 in the Transducer Technology category.

In 2005, Meyer Sound acquired LCS Audio and launched its LCS Series of digital audio products. The first new development by Meyer Sound of LCS technology was Constellation electroacoustic architecture, launched in 2006. Constellation is based on the VRAS (Variable Room Acoustic System) technology first developed and patented by Dr. Mark Poletti of Industrial Research Limited. An aspect of the Constellation system is that it uses an advanced, high-powered computer that calculates twenty thousand echoes per second. A Constellation system was installed in a rehearsal area at Davies Symphony Hall in San Francisco in late 2013, a facility that is used by the San Francisco Symphony and San Francisco Opera.

In 2008, the USITT presented Meyer Sound founders John and Helen Meyer with the Harold Burris-Meyer Distinguished Career in Sound Design Award. Also in that year, the John and Helen Meyer Scholarship was established in conjunction with the Escuela Superior Andaluza de Medios Audiovisuales (Superior School for AudioVisual Media) in Andalusia, Spain, and awarded to five students.

== Bibliography ==
- Jackson, Blair (2006). Grateful Dead Gear: The Band's Instruments, Sound Systems, and Recording Sessions from 1965 to 1995. Music Series. Backbeat Books. ISBN 978-0-87930-893-3.
