= List of awards and nominations received by Shirley MacLaine =

Shirley MacLaine awards and nominations
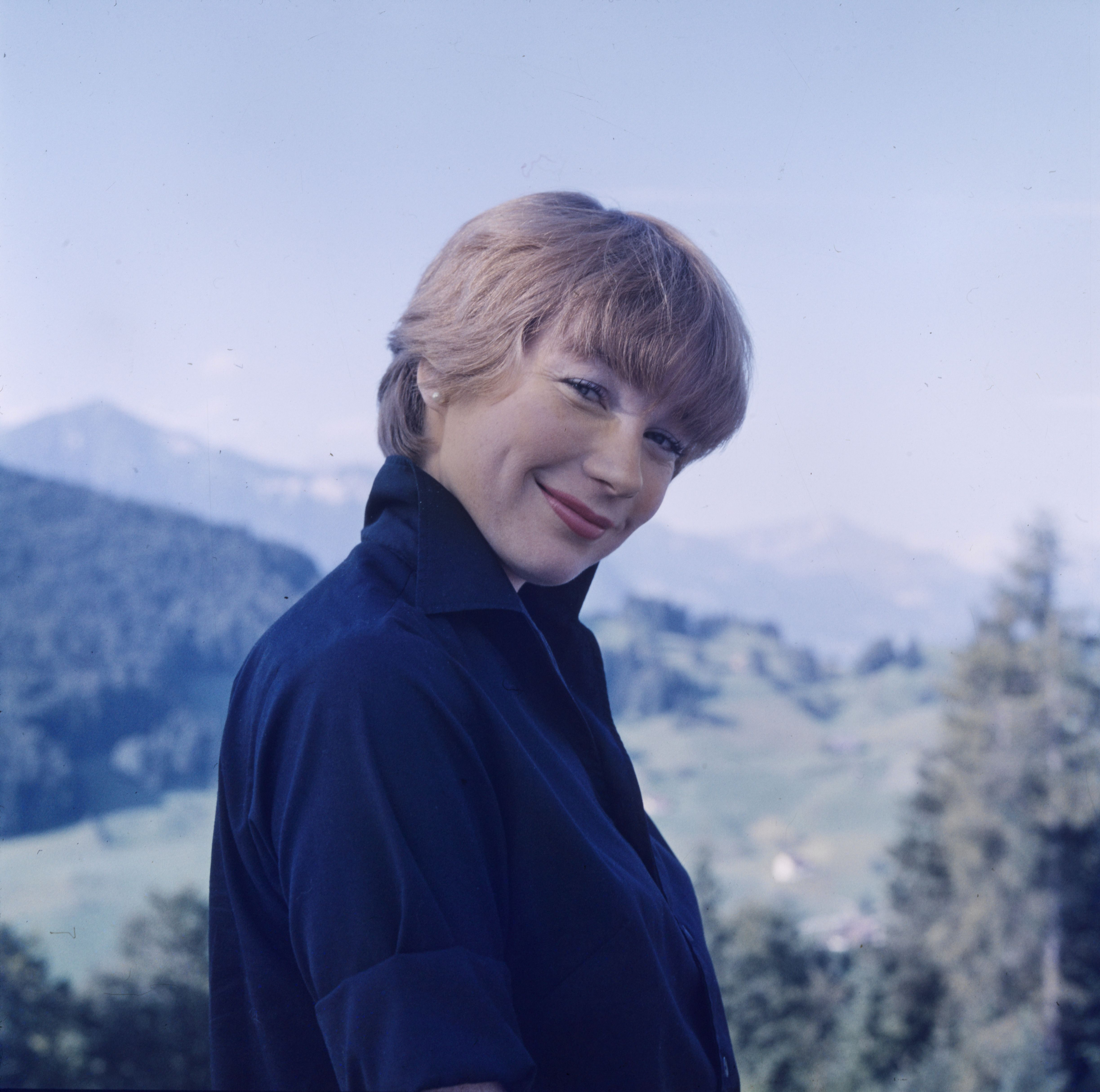
- MacLaine in 1960
Awards and nominations
Award	Wins	Nominations
Academy Awards	1	6
BAFTA Awards	2	8
Emmy Awards	1	6
Golden Globe Awards	6	20
Screen Actors Guild Awards	0	1

Totals (Note: Certain award groups do not simply award one winner. They acknowledge several different recipients, have runners-up, and have third place. Since this is a specific recognition and is different from losing an award, runner-up mentions are considered wins in this award tally. For simplification and to avoid errors, each award in this list has been presumed to have had a prior nomination.)
- Wins: 30
- Nominations: 69

Shirley MacLaine (born 1934) is an American actress. She is known for her work in film and television and is one of the last remaining stars of the Golden Age of Hollywood. She has received various accolades including an Academy Award, two British Academy Film Awards, a Primetime Emmy Award and six Golden Globe Awards as well as a nomination for a Screen Actors Guild Award.

She gained stardom for her role as lonely elevator girl in the Billy Wilder directed romantic drama The Apartment (1960) as well as Golden Globe Award for Best Actress in a Motion Picture – Musical or Comedy and the Volpi Cup for Best Actress as well as nominations for the Academy Award for Best Actress and the BAFTA Award for Best Actress in a Leading Role. She was further Oscar-nominated for Best Actress for her performances as the fun loving central character in the drama Some Came Running (1958), a prostitute in the romantic comedy Irma La Douce (1963), a ballerina in the drama The Turning Point (1977). For her portrayal of a difficult mother in the emotional family drama Terms of Endearment (1983) she won the Academy Award for Best Actress and the Golden Globe Award for Best Actress in a Motion Picture – Drama.

MacLaine's acting debut came with Alfred Hitchcock's The Trouble with Harry (1955) and followed by roles in Around the World in 80 Days (1956), Ocean's 11 (1960), The Children's Hour (1961), Sweet Charity (1969), Being There (1979), Madame Sousatzka (1988), Steel Magnolias (1989), Postcards from the Edge (1990), Used People (1992), Guarding Tess (1994), In Her Shoes (2005), Coco Chanel (2008), and Bernie (2011).

On television, she received the Primetime Emmy Award for Outstanding Variety Special for Gypsy in My Soul (1976). She was nominated for four other variety specials in that category. For her portrayal of the fashion designer Coco Chanel in the HBO film Coco Chanel (2008), she was also nominated for the Primetime Emmy Award for Outstanding Lead Actress in a Limited Series or Movie, the Golden Globe Award for Best Actress – Miniseries or Television Film, and the Screen Actors Guild Award for Outstanding Actress in a Miniseries or Television Movie.

Over her career she has received several honorary awards including a Motion Picture Star on the Hollywood Walk of Fame in 1960, the Film at Lincoln Center Gala Tribute in 1995, the Golden Globe Cecil B. DeMille Award in 1998, the Berlin International Film Festival's Honorary Golden Bear in 1999, the French Legion of Honor in 2001, the AFI Life Achievement Award in 2012, and the Kennedy Center Honors in 2013.

== Major associations ==
=== Academy Awards ===
Year	Category	Nominated work	Result	Ref.
1958	Best Actress	Some Came Running	Nominated	
1960	Best Actress	The Apartment	Nominated	
1963	Best Actress	Irma la Douce	Nominated	
1975	Best Documentary Feature	The Other Half of the Sky: A China Memoir	Nominated	
1977	Best Actress	The Turning Point	Nominated	
1983	Best Actress	Terms of Endearment	Won	

=== BAFTA Awards ===
Year	Category	Nominated work	Result	Ref.
British Academy Film Awards
1956	Best Foreign Actress	The Trouble with Harry	Nominated	
1959	Best Foreign Actress	Ask Any Girl	Won	
1960	Best Foreign Actress	The Apartment	Won	
1964	Best Foreign Actress	Irma la Douce / What a Way to Go!	Nominated	
1980	Best Actress in a Leading Role	Being There	Nominated	
1984	Best Actress in a Leading Role	Terms of Endearment	Nominated	
1990	Best Actress in a Leading Role	Postcards from the Edge	Nominated	
1990	Best Actress in a Supporting Role	Steel Magnolias	Nominated	

=== Golden Globe Awards ===
Year	Category	Nominated work	Result	Ref.
1954	New Star of the Year – Actress	The Trouble with Harry	Won	
1958	Best Actress in a Motion Picture – Drama	Some Came Running	Nominated	
1958	Special Achievement Award	—N/a	Won	
1959	Best Actress in a Motion Picture – Comedy or Musical	Ask Any Girl	Nominated	
1960	Best Actress in a Motion Picture – Comedy or Musical	The Apartment	Won	
1961	Best Actress in a Motion Picture – Drama	The Children's Hour	Nominated	
1963	Best Actress in a Motion Picture – Comedy or Musical	Irma la Douce	Won	
1966	Best Actress in a Motion Picture – Comedy or Musical	Gambit	Nominated	
1967	Best Actress in a Motion Picture – Comedy or Musical	Woman Times Seven	Nominated	
1969	Best Actress in a Motion Picture – Comedy or Musical	Sweet Charity	Nominated	
1979	Best Actress in a Motion Picture – Comedy or Musical	Being There	Nominated	
1983	Best Actress in a Motion Picture – Drama	Terms of Endearment	Won	
1987	Best Actress – Miniseries or Television Film	Out on a Limb	Nominated	
1988	Best Actress in a Motion Picture – Drama	Madame Sousatzka	Won	
1990	Best Supporting Actress – Motion Picture	Postcards from the Edge	Nominated	
1992	Best Actress in a Motion Picture – Comedy or Musical	Used People	Nominated	
1994	Best Actress in a Motion Picture – Comedy or Musical	Guarding Tess	Nominated	
1997	Cecil B. DeMille Award	—N/a	Honored	
2002	Best Actress – Miniseries or Television Film	Hell on Heels: The Battle of Mary Kay	Nominated	
2005	Best Supporting Actress – Motion Picture	In Her Shoes	Nominated	
2008	Best Actress – Miniseries or Television Film	Coco Chanel	Nominated	

=== Emmy Awards ===
Year	Category	Nominated work	Result	Ref.
Primetime Emmy Awards
1975	Outstanding Comedy-Variety, Variety or Music Special	Shirley MacLaine: If They Could See Me Now	Nominated	
1976	Outstanding Comedy-Variety, Variety or Music Special	Gypsy in My Soul	Won	
1977	Outstanding Comedy-Variety, Variety or Music Special	Shirley MacLaine: Where Do We Go from Here?	Nominated	
1979	Outstanding Comedy-Variety or Music Program	Shirley MacLaine at the Lido	Nominated	
1980	Outstanding Variety, Music or Comedy Program	Shirley MacLaine...'Every Little Movement'	Nominated	
2009	Outstanding Lead Actress in a Miniseries or Movie	Coco Chanel	Nominated	

=== Screen Actors Guild Awards ===
Year	Category	Nominated work	Result	Ref.
2008	Outstanding Performance by a Female Actor in a Miniseries or Television Movie	Coco Chanel	Nominated	

== Other awards and nominations ==
Organizations	Year	Category	Work	Result	Ref.
Berlin Film Festival	1959	Silver Bear for Best Actress	Ask Any Girl	Won	
Berlin Film Festival	1971	Silver Bear for Best Actress	Desperate Characters	Won	
Berlin Film Festival	1999	Honorary Golden Bear	—N/a	Honored	
Venice Film Festival	1960	Volpi Cup for Best Actress	The Apartment	Won	
Venice Film Festival	1988	Volpi Cup for Best Actress	Madame Sousatzka	Won	

== Honorary awards ==
Organizations	Year	Award	Result	Ref.
American Film Institute	2012	AFI Life Achievement Award	Honored	
Berlin International Film Festival	1999	Honorary Golden Bear	Honored	
Chicago Film Critics Association	2005	Career Achievement Award	Honored	
Elle Women in Hollywood	2005	Icon Award	Honored	
Elle Women in Hollywood	2012	Woman of the Year	Honored	
Film Society at Lincoln Center	1995	Chaplin Gala Tribute	Honored	
Golden Globe Awards	1998	Cecil B. DeMille Award	Honored	
Government of France	2001	Legion of Honor	Honored	
Hollywood Walk of Fame	1960	Motion Picture Star at 1617 Vine Street	Honored	
John F. Kennedy Center for the Performing Arts	2013	Kennedy Center Honors	Honored	
Palm Springs International Film Festival	2006	Lifetime Achievement Award	Honored	
Telluride Film Festival	1996	Silver Medallion Award	Honored	
