= Shirley MacLaine Live at the Palace =

Live album by Shirley MacLaine
- Released: 1976
- Recorded: August 19, 1976
- Venue: The Palace Theatre in New York City
- Genre: Cabaret, Show tunes
- Length: 50:46
- Label: Columbia; PC 34223
- Producer: Teo Macero

Shirley MacLaine chronology
| Sweet Charity (1969) | Shirley MacLaine Live at the Palace (1976) |

Professional ratings
Review scores
| Source | Rating |
|---|---|
| AllMusic | 3.5/5 stars |

Shirley MacLaine Live at the Palace is a 1976 live album by the actress and singer Shirley MacLaine recorded live at New York City's Palace Theatre. The show replicated the success MacLaine had with a similar series of concerts earlier in the year at the London Palladium.

The album was reissued on compact disc by DRG Records in April 2002, with new liner notes by Elton John. In the liner notes John wrote that "Seeing is believing and this lady captivated me. Every facet of her act was superb—singing, comedy, dancing and most of all warmth and complete mastery of her audience. The lady is quite simply a lesson in professionalism for any other performer".

The British entertainer Paul O'Grady described the album as his favourite in his 2011 memoir The Devil Rides Out.

== Track listing ==
1. "If My Friends Could See Me Now" (Cy Coleman, Dorothy Fields) – 5:38
2. "My Personal Property" (Coleman, Fields) – 1:53
3. "Remember Me?" (Al Dubin, Harry Warren) – 2:50
4. "Big Spender" (Coleman, Fields) – 2:48
5. "Irma La Douce" (Marguerite Monnot, Julian More, David Heneker, Monty Norman) – 4:29
6. "I'm a Person Too" (Robert Wells, Coleman) – 4:53
7. "The Gypsy in My Soul" (Clay Boland, Moe Jaffe) – 3:02
8. "It's Not Where You Start" (Coleman, Fields) – 3:26
9. "Every Little Movement (Has a Meaning All Its Own)" (Karl L. Hoschna, Otto Harbach) – 1:51
10. "The Donkey Serenade (Hustle)" (George Forrest, Rudolf Friml, Herbert Stothart) – 3:44
11. "She's a Star (La Chanteuse a Vingt Ans)" (Alice Donadel, Fred Ebb, Serge Lama) – 5:38
12. "I'm a Brass Band" (Coleman, Fields) – 4:47
13. "If My Friends Could See Me Now (Finale)" (Coleman, Fields) – 1:58

== Personnel ==
- Shirley MacLaine – vocals
- Shirley's Gypsies: Adam Grammis, Candy Brown, Gary Flannery, Jo Ann Lehmann, Larry Vickers – dancers
- Donn Trenner – musical director
- Tom Duckworth – drums
- Stan Tonkel – control engineer, remix engineer
- Elton John – liner notes (2002 reissue)
- Neal Preston – photography
- Cy Coleman, Teo Macero – producer
- Ted Brosnan, Tom Dwyer – recording engineers
- Hank Altman – recording supervisor
