= Joe Torre: Curveballs Along the Way =

- Genre: Biographical drama; Sports drama
- Written by: Philip Rosenberg
- Directed by: Sturla Gunnarsson
- Starring: Paul Sorvino; Robert Loggia; Barbara Williams; Isaiah Washington; Kenneth Welsh
- Music by: John Wellsman
- Country of origin: United States
- Original language: English

Production
- Executive producers: Bernard F. Conners; Thomas F. Leahy
- Producer: Norman Twain
- Cinematography: Mark Irwin
- Editor: Ronald Sanders
- Production companies: Showtime Networks; Hallmark Entertainment; British American Entertainment; Norman Twain Productions

Original release
- Network: Showtime
- Release: October 17, 1997

Joe Torre: Curveballs Along the Way is a 1997 American biographical drama television film chronicling Joe Torre's first year as manager of the New York Yankees when they won the 1996 World Series. It was directed by Sturla Gunnarsson, written by Philip Rosenberg, and stars Paul Sorvino as Torre. Robert Loggia, Barbara Williams, Isaiah Washington, and Kenneth Welsh also star. The film aired on October 17, 1997, on Showtime.

== Plot ==
During the 1996 Major League Baseball season, Joe Torre, manager of the New York Yankees, not only needs to concentrate on his team, but also the needs of his brother Frank, who is in need of a heart transplant, facing the same condition that already took the life of their other brother.

== Cast ==
- Paul Sorvino as Joe Torre
  - Anthony Romano as Young Joe
- Robert Loggia as Frank Torre
  - Trent McMullen as Young Frank
- Barbara Williams as Ali Torre
- Isaiah Washington as Dwight Gooden
- Gailard Sartain as Don Zimmer
- Barry Flatman as Mel Stottlemyre
- Marilyn Chris as Rae Torre
- Eugene A. Clark as Bob Watson
- Dean McDermott as David Cone
- Diego Fuentes as Mariano Duncan
- Aidan Devine as Wade Boggs
- Kenneth Welsh as George Steinbrenner
- Rummy Bishop as Rocco Torre
- Victoria Mitchell as Sister Marguerite
- Howard Dell as Darryl Strawberry
- Andrew Jackson as Paul O'Neill
- William Taylor as Reggie Jackson
- Diane Fabian as Buxom Neighbor
- Jimmy Leone, A. Frank Ruffo and Tony Perri as Neighbors
- Roz Michaels as Woman at Party
- Michael Rhoades, Frank Pellegrino, Demo Cates and Kathryn Winslow as Reporters
- Sandra O'Neill as Soot Zimmer
- Michael Filipowich and Rich Leitch as Ballplayers
- Ray Negron as Trainer
- James Kidnie as Al Post
- Matt Birman as Seattle Catcher
- Julie Paton as New Jersey Nurse
- Michael Fletcher as Opposing Manager and Ted Turner
- Walter Alza as Hector the Orderly
- Vivian Reis as Rose Torre
- Arlene Meadows as Anne Torre
- Darlene Mignacco as Joey's Mom
- Dick Callahan as Ticket Guy
- Marvin Ishmael as Doctor
- Will Corno as Michael Torre
- Christine Donato as Tina Torre
- Vito Marchese as Kid Ballplayer
- Matthew Morris as Program Vendor
- Robert Collins as Frank Cashen
- Wayne Robert McNamara as Young Tycoon

== Production ==
Filming took place in Toronto and New York City.

== See also ==
- List of baseball films
