= Lee Wallace (actor) =

American actor (1930–2020)

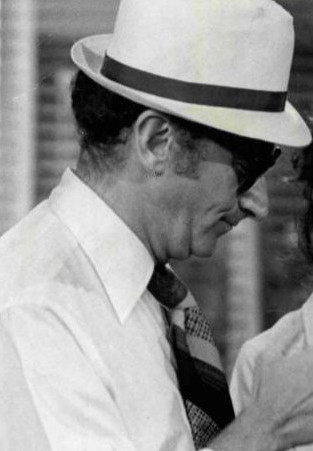
- Wallace in Alice (1977)
- Born: Leo Melis; July 15, 1930; Brooklyn, New York, U.S.
- Died: December 20, 2020 (aged 90); New York City, U.S.
- Occupation: Actor
- Years active: 1966–2005
- Spouse: Marilyn Chris (m. 1975)

Lee Wallace (born Leo Melis; July 15, 1930 – December 20, 2020) was an American actor.

== Early life ==
Wallace was born as Leo Melis on July 15, 1930, in Brooklyn, New York, the son of Celia (née Gross) and Eddie Melis.

== Career ==
His movie roles include more than a dozen productions big and small, including Klute (1971), The Hot Rock (1972), The Taking of Pelham One Two Three (1974) as the Mayor of New York City, The Happy Hooker (1975), Diary of the Dead (1976), Thieves (1977), Private Benjamin (1980) as Mr. Waxman, World War III (1982), Daniel (1983), Batman (1989) as Gotham City's Mayor Borg, and Used People (1992). John Simon in his review of Batman called Wallace "a perfect Ed Koch lookalike".

On Broadway, he appeared in A Teaspoon Every Four Hours, Unlikely Heroes, The Secret Affairs of Mildred Wild, Molly, Zalmen or The Madness of God, Some of My Best Friends, Grind and The Cemetery Club.

== Personal life ==
As of 2016, Wallace lived in New York City with his wife Marilyn Chris until his death on December 20, 2020.

== Filmography ==
=== Film ===
Lee Wallace film credits
Year	Title	Role
1971	Klute	Nate Goldfarb (uncredited)
1972	The Hot Rock	Dr. Strauss
1974	The Taking of Pelham One Two Three	Al – the Mayor of New York City
1975	The Happy Hooker	Henry Knowlton
1976	Diary of the Dead	Lt. Gart
1977	Thieves	Harry
1980	Private Benjamin	Mr. Waxman
1983	Daniel	The Mayor
1985	War and Love	Oskar Kohn
1989	Batman	Mayor Borg
1992	Used People	Uncle Harry

=== Television ===
Lee Wallace television credits
Year	Title	Role	Notes
1977	Kojak	Hobart	1 episode
1977	Lou Grant	Mr. Kelso	Episode: "Nazi"
1978	The Eddie Capra Mysteries	Mortimer	Episode: "And the Sea Shall Give Up Her Dead"
1980	The Associates	Gerald McMartin	Episode: "The Censors"
1980	This Year's Blonde	Samuel Goldwyn	TV movie
1982	World War II	Dr. Jules Farber	TV miniseries
1986	The Equalizer	Whitney	Episode: "Unpunished Crimes"
1987	Kojak: The Price of Justice	Chief of Operations	TV movie
1992	Law & Order	Judge Thomas Simon	Episode: "Intolerance"
