= Strike Force (1975 film) =

- Genre: Crime; Drama; Thriller
- Written by: Sonny Grosso; Roger O. Hirson
- Directed by: Barry Shear
- Starring: Cliff Gorman; Richard Gere; Don Blakely; Joe Spinell
- Music by: John Murtaugh
- Country of origin: United States
- Original language: English

Production
- Producers: Philip D'Antoni; Barry J. Weitz
- Production location: New York City
- Cinematography: Jack Priestley
- Editor: Murray Solomon
- Running time: 73 minutes
- Production company: D'Antoni-Weitz Television Productions

Original release
- Network: NBC
- Release: April 12, 1975

Strike Force is a 1975 television film directed by Barry Shear and starring Richard Gere.

== Premise ==
A federal agent and a New York City detective join forces with state trooper to break up a drug ring. Inspired by the real-life theft of the narcotics held in evidence of the French Connection case, discovered missing from the NYPD Property clerk's office in 1972.

== Cast ==
- Richard Gere as Trooper Walter Spenser
- Cliff Gorman as Detective Joey Gentry
- Don Blakely as FBI Agent Jerome Ripley
- Allan Rich as Police Commissioner
- Joe Spinell as Sol Terranova
- Edward Grover as Captain Peterson
- Marilyn Chris as Faye Stone
- Marie Puma as Policewoman
- Lenny Montana as Italian dockworker
