= Loving Couples (1980 film) =

1980 film by Jack Smight

- Theatrical release poster
- Directed by: Jack Smight
- Written by: Martin Donovan
- Produced by: David Susskind
- Starring: Shirley MacLaine; James Coburn; Susan Sarandon; Stephen Collins
- Cinematography: Philip H. Lathrop
- Edited by: Frank J. Urioste
- Music by: Fred Karlin
- Production company: Time-Life Films
- Distributed by: 20th Century Fox
- Release date: October 24, 1980
- Running time: 97 minutes
- Country: United States
- Language: English
- Box office: $2.8 million (US and Canada)

Loving Couples is a 1980 American romantic comedy film written by Martin Donovan and directed by Jack Smight. It stars Shirley MacLaine, James Coburn, Susan Sarandon, and Stephen Collins.

== Synopsis ==
The plot offers a comic spin on adultery. When Greg crashes his sports car, doctor Evelyn comes to his rescue, and the two soon are engaged in an affair. Evelyn's workaholic husband learns about it from Greg's live-in girlfriend, scatterbrained television weather girl Stephanie, and the two begin to engage in a dalliance of their own. Complications arise when the two couples plan a clandestine weekend getaway at the same Acapulco resort.

== Cast ==
- Shirley MacLaine as Dr. Evelyn Lucas Kirby
- James Coburn as Dr. Walter Kirby
- Susan Sarandon as Stephanie Beck
- Stephen Collins as Greg Plunkett
- Sally Kellerman as Mrs. Liggett
- Nan Martin as Walter's Nurse
- Anne Bloom as Nurse
- Helena Carroll as Prudence
- Marilyn Chris as Sally
- Pat Corley as Delmonico Clerk
- Michael Currie as Ken
- John de Lancie as Alan
- Peter Hobbs as Frank
- Sam Weisman as Cop
- Bernard Behrens as Elegant Doctor

== Production ==
The scenes in Mexico actually were shot at the Hotel del Coronado in San Diego, California, and the hotel interiors were filmed at the Ambassador Hotel on Wilshire Boulevard in Los Angeles.

Together with A Change of Seasons, the film was one of two 1980s 20th Century Fox's releases starring Shirley MacLaine that dealt with the subject of marital infidelity. Regarding the similarity between the former and his appreciation for Loving Couples, Coburn said: "It was a change of pace. It was a comedy. I thought it was pretty good, but here was another film out around the same time with Shirley MacLaine called A Change of Seasons. You know, that film was a lot like Loving Couples. It was almost the same fuckin’ story. Shirley played the same kind of character. I don't know why”. It was one of Coburn's last leading roles.

== Soundtrack ==
A soundtrack to the film was released on Motown Records, featuring new music from the Temptations, Syreeta, and Billy Preston. Also featured is the song "Bass Odyssey" by Jermaine Jackson from his 1976 album My Name Is Jermaine.

=== Side one ===
1. "Take Me Away" (the Temptations) (written by Fred Karlin and Dean Pitchford)
2. "And So It Begins" (Instrumental Version) (written by Fred Karlin)
3. "Turn Up the Music" (Syreeta) (written by Fred Karlin and Dean Pitchford)
4. "I'll Make It with Your Love" (Billy Preston) (written by Fred Karlin and Norman Gimbel)

=== Side two ===
1. "And So It Begins" (Syreeta) (written by Fred Karlin and Norman Gimbel)
2. "I'll Make It with Your Love" (Instrumental Version) (written by Fred Karlin)
3. "There's More Where That Came From" (the Temptations) (written by Fred Karlin and Dean Pitchford)
4. "Bass Odyssey" (Jermaine Jackson) (written by Greg Wright)

All songs were produced by Teddy Randazzo, except for "Bass Odyssey" which was produced by Greg Wright. Also, Karlin himself produced the instrumental versions of "And So It Begins" and "I'll Make It with Your Love".

== Critical reception ==
In her review in The New York Times, Janet Maslin called the film "a flat, lifeless movie . . . about as uneventful and unromantic as a romantic comedy can be" and added, "it never creates the impression that any of the lovers much care about one another, or even that they're people at all."

Roger Ebert of the Chicago Sun-Times called it "a dumb remake of a very old idea that has been done so much better so many times before, that this version is wretchedly unnecessary . . . the whole project smells like high-gloss sitcom."

Variety opined, "Direction by Jack Smight is assured and never lags. MacLaine is in top form, sassy and sweet in turn. Coburn delivers a casually effective light comedy performance. Sarandon is topnotch."

Time Out New York says it "subscribes to conventions as old as the hills and twice as rocky, burying any hints of feminist awareness beneath the routines of macho courtship. Faced with direction paced at a lethargic crawl and dialogue of inconceivable banality, the cast respond with performances of glazed charm."
