= Claudia Weill =

American film director

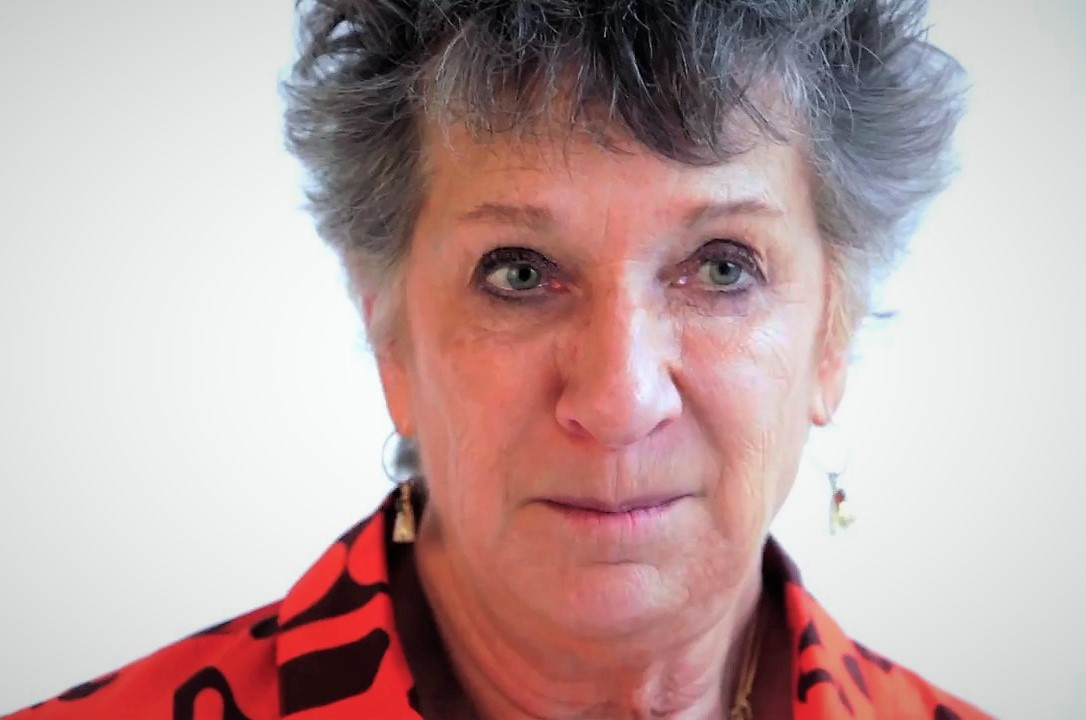
- Weill in 2015
- Born: 1947 (age 78–79); New York City, New York, U.S.
- Education: Harvard University
- Occupations: Film, television and theatre director, film instructor
- Spouse: Walter S. Teller
- Children: 2

Claudia Weill is an American film director best known for her film Girlfriends (1978), starring Melanie Mayron, Christopher Guest, Bob Balaban and Eli Wallach, made independently and sold to Warner Brothers after multiple awards at Cannes, Filmex and Sundance. Girlfriends would be one of 82 films made by a female director to compete at Cannes. In 2019, Girlfriends was selected by the Library of Congress for preservation in the National Film Registry for being "culturally, historically, or aesthetically significant".

It's My Turn (1980 for Columbia Pictures)—with Jill Clayburgh, Michael Douglas, and Charles Grodin—won her the Donatello, or International Oscar for best new director.

Earlier work includes 30 films for Sesame Street, freelancing as a camerawoman, and numerous documentaries, notably The Other Half of the Sky: A China Memoir, a documentary about the first women's delegation to China in 1973, headed by Shirley MacLaine, nominated for an Academy Award and released theatrically and on PBS.

== Early life and education ==
In 1947, Weill was born in New York City. Weill's family was Jewish. In 1969, Weill graduated from Harvard University.

== Career ==
Weill moved to Los Angeles in 1986. Weill began directing TV episodes of The Twilight Zone, Thirtysomething, My So-Called Life, Once and Again, Chicago Hope, and numerous pilots. More recently, she directed an episode of Girls for HBO.

As a theater director (Williamstown, The O’Neill, Sundance, ACT, Empty Space and in New York at MTC, the Public, and Circle Rep), she won the Drama Desk's Best Director Award for the premiere of Donald Margulies’ Found a Peanut produced by Joe Papp at the Public Theater in 1984.

She directed The Belle of Belfast by Nate Rufus Edelman at EST and the Irish Repertory Theatre in New York, Twelfth Night for Antaeus, the West Coast Premiere of Pulitzer Prize winner Doubt by John Patrick Shanley (with Linda Hunt) at the Pasadena Playhouse, Memory House, End Days, Tape, numerous workshops of Modern Orthodox, Adam Baum and the Jew Movie (Goldfarb), The Parents' Evening by Bathsheba Doran at the Vineyard Playhouse, and Huck and Holden by Rajiv Joseph at the Black Dahlia, among others.

In 1979, the Supersisters trading card set was produced and distributed; one of the cards featured Weill's name and picture.

After selling Girlfriends to Warner Brothers, Columbia Pictures hired Weill to direct 1980's film It's My Turn. Weill was the female boss of an all male crew. It was during this time that Weill experienced sexism and sexual harassment from producer Ray Stark. He also interfered with her vision of the film. Due to this she directed no more feature films.

Weill has taught directing for film, television and/or theater, as well as Directing for Writers at Harvard, Juilliard, Cal Arts, USC Graduate School of Cinema Studies, Columbia, The New School and Sarah Lawrence College. She mentors playwrights and directors.

She has served as a juror with Elvis Mitchell for the Nashville Film Festival and directed several of the Game Changers films for the Directors Guild of America 75th Anniversary. Weill serves on the Directors' Executive Committee for the Academy of Motion Picture Arts and Sciences. She is the third woman to be admitted into the committee as a director in 1980 after Dorothy Arzner and Ida Lupino.

== Filmography ==
=== Films ===
This is a partial list of films credited as director:

- 1970 This Is the Home of Mrs. Levant Graham
- 1975 The Other Half of the Sky: A China Memoir
- 1978 Girlfriends
- 1980 It's My Turn
- 1986 Johnny Bull (TV movie)
- 1988 Giving Up the Ghost (TV movie)
- 1991 Face of a Stranger (TV movie)
- 1992 A Child Lost Forever (TV movie)
- 1996 Critical Choices (TV movie)
- 2013 He's Way More Famous Than You as herself

== Personal life ==
In 1985, Weill married Walter S. Teller. They have two sons, Sam Teller and Eli Teller.
