= Marilyn Chris =

American actress

- Born: Marilyn Miller; 1938 or 1939 (age 87–88); Brooklyn, New York, U.S.
- Other name: Marilyn Chris-Wallace
- Occupation: Actress
- Years active: 1960–present
- Spouses: George Christopoulos (m. 1957, divorced); Ric Mancini (m. 1967, divorced); Lee Wallace (m. 1975; died 2020)
- Children: 1

Marilyn Chris (born Marilyn Miller, 1938 or 1939 (Note: Two reference works concerning the history of daytime TV—each of whose Marilyn Chris entries includes a birthday without specifying the year—diverge widely as to the month and day of her birth. The Soap Opera Book : Who's Who in Daytime Drama, published in 1992 by Todd Publications, lists May 19 as her birthday, whereas Daytime TV Star's Directory, published by Popular Library in 1976, has September 24.)) is an American actress. She is known for playing the role of Wanda Webb Wolek on the ABC soap opera, One Life to Live (1972–1976, 1980–1994). She starred Off-Broadway in Allen Ginsberg's Kaddish (1972), winning an Obie Award, an Outer Critics Circle Award, a Variety Critics Poll, and a Drama Desk Award for her performance. In the 1980s, she appeared on Broadway in Brighton Beach Memoirs.

== Early life ==
Chris was born in Brooklyn, New York, to Jack Miller, an English-Scottish Mennonite and Sylvia Slavin, a Russian Jew. When she was growing up, her father walked out on the family and her grandfather, who she was close with, died.

She attended Junior High School 109 in Brooklyn. One of her classmates was Steve Lawrence (when he was still known as Sidney Liebowitz). Chris was then accepted at the High School of Performing Arts. After high school, she enrolled at City College of New York.

== Career ==
On February 23, 1958, the New York Daily News chose Chris as that week's "Typical American Girl." Her photo appeared in the Sunday magazine section and she won a $25 prize. She began her acting career in the 1950s at The Living Theatre. She appeared in productions for the theatre, including Many Loves, Women of Trachis, In the Jungle of Cities, The Apple, and Man is Man. Prompted by the discovery that her birth name was already registered with Actors Equity, Miller devised a stage name simply by shortening her then-married name, Christopoulos.

In 1963, she appeared in The Good Soldier Schweik for the Chelsea Theater Center. She made her film debut in Love with the Proper Stranger (1963), co-starring with Natalie Wood and Steve McQueen. In 1965, Chris was an under study for the roles of Agnes Graham and Sylvia Goldman in the original Broadway production of The Family Way. In 1967, she was a stand by for the roles of Lulu and Meg in The Birthday Party on Broadway. In 1968, she was a stand by for the title role in a Broadway production of The Seven Descents of Myrtle.

Chris appeared in the romantic drama film John and Mary (1969), co-starring with Dustin Hoffman. In 1970, she guest starred on Hawaii Five-O. The same year, she played Myrtle Young in the crime film The Honeymoon Killers. She also had a role in the drama film The People Next Door. Chris appeared on Broadway in Lenny.

In 1972, Chris briefly played the role of Edie Hoffman on the ABC soap opera All My Children. She was cast as Naomi, the paranoid mother of Allen Ginsberg in Kaddish. The play opened at the Brooklyn Academy of Music in February 1972. Chris won an Obie Award for her performance. She also won a Drama Desk Award, an Outer Critics Circle Award and a Variety Critics Poll.

In May 1972, she was cast in the contract role of Wanda Webb on the ABC soap opera One Life to Live. The character opened a restaurant called Heavenly Hash in the fictional city of Llanview. Her true love was Vince Wolek (Antony Ponzini).

Chris played Mrs. Bingham in the comedy film Rhinoceros (1974), co-starring with Gene Wilder. In July 1974, she co-starred with Lee Wallace in the musical Laugh a Little, Cry a Little at the Westbury Music Fair. She played Faye Stone in the television film Strike Force (1975), co-starring with Richard Gere. In 1976, Chris left her role on One Life to Live.

She starred as Rose Lander in the film Looking Up (1977). Chris guest starred on Rafferty and Barney Miller. She played Harriet in the television film Some Kind of Miracle (1979). The same year, she appeared in the television miniseries Backstairs at the White House. She made guest appearances on Family and Kaz.

Chris played Mavis Skinner in the comedy film The Black Marble (1980). The same year, she also appeared in the romantic comedy film Loving Couples. She had a role in the television film The Secret War of Jackie's Girls. In 1980, Chris returned to the role of Wanda on One Life to Live. She appeared in the television film Kent State (1981).

In the early 1980s, Chris returned to Broadway, playing Kate Jerome in Brighton Beach Memoirs. She co-starred with her husband, Lee Wallace, in the television film A Doctor's Story (1984). She guest starred on Fame in 1986. Chris appeared in the film American Stories: Food, Family and Philosophy (also titled Histoires d'Amerique) (1989). In 1990, she co-starred with Lee Wallace in Taking Stock for the Jewish Repertory Theatre.

In March and April 1992, Chris appeared in Barefoot in the Park at the Valley Forge Music Fair. She co-starred with Bernard Barrow, Cady McClain, and Walt Willey. In October 1992, she co-starred with Lee Wallace in God of Vengeance for the Jewish Repertory Theatre. Soap Opera Digest reported in January 1994 that Chris would be leaving her role on One Life to Live. Her final air date was February 7, 1994.

In the 1990s, she made guest appearances on Law & Order. She also guest starred on New York News. Chris played Josie Basilio in Trees Lounge (1996). She co-starred with Steve Buscemi, who also wrote and directed the film. In 1997, she appeared in the television film Joe Torre: Curveballs Along the Way. The same year, she also had a role in the film The Deli. In May 1997, Chris played Faye in The Young Girl and the Monsoon at Playwrights Horizons.

Chris guest starred on Third Watch in 1999. She guest starred on Deadline and Oz in the early 2000s. She played Phyllis in The Great New Wonderful (2005), a comedy film about New Yorkers living in the city after the September 11 attacks. She appeared as Mrs. Chadwick in the comedy film Waltzing Anna (2006). Chris guest starred on Law & Order: Special Victims Unit and Law & Order: Criminal Intent.

In March 2010, she appeared in Sin at the Baruch Performing Arts Center's Rose Nagelberg Theatre. The play closed abruptly due to lack of funds. She played Elizabeth Robbins in the suspense film Altered Minds (2013). In July 2024, Chris played serial killer Nannie Doss in a solo reading of The Giggling Granny at the Southampton Cultural Center.

== Personal life ==
Chris has married three times, the first two ending in divorce: first, in 1957, to aspiring playwright George Christopoulos, with whom she had a son; next, on New Year's Eve 1967, to actor Ric Mancini; and finally—from December 14, 1975 until his death on December 20, 2020—to actor Lee Wallace.

== Filmography ==
=== Film ===
Year	Title	Role	Notes
1963	Love with the Proper Stranger	Gina	
1969	John and Mary	The Film Director's Wife	
1970	The Honeymoon Killers	Myrtle Young	
1970	The People Next Door	Discotheque Waitress	
1974	Rhinoceros	Mrs. Bingham	
1976	Love in the Hamptons	Mother	Video
1977	Looking Up	Rose Lander	
1980	The Black Marble	Mavis Skinner	
1980	Loving Couples	Sally	
1989	American Stories: Food, Family and Philosophy		
1996	Trees Lounge	Josie Basilio	
1997	The Deli	Rosie	Credited as Marilyn Cris
2000	The Bookie's Lament	Carmel	Short film
2005	The Great New Wonderful	Phyllis	
2005	Lucky	Ruth	Short film
2006	Waltzing Anna	Mrs. Chadwick	
2009	Comfortable Distance	Helen	Short film
2013	Altered Minds	Elizabeth Robbins	

=== Television ===
Year	Title	Role	Notes
1968	N.Y.P.D.	Mrs. Baxter; The Second Girl	Episodes: "Last Port of Call," "The Love Hustle"
1970	Hawaii Five-O	Dorothy Owens	Episode: "Paniolo"
1971	Dan August	Waitress	Episode: "The Worst Crime"
1972	All My Children	Edie Hoffman	
1972–1976, 1980–1994	One Life to Live	Wanda Webb Wolek	Contract role
1975	Strike Force	Faye Stone	Television film
1977	Rafferty	Callie	Episode: "The Wild Child"
1978	Barney Miller	Ruth Whittney	Episode: "The Harris Incident"
1979	Some Kind of Miracle	Harriet	Television film
1979	Family	Miss Grey	Episode: "Moment of Truth"
1979	Kaz		Episode: "The Stalking Man"
1979	Backstairs at the White House	Diane Clare	Television miniseries, 1 episode
1980	The Secret War of Jackie's Girls	Mabel	Television film
1981	Kent State	Mrs. Scheuer	Television film
1984	A Doctor's Story	Anne Wickes	Television film
1986	Fame	Sylvia	Episode: "A Different Drummer"
1994; 1995; 1998	Law & Order	Mary Perella; Mrs. Capetti; Gayatri Devi	Episodes: "White Rabbit," "Bitter Fruit," "DWB"
1995	New York News		Episode: "Past Imperfect"
1997	Joe Torre: Curveballs Along the Way	Rae Torre	Television film
1999	Third Watch	Rena	Episode: "Modern Designs for Better Living"
2001	Deadline	Rona Friedman	Episode: "The First Commandment"
2003	Oz	Oppenheimer	Episode: "Exeunt Omnes"
2006	Law & Order: Special Victims Unit	Dora Hovis	Episode: "Cage"
2009	Law & Order: Criminal Intent		Episode: "Family Values"

== Awards and nominations ==
Year	Award	Category	Title	Result	Ref.
1972	Obie Award	Distinguished Performance	Kaddish	Won	
1972	Outer Critics Circle Award	Outstanding Actress in a Play	Kaddish	Won	
1972	Drama Desk Award	Outstanding Performance	Kaddish	Won	
1972	Variety Critics Poll		Kaddish	Won	

== Sources ==
- Chelsea on the Edge: The Adventures of an American Theater, Davi Napoleon. Includes discussion of Robert Kalfin's off-Broadway multi-media production of Kaddish.Iowa State University Press. ISBN 0-8138-1713-7, 1991.
