= Shirley MacLaine =

American actress and author (born 1934)

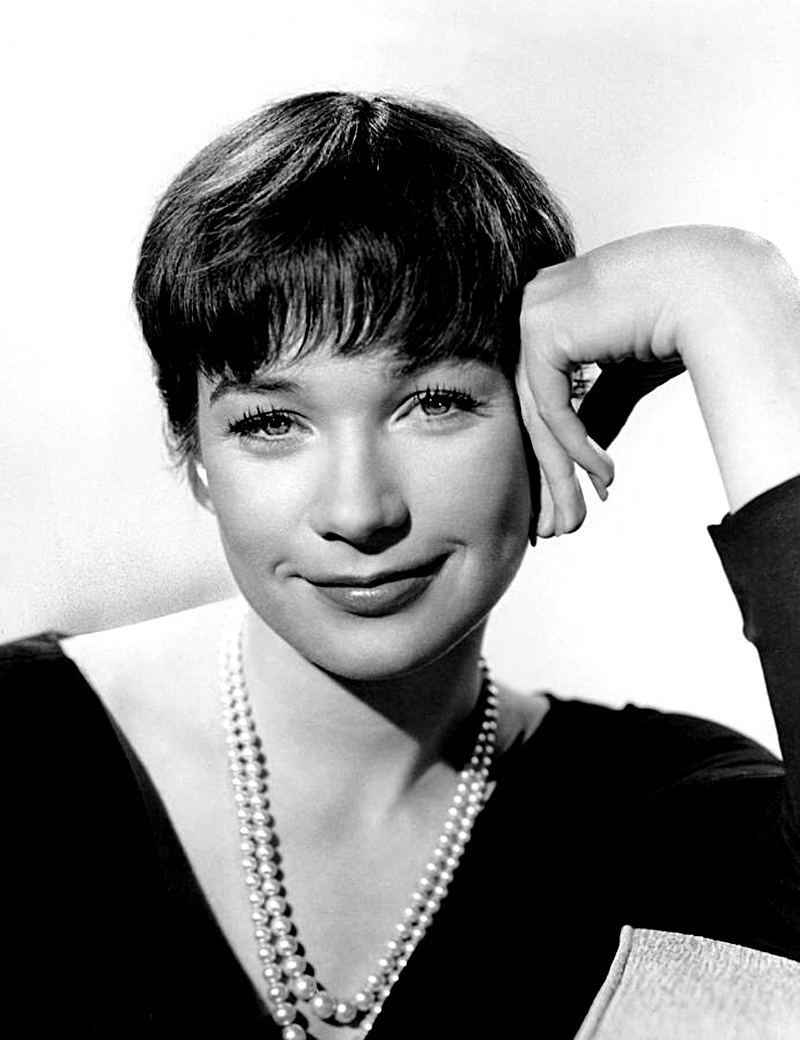
- MacLaine in 1960
- Born: Shirley MacLean Beaty; April 24, 1934 (age 92); Richmond, Virginia, U.S.
- Occupations: Actress; author; activist; dancer; singer
- Years active: 1953–present
- Spouse: Steve Parker (m. 1954; div. 1982)
- Children: Sachi Parker
- Relatives: Warren Beatty (brother); Ella Beatty (niece); Annette Bening (sister-in-law)
- Awards: Full list
- Website: shirleymaclaine.com

Shirley MacLaine (born Shirley MacLean Beaty; April 24, 1934) is an American actress and author. With a career spanning over 70 years, she has received numerous accolades, including an Academy Award, an Emmy Award, two BAFTA Awards, six Golden Globe Awards, two Volpi Cups, and two Silver Bears. She has been honored with the Film Society of Lincoln Center Tribute in 1995, the Cecil B. DeMille Award in 1998, the AFI Life Achievement Award in 2012, and the Kennedy Center Honor in 2014. MacLaine is one of the last remaining stars from the Golden Age of Hollywood.

Born in Richmond, Virginia, MacLaine made her acting debut as a teenager with minor roles in the Broadway musicals Me and Juliet and The Pajama Game. MacLaine's career began during the final years of the Golden Age of Hollywood where she made her film debut with Alfred Hitchcock's black comedy The Trouble with Harry (1955), winning the Golden Globe Award for New Star of the Year – Actress. She rose to prominence with starring roles in Around the World in 80 Days (1956), Some Came Running (1958), Ask Any Girl (1959), The Apartment (1960), The Children's Hour (1961), Irma la Douce (1963), and Sweet Charity (1969).

A six-time Academy Award nominee, MacLaine won the Academy Award for Best Actress for the comedy-drama Terms of Endearment (1983). Her other prominent films include The Turning Point (1977), Being There (1979), Madame Sousatzka (1988), Steel Magnolias (1989), Postcards from the Edge (1990), In Her Shoes (2005), Bernie (2011), The Secret Life of Walter Mitty (2013), Elsa & Fred (2014), and Noelle (2019).

MacLaine starred in the sitcom Shirley's World (1971–1972) and played the eponymous fashion designer in the biopic television film Coco Chanel (2008), receiving nominations for a Primetime Emmy Award, a Screen Actors Guild Award, and a Golden Globe Award for the latter. She also made appearances in several television series, including Downton Abbey (2012–2013), Glee (2014), and Only Murders in the Building (2022). MacLaine has written many books regarding the subjects of metaphysics, spirituality, and reincarnation, as well as a best-selling memoir, Out on a Limb (1983).

== Early life and education ==
Named after child actress Shirley Temple, who was six years old at the time, Shirley MacLean Beaty was born on April 24, 1934, in Richmond, Virginia. Her father, Ira Owens Beaty, was a professor of psychology, a public school administrator, and a real estate agent. Her Canadian mother, Kathlyn Corinne (née MacLean), was a drama teacher from Wolfville, Nova Scotia. MacLaine's younger brother is filmmaker Warren Beatty, who changed the spelling of his surname for his career. Both were raised by their parents as Baptists. Her mother's brother-in-law was A. A. MacLeod, a member of the Ontario provincial legislature for the Communist Party in the 1940s.

While MacLaine was still a child, Ira Beaty moved the family from Richmond to Norfolk, Virginia, and then to Arlington, then to Waverly, and finally back to Arlington—where he worked at Thomas Jefferson Junior High School in Arlington—in 1945.

As a toddler, she had weak ankles and fell over with the slightest misstep, so her mother enrolled her in ballet class at the Washington School of Ballet at the age of three. This was the beginning of her interest in performing. Strongly motivated by ballet, she never missed a class. In classical romantic pieces such as Romeo and Juliet and The Sleeping Beauty, she always played the boys' roles because she was the tallest in the groups of girls. MacLaine eventually was cast in a substantial female role as the fairy godmother in Cinderella and, while warming up backstage, broke her ankle. She tightened the ribbons on her pointe shoes and completed the entire performance before calling for an ambulance.

Ultimately, MacLaine decided against making a career of professional ballet because she had grown too tall and felt unable to perfect her technique. She explained that hers was unlike the ideal body type, lacking the requisite "beautifully constructed feet" of high arches, high insteps, and a flexible ankle. She moved on to other forms of dancing as well as acting and musical theater.

MacLaine played baseball on a boys' team and held the record for the most home runs, earning her the nickname "Powerhouse." During the 1950s, the family resided in the Dominion Hills section of Arlington.

MacLaine attended Washington-Lee High School in Arlington, Virginia, where she was on the cheerleading squad and acted in school theatrical productions.

== Career ==
The summer before her senior year of high school in Arlington, Virginia, MacLaine went to New York City to try acting and had minor success in the chorus of a production of Oklahoma! that toured the subway circuit. After graduation, she returned and made her Broadway debut dancing in the ensemble of the Broadway production of Me and Juliet (1953–1954). Afterwards she became an understudy to actress Carol Haney in The Pajama Game. In May 1954, Haney injured her ankle during a Wednesday matinee, and MacLaine performed in her place. A few months later, with Haney still injured, Jerry Lewis saw a matinee and urged film producer Hal B. Wallis to attend the evening performance with him, hoping to cast her in Artists and Models. Wallis signed her to work for Paramount Pictures.

=== 1955–1959: Career beginnings and success ===
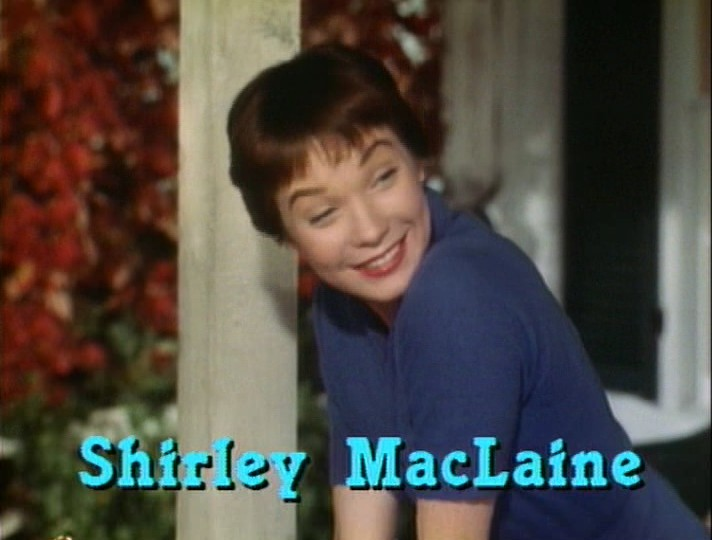
MacLaine in her debut film The Trouble with Harry (1955)

MacLaine began her career and quickly rose to fame during the final years of the Golden Age of Hollywood when she made her film debut in Alfred Hitchcock's The Trouble with Harry (1955), for which she won the Golden Globe Award for New Star of the Year – Actress.

The Trouble with Harry was quickly followed by her role in the Martin and Lewis film Artists and Models (also 1955). Soon afterwards, she had the female lead in Around the World in 80 Days (1956), which won the Academy Award for Best Picture. This was followed by Hot Spell, The Sheepman, and The Matchmaker (1958), all released in 1958.

MacLaine played Ginny Moorehead, who falls in love with Frank Sinatra's character, Dave, in Vincente Minnelli's adaptation of James Jones' novel Some Came Running, in the 1958 film of the same name. The film saw her co-starring with Dean Martin for the second time. For her role as Ginny Moorehead, she earned positive reviews and received her first nominations for the Academy Award for Best Actress and the Golden Globe Award for Best Actress in a Motion Picture – Drama. She appeared with Dean Martin in Career (1959), the third of their several films.

=== 1960–1969: Acclaim and stardom ===
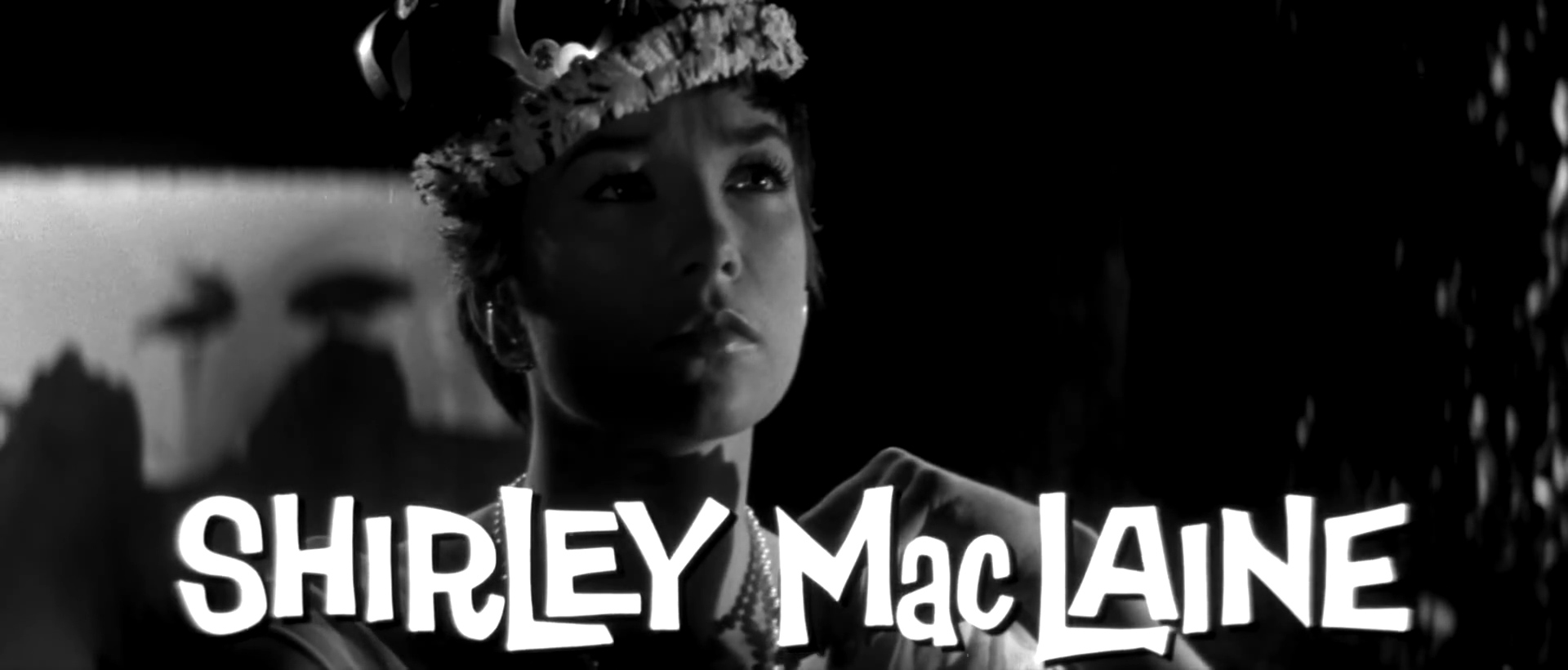
MacLaine in the trailer for The Apartment (1960)

MacLaine appeared with Frank Sinatra in 1960's Can-Can, then made a cameo appearance in the Rat Pack movie Ocean's 11 (1960). MacLaine would become an honorary member of the Rat Pack.

In 1960, MacLaine starred in Billy Wilder's romantic drama The Apartment (1960). The film is set on the Upper West Side of Manhattan and follows an insurance clerk, C.C. Baxter (Jack Lemmon), who allows his co-workers to use his apartment for their extramarital affairs. He is attracted to the insurance company's elevator operator (MacLaine), who is already having an affair with Baxter's boss (Fred MacMurray). The film received widespread critical acclaim and emerged as a major commercial success at the box-office. It received ten Academy Award nominations, winning Best Picture, Best Director, Best Original Screenplay, Best Art Direction (Black and White) and Best Film Editing.

MacLaine's performance in the film earned her a second nomination for the Academy Award for Best Actress. Despite being highly favored to win, she lost the award to Elizabeth Taylor for BUtterfield 8. She won the Volpi Cup for Best Actress, the BAFTA Award for Best Actress in a Leading Role and the Golden Globe Award for Best Actress – Motion Picture Comedy or Musical. The Apartment was included by Roger Ebert in his 2001 Great Movies list. Charlize Theron, speaking at the 89th Academy Awards, praised MacLaine's performance as "raw, real, and funny", and as making "this black and white movie feel like it's in color".

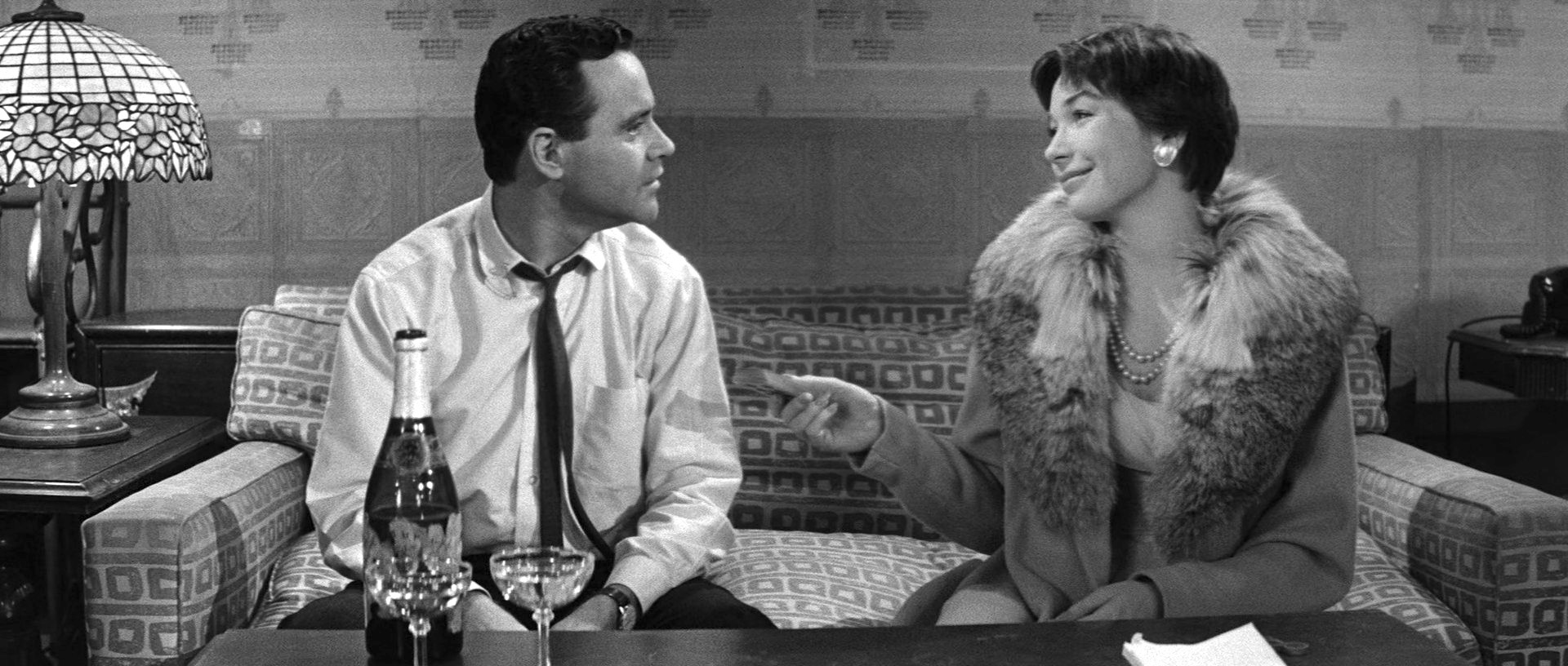
Jack Lemmon and MacLaine, in a still from The Apartment's final scene-"Shut up and deal!"

MacLaine starred in The Children's Hour (1961), based on the play by Lillian Hellman, and directed by William Wyler. Reunited with Wilder and Lemmon for Irma la Douce (1963); she received her third nomination for the Academy Award for Best Actress, in addition to winning her second Golden Globe Award for Best Actress – Motion Picture Comedy or Musical.

In 1970, MacLaine published a memoir titled Don't Fall off the Mountain, the first of her numerous books. She devoted some pages to a 1963 incident in which she had marched into the Los Angeles office of The Hollywood Reporter and punched columnist Mike Connolly in the mouth. She was angered by what he had said in his column about her ongoing contractual dispute with producer Hal Wallis, who had introduced her to the movie industry in 1954 and whom she eventually sued successfully for violating the terms of their contract. The incident with Connolly garnered a headline on the cover of the New York Post on June 11, 1963. The full story appeared on page 5 under the headline "Shirley Delivers A Punchy Line!" with a byline by Bernard Lefkowitz.

In 1965, MacLaine starred in the Cold War comedy John Goldfarb, Please Come Home!, with a screenplay by William Peter Blatty. In 1966, she co-starred with Michael Caine in the crime thriller Gambit.

In the mid-1960s, Twentieth Century-Fox offered her a salary of $750,000 on a "pay or play" basis to appear in a movie adaptation of the musical Bloomer Girl, a fee equivalent to the paydays enjoyed by top box office stars of the time. The project was canceled, triggering a lawsuit.

In 1967, MacLaine starred in seven roles as seven different women in Vittorio DeSica's episodic film Woman Times Seven, a collection of seven stories of love and adultery set in Paris. She followed that film with another comedy, The Bliss of Mrs. Blossom in 1968. Both films were box office flops.

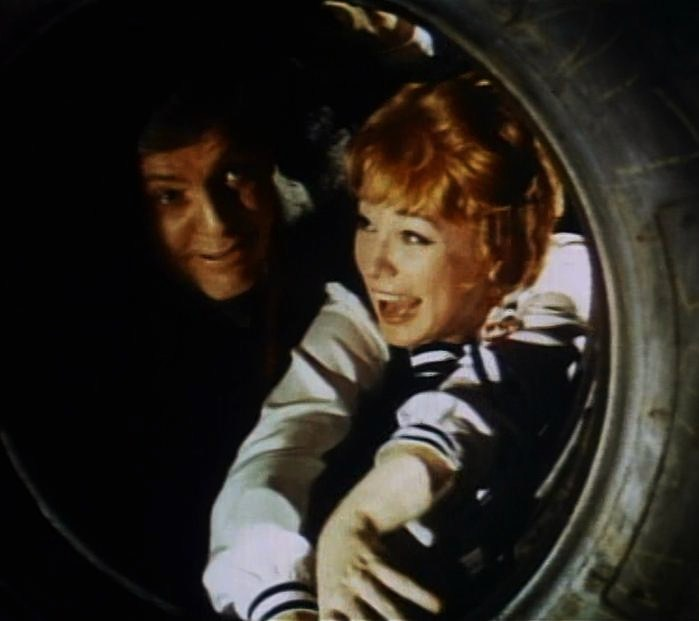
MacLaine and John McMartin in the trailer for Sweet Charity (1969)

In 1969, MacLaine starred in the film version of the musical Sweet Charity, directed by Bob Fosse, and based on the script for Federico Fellini's Nights of Cabiria which was released a decade earlier. Gwen Verdon, who originated the role onstage, had hoped to play Charity in the film version. MacLaine won the role because her name was better known to audiences at the time. Verdon signed on as assistant to choreographer Bob Fosse, helping teach MacLaine dance moves and some of the more intricate routines. MacLaine received a Golden Globe Award for Best Actress – Motion Picture Comedy or Musical nomination. The film was not a financial success.

=== 1970–1976: Continued success ===
In 1970, MacLaine was top-billed in Two Mules for Sister Sara, in a role written for Elizabeth Taylor, who chose not to appear in the movie. The Western film was a hit, primarily due to her co-star Clint Eastwood, one of the top box office stars in the world at that time. The film's director, Don Siegel, said of her: "It's hard to feel any great warmth to her. She's too unfeminine, and has too much balls. She's very, very hard."

She then moved on to television, cast as a photojournalist in a short-lived sitcom, Shirley's World (1971–1972). Co-produced by Sheldon Leonard and ITC Entertainment, the series was shot in the United Kingdom. As part of the deal, Lew Grade produced the low-budget drama Desperate Characters (1970).

MacLaine put her career on hold as she campaigned for George McGovern during the 1972 presidential election, including the Democratic primaries. As a final effort she co-produced the benefit concert Star-Spangled Women for McGovern–Shriver one week before the election. In the end, McGovern was defeated in a landslide by incumbent Richard Nixon.

In 1973, her friend, writer and director William Peter Blatty wanted to cast her for the role as the mother in The Exorcist. The role was eventually played by Ellen Burstyn. MacLaine declined the part since she had recently appeared in another film about the supernatural, The Possession of Joel Delaney (1972).

In 1975, MacLaine's documentary film The Other Half of the Sky: A China Memoir, co-directed with film and television director Claudia Weill, about the first women's delegation to China in 1973, was released theatrically and on PBS, and was nominated for the year's Academy Award for Best Documentary Feature Film.

MacLaine returned to onstage live performances in the 1970s. In 1976, she appeared in a series of concerts at the London Palladium and New York's Palace Theatre. The latter of these was released as the live album Shirley MacLaine Live at the Palace.

=== 1977–1984: Career comeback and Academy Award win ===
In 1977, MacLaine started a career comeback with the drama The Turning Point, portraying a retired ballerina. Her performance in the film received critical acclaim, earning her a fourth nomination for the Academy Award for Best Actress.

In 1978, she was awarded the Women in Film Crystal Award for outstanding women who, through their endurance and the excellence of their work, have helped to expand the role of women within the entertainment industry.

In 1979, she starred alongside Peter Sellers in Hal Ashby's satirical film Being There. The film received widespread acclaim with Roger Ebert writing that he admired the film "for having the guts to take this totally weird concept and push it to its ultimate comic conclusion". MacLaine received a British Academy Film Award, and Golden Globe Award nomination for her performance.

In 1980, MacLaine starred in two other films about adultery, A Change of Seasons alongside Anthony Hopkins and Bo Derek, and Loving Couples with James Coburn and Susan Sarandon. Neither film was a success, with Roger Ebert of the Chicago Sun-Times calling Loving Couples "a dumb remake of a very old idea that has been done so much better so many times before, that this version is wretchedly unnecessary ... the whole project smells like high-gloss sitcom."

MacLaine and Hopkins did not get along on A Change of Seasons and the film was not a success; critics faulted the screenplay. MacLaine, however, did receive positive notices from critics. Vincent Canby wrote in his The New York Times review that the film "exhibits no sense of humor and no appreciation for the ridiculous ... the screenplay [is] often dreadful ... the only appealing performance is Miss MacLaine's, and she's too good to be true. A Change of Seasons does prove one thing, though. A farce about characters who've been freed of their conventional obligations quickly becomes aimless."

In 1983, she starred in James L. Brooks's comedy-drama Terms of Endearment (1983) playing Debra Winger's mother. The film focuses on the strained relationship between mother and daughter over 30 years. The film emerged as a critical and commercial success at the box-office, grossing $108.4 million, emerging as the second-highest-grossing film of the year. The film received a leading 11 nominations at the 56th Academy Awards, and won five, including Best Picture. Both MacLaine and Winger earned nominations for the Academy Award for Best Actress, with the former winning the award, her first and only win in the category. Her performance also won the Golden Globe Award for Best Actress in a Motion Picture – Drama.

=== 1984–present: Post-Oscar career ===
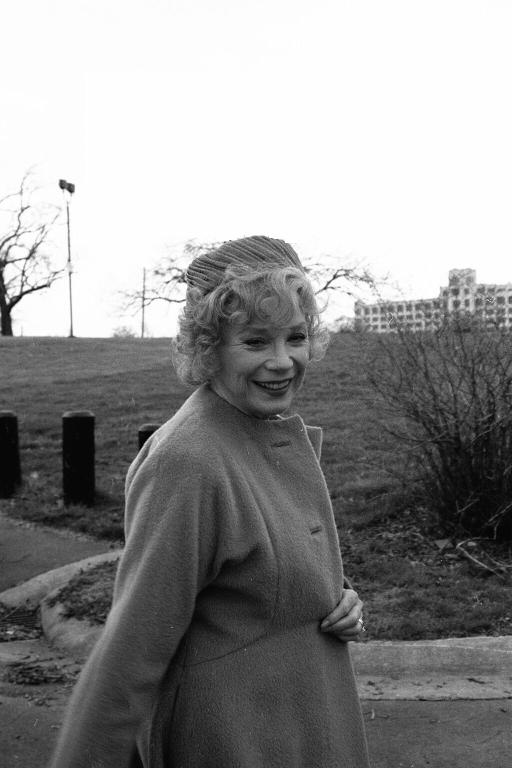
MacLaine on the set of Guarding Tess (1993)

MacLaine followed up her Oscar win with a role in Cannonball Run II (1984). After a four-year hiatus from acting, she starred in the drama Madame Sousatzka (1988), in the eponymous lead role as a Russian-American immigrant. She received positive reviews for her performance, earning her a second Golden Globe Award for Best Actress in a Motion Picture – Drama. In 1989, she released her VHS, Shirley MacLaine's Inner Workout: A Program for Relaxation and Stress Reduction through Meditation, a companion to her 1989 book, Going Within: A Guide for Inner Transformation.

MacLaine continued to star in films, such as the family southern drama Steel Magnolias (1989) directed by Herbert Ross. The film focuses on the bond that a group of women share in a small-town Southern community, and how they cope with the death of a loved one. The film was a box office success, earning $96.8 million off a budget of $15 million. MacLaine received a British Academy Film Award for her performance. She starred in Mike Nichols' film Postcards from the Edge (1990), with Meryl Streep, playing a fictionalized version of Debbie Reynolds from a screenplay by Reynolds's daughter, Carrie Fisher. Fisher wrote the screenplay based on her book. MacLaine received another Golden Globe Award nomination for her performance.

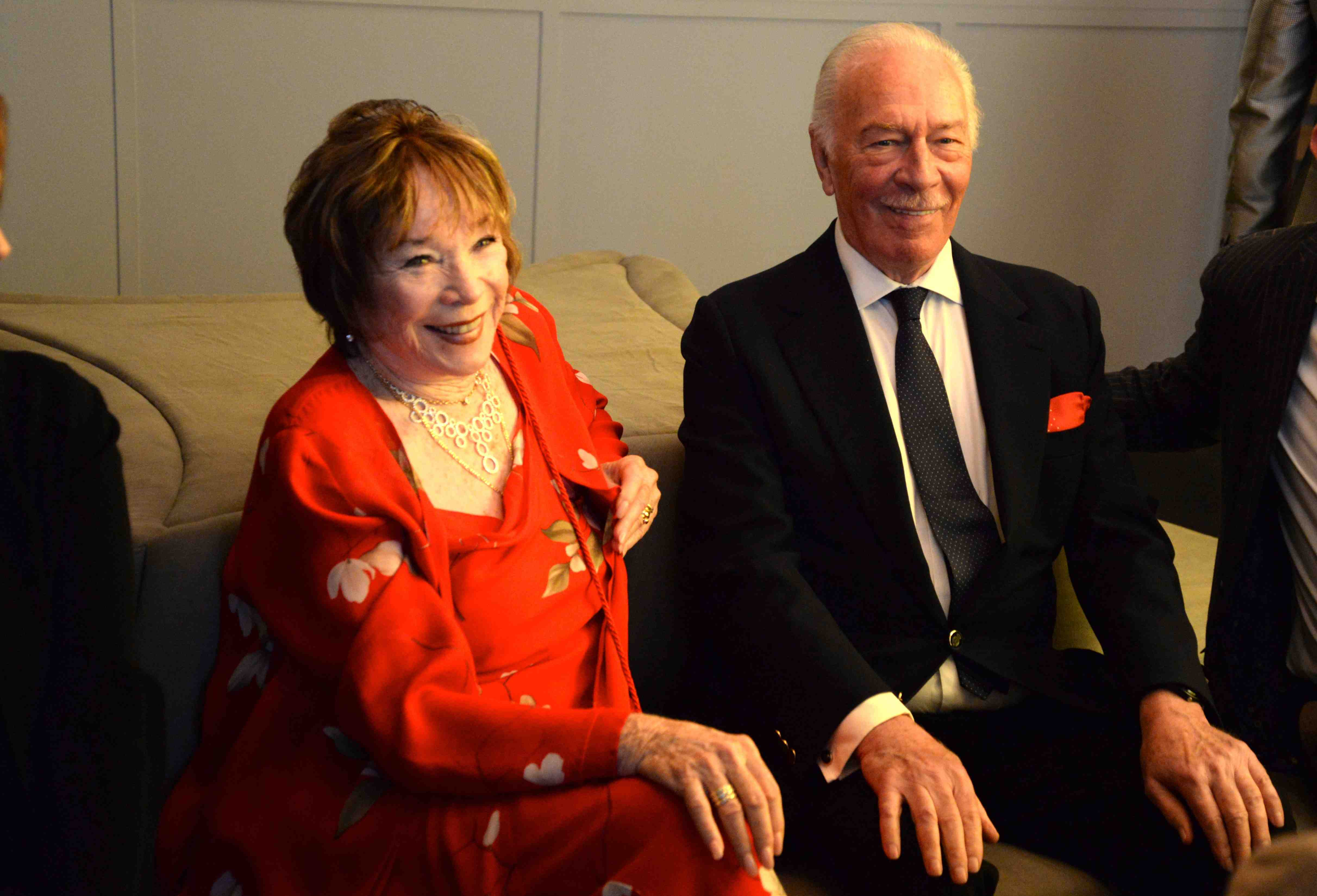
MacLaine with Christopher Plummer at the premiere of the film Elsa & Fred in 2014

MacLaine continued to act in films such as Used People (1992), with Jessica Tandy and Kathy Bates; Guarding Tess (1994), with Nicolas Cage; Mrs. Winterbourne (1996), with Ricki Lake and Brendan Fraser; The Evening Star (1996); Rumor Has It...(2005) with Kevin Costner and Jennifer Aniston; In Her Shoes (also 2005), with Cameron Diaz and Toni Collette; and Closing the Ring (2007), directed by Richard Attenborough and starring Christopher Plummer.

In 2014, she reunited with Plummer in the comedy film Elsa & Fred directed by Michael Radford. In 2000, she made her first and only feature-film directorial debut, and starred in Bruno (with Alex D. Linz), which was released to video as The Dress Code. In 2011, MacLaine starred in Richard Linklater's dark comedy film Bernie alongside Jack Black and Matthew McConaughey.

MacLaine has appeared in numerous television projects, including a 1987 miniseries based upon her bestselling autobiography, Out on a Limb. In 2001, she appeared in These Old Broads written by Carrie Fisher and co-starring Elizabeth Taylor, Debbie Reynolds, and Joan Collins. In 2009, she starred in Coco Before Chanel, a Lifetime production based on the life of French fashion designer, Coco Chanel, which earned her a Primetime Emmy Award, and Golden Globe Award nominations. She appeared in the third and fourth seasons of the British drama Downton Abbey as Martha Levinson, mother to Cora, Countess of Grantham (played by Elizabeth McGovern), and Harold Levinson (played by Paul Giamatti) in 2012–2013.

In 2016, MacLaine starred in Wild Oats with Jessica Lange. She starred in the live-action family film The Little Mermaid, based on the Hans Christian Andersen fairytale, in 2018. In 2019, she played Elf Polly in the film "Noelle". In 2022, she returned to television starring with Steve Martin, Martin Short, and Selena Gomez in the hit Hulu series Only Murders in the Building.

In 2024, MacLaine's film American Dreamer opened in theaters two years after its initial premiere at the Tribeca Film Festival.

== Personal life ==
=== Marriage and relationships ===
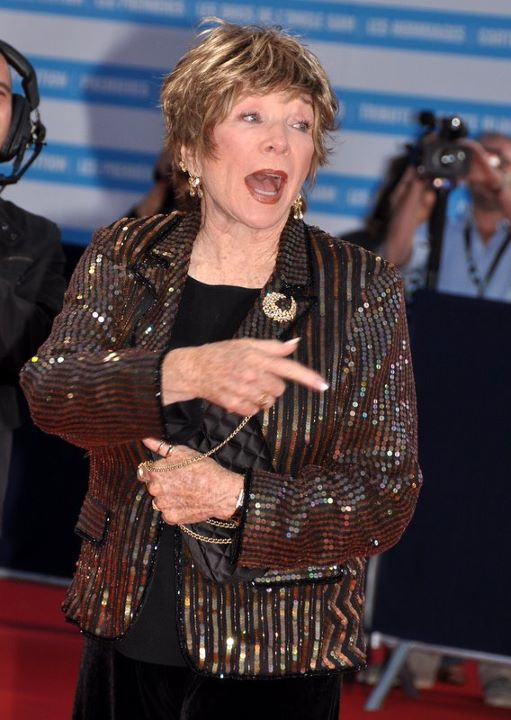
MacLaine in 2011

MacLaine was married to businessman Steve Parker from 1954 until their divorce in 1982. Their daughter, Sachi Parker, was born in 1956. In April 2011, while promoting her new book, I'm Over All That, she revealed to Oprah Winfrey that she had had an open relationship with her husband. MacLaine also told Winfrey that she often fell for the leading men she worked with, the exceptions being Jack Lemmon (The Apartment, Irma la Douce) and Jack Nicholson (Terms of Endearment). MacLaine also had long-running affairs with Lord Mountbatten, whom she met in the 1960s, and Australian politician and two-time Liberal leader Andrew Peacock.

MacLaine also engaged in feuds with co-stars including Anthony Hopkins (A Change of Seasons), who said that "she was the most obnoxious actress I have ever worked with", and Debra Winger (Terms of Endearment).

=== Beliefs and interests ===
MacLaine claimed that in a previous life in Atlantis she was the brother of a 35,000-year-old spirit named Ramtha, channeled by mystic teacher and author J. Z. Knight.

She has a strong interest in spirituality and metaphysics, which are the central themes of some of her best-selling books, including Out on a Limb and Dancing in the Light. Her spiritual explorations include walking the Way of St. James, working with Chris Griscom, and practicing Transcendental Meditation.

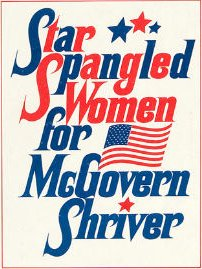
MacLaine conceived and produced the variety show Star-Spangled Women for McGovern–Shriver

The topic of New Age spirituality has also found its way into several of her films. In Albert Brooks's romantic comedy Defending Your Life (1991), the recently deceased lead characters, played by Brooks and Meryl Streep, are astonished to find MacLaine introducing their past lives in the "Past Lives Pavilion"; in Postcards from the Edge (1990), MacLaine sings a version of "I'm Still Here", with lyrics customized for her by composer Stephen Sondheim (for example, one line in the lyrics was changed to "I'm feeling transcendental – am I here?"); and in the 2001 television movie These Old Broads, MacLaine's character is a devotee of New Age spirituality.

She has an interest in UFOs, and gave numerous interviews on CNN, NBC and Fox news channels on the subject during 2007–08. In her book Sage-ing While Age-ing (2007), she described having alien encounters and witnessing the 1952 Washington, D.C., UFO incident. On an episode of The Oprah Winfrey Show in April 2011, MacLaine stated that she and her neighbor had observed numerous UFOs at her New Mexico ranch for extended periods of time.

=== Activism and politics ===
Along with her brother Warren Beatty, MacLaine used her celebrity status in instrumental roles as a fundraiser and organizer for George McGovern's campaign for president in 1972. That year, she wrote the book McGovern: The Man and His Beliefs. She appeared at her brother's concerts Four for McGovern and Together for McGovern, and she joined with Sid Bernstein to produce the woman-focused Star-Spangled Women for McGovern–Shriver variety show at Madison Square Garden. IN 1972, so much of her time was spent away from acting that her talent agent threatened to quit. She turned down film projects and spent $250,000 of her own money on political activism, equivalent to $1.5 million in 2025.

MacLaine visited China during the Cultural Revolution and was impressed by Maoism. She later recounted a positive anecdote to Deng Xiaoping, who dismissed it as false.

MacLaine is godmother to journalist Jackie Kucinich, daughter of former Democratic U.S. Representative Dennis Kucinich.

On February 7, 2013, Penguin Group USA published Sachi Parker's autobiography Lucky Me: My Life With – and Without – My Mom, Shirley MacLaine. One of its claims was that, when Sachi was in her 20s, her mother told her she believed that Steve Parker was a clone of her real father, an astronaut named Paul then traveling in the Pleiades. MacLaine denied this and called the book "virtually all fiction". In her 2024 book, The Wall of Life, MacLaine states that she and her daughter "have never been closer."

=== Legal issues ===
In 1959, MacLaine sued Hal Wallis for breach of contract. That lawsuit has been credited with ending the old-style studio star system of actor management. In 1966, MacLaine sued Twentieth Century-Fox for breach of contract after the studio reneged on its agreement to star MacLaine in a film version of the Broadway musical Bloomer Girl based on the life of Amelia Bloomer, a mid-nineteenth century feminist, suffragist, and abolitionist, that was to be filmed in Hollywood. Instead, Fox gave MacLaine one week to accept their offer of the female dramatic lead in the Western Big Country, Big Man to be filmed in Australia. The case was decided in MacLaine's favor, and affirmed on appeal by the California Supreme Court in 1970. The case is discussed in many law-school textbooks as an example of employment-contract law.

== Acting credits ==
=== Film ===
Year	Title	Role	Notes
1955	The Trouble with Harry	Jennifer Rogers	
1955	Artists and Models	Bessie Sparrowbrush	
1956	Around the World in 80 Days	Princess Aouda	
1958	The Sheepman	Dell Payton	
1958	Hot Spell	Virginia Duval	
1958	The Matchmaker	Irene Molloy	
1958	Some Came Running	Ginnie Moorehead	
1959	Ask Any Girl	Meg Wheeler	
1959	Career	Sharon Kensington	
1960	Can-Can	Simone Pistache	
1960	The Apartment	Fran Kubelik	
1960	Ocean's 11	Tipsy woman	Uncredited cameo
1961	All in a Night's Work	Katie Robbins	
1961	Two Loves	Anna Vorontosov	
1961	The Children's Hour	Martha Dobie	
1962	My Geisha	Lucy Dell / Yoko Mori	
1962	Two for the Seesaw	Gittel Mosca	
1963	Irma la Douce	Irma la Douce	
1964	What a Way to Go!	Louisa May Foster	
1964	The Yellow Rolls-Royce	Mae Jenkins	
1965	John Goldfarb, Please Come Home!	Jenny Erichson	
1966	Gambit	Nicole Chang	
1967	Woman Times Seven	Paulette / Maria Teresa / Linda / Edith / Eve Minou / Marie / Jeanne	
1968	The Bliss of Mrs. Blossom	Harriet Blossom	
1969	Sweet Charity	Charity Hope Valentine	
1970	Two Mules for Sister Sara	Sara	
1971	Desperate Characters	Sophie Bentwood	
1972	The Possession of Joel Delaney	Norah Benson	
1975	The Other Half of the Sky: A China Memoir	Herself	Documentary; also writer, co-director, producer
1977	The Turning Point	Deedee Rodgers	
1979	Being There	Eve Rand	
1980	Loving Couples	Evelyn	
1980	A Change of Seasons	Karyn Evans	
1981	Sois belle et tais-toi (Be Pretty and Shut Up)	Herself	Documentary by Delphine Seyrig
1983	Terms of Endearment	Aurora Greenway	Academy Award for Best Actress
1984	Cannonball Run II	Veronica	
1987	Out on a Limb	Shirley MacLaine	Television miniseries
1988	Madame Sousatzka	Madame Yuvline Sousatzka	
1989	Steel Magnolias	Louisa "Ouiser" Boudreaux	
1990	Waiting for the Light	Aunt Zena	
1990	Postcards from the Edge	Doris Mann	
1991	Defending Your Life	Shirley MacLaine	
1992	Used People	Pearl Berman	
1993	Wrestling Ernest Hemingway	Helen Cooney	
1994	Guarding Tess	Tess Carlisle	
1996	The Evening Star	Aurora Greenway	
1996	Mrs. Winterbourne	Grace Winterbourne	
1997	A Smile Like Yours	Martha	Uncredited
1999	Get Bruce	Herself	Documentary
2000	The Dress Code	Helen	Also director
2003	Carolina	Grandma Millicent Mirabeau	
2003	Broadway: The Golden Age	Herself	Documentary
2005	Rumor Has It...	Katharine Richelieu	
2005	Bewitched	Iris Smythson / Endora	
2005	In Her Shoes	Ella Hirsch	
2007	Closing the Ring	Ethel Ann Harris	
2010	Valentine's Day	Estelle Paddington	
2011	Bernie	Marjorie Nugent	
2013	The Secret Life of Walter Mitty	Edna Mitty	
2014	Elsa & Fred	Elsa Hayes	
2016	Wild Oats	Eva	
2017	The Last Word	Harriett Lauler	
2018	The Little Mermaid	Grandmother Eloise	
2019	Jim Button and Luke the Engine Driver	Mrs. Grindtooth	Voice (English version)
2019	Noelle	Elf Polly	
2022	American Dreamer	Astrid Fanelli	
TBA	People Not Places	Clare Winters	

=== Television ===
Year	Title	Role	Notes
1955	Shower of Stars	Herself	2 episodes
1976	Gypsy in my Soul	Herself	Television special with Lucille Ball
1971–1972	Shirley's World	Shirley Logan	17 episodes
1977	The Shirley MacLaine Special: Where Do We Go From Here?	Herself	Television special
1979	Shirley MacLaine at the Lido	Herself	Television special
1987	Out on a Limb	Herself	Television film
1995	The West Side Waltz	Margaret Mary Elderdice	Television film
1998	Stories from My Childhood	Narrator	Episode: "The Nutcracker"
1999	Joan of Arc	Madame de Beaurevoir	2 episodes
2000	The Unknown Peter Sellers	Herself	AMC television documentary
2001	These Old Broads	Kate Westbourne	Television film
2002	Salem Witch Trials	Rebecca Nurse	Television film
2002	Hell on Heels: The Battle of Mary Kay	Mary Kay	Television film
2008	Coco Chanel	Coco Chanel	Television film
2008	Anne of Green Gables: A New Beginning	Amelia Thomas	Television film
2012–2013	Downton Abbey	Martha Levinson	3 episodes
2014	Glee	June Dolloway	2 episodes
2016	A Heavenly Christmas	Pearl	Television film
2022	Only Murders in the Building	Leonora Folger / Rose Cooper	2 episodes

=== Theatre ===
Year	Title	Role	Notes	Ref.
1953	Me and Juliet	Dance Ensemble	Majestic Theatre, Broadway	
1954	The Pajama Game	Dancer/Gladys	St. James Theatre, Broadway	
1976	Shirley MacLaine	Herself	Palace Theatre, Broadway	
1984	Shirley MacLaine on Broadway	Herself	Gershwin Theatre, Broadway	

== Awards and nominations ==
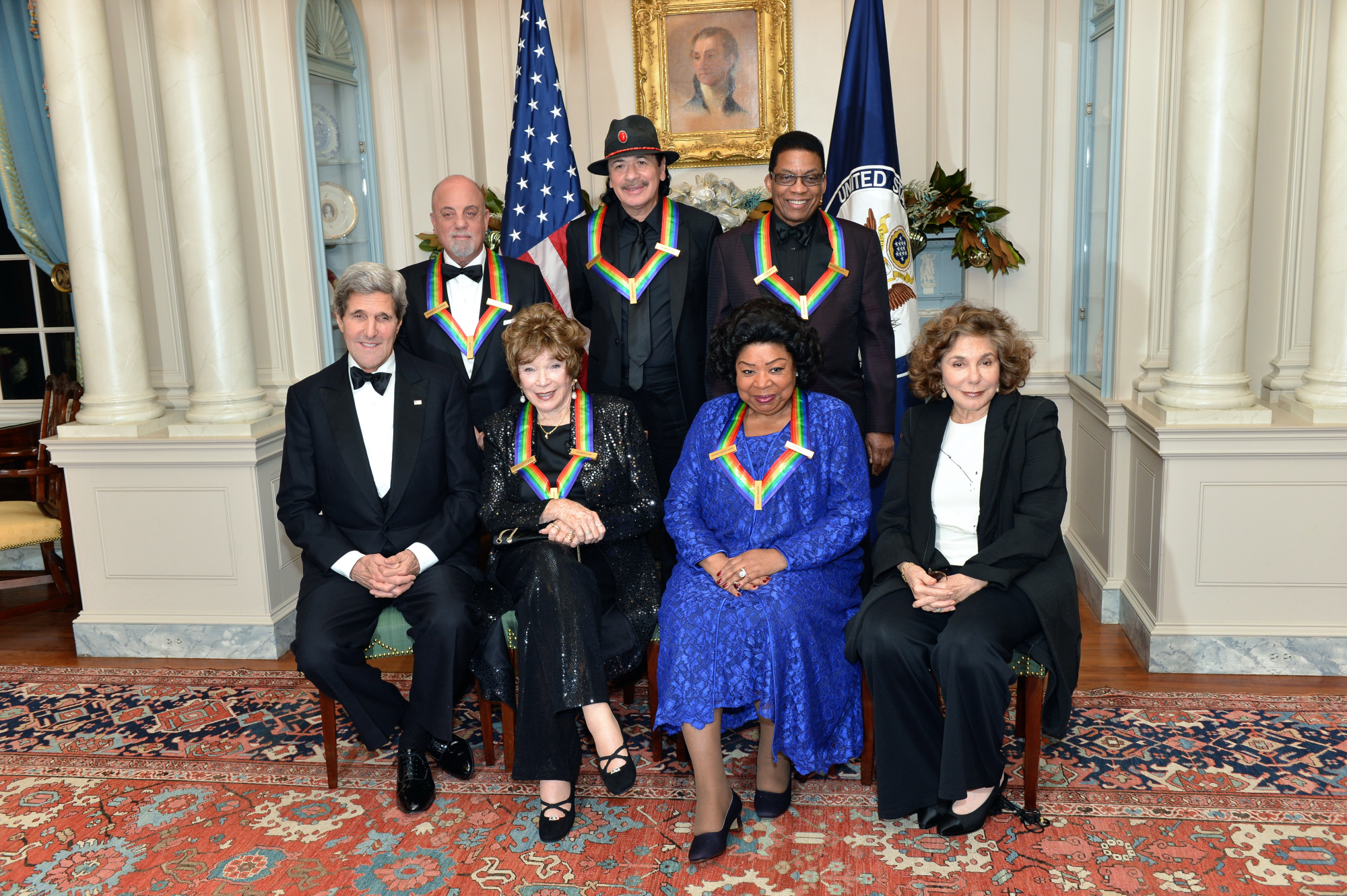
U.S. Secretary of State John Kerry and Teresa Heinz with 2013 Kennedy Center honorees: Shirley MacLaine, Martina Arroyo, Billy Joel, Carlos Santana, and Herbie Hancock in 2013.

MacLaine was featured in a segment during the 2017 Academy Awards telecast in which Charlize Theron praised her work in The Apartment. She later presented the Academy Award for Best International Film of the year alongside Theron.

Organizations	Year	Award	Result	Ref.
American Film Institute	2012	AFI Life Achievement Award	Honored	
Berlin International Film Festival	1999	Honorary Golden Bear	Honored	
Chicago Film Critics Association	2005	Career Achievement Award	Honored	
Elle Women in Hollywood	2005	Icon Award	Honored	
Elle Women in Hollywood	2012	Woman of the Year	Honored	
Film Society at Lincoln Center	1995	Chaplin Gala Tribute	Honored	
Golden Globe Awards	1998	Cecil B. DeMille Award	Honored	
Government of France	2001	Legion of Honor	Honored	
Hollywood Walk of Fame	1960	Motion Picture Star at 1617 Vine Street	Honored	
John F. Kennedy Center for the Performing Arts	2013	Kennedy Center Honors	Honored	
Palm Springs International Film Festival	2006	Lifetime Achievement Award	Honored	
Telluride Film Festival	1996	Silver Medallion Award	Honored	

== Bibliography ==
- MacLaine, Shirley (1970). Don't Fall Off the Mountain. New York: W.W. Norton & Company Limited. ISBN 978-0-393-07338-6.
- MacLaine, Shirley (1972). McGovern: The Man and His Beliefs. New York: W.W. Norton & Company Limited. ISBN 978-0-393-05341-8.
- MacLaine, Shirley (1975). You Can Get There from Here. New York: W.W. Norton & Company Limited. ISBN 978-0-393-07489-5.
- MacLaine, Shirley (1983). Out on a Limb. New York: Bantam Doubleday Dell Publishing Group. ISBN 978-0-553-05035-6.
- MacLaine, Shirley (1986). Dancing in the Light. New York: Bantam Books. ISBN 978-0-553-76196-2.
- MacLaine, Shirley (1987). It's All in the Playing. New York: Bantam Books. ISBN 978-0-553-05217-6.
- MacLaine, Shirley (1990). Going Within: A Guide to Inner Transformation. New York: Bantam Books. ISBN 978-055-328-3310.
- MacLaine, Shirley (1991). Dance While You Can. New York: Bantam Books. ISBN 978-0-553-07607-3.
- MacLaine, Shirley (1995). My Lucky Stars: A Hollywood Memoir. New York: Bantam Books. ISBN 978-0-553-09717-7.
- MacLaine, Shirley (2000). The Camino: A Journey of the Spirit. New York: Simon & Schuster Adult Publishing Group. ISBN 978-0-7434-0072-5. (Published in Europe as: MacLaine, Shirley (2001). The Camino: A Pilgrimage of Courage. London: Pocket Books. ISBN 0-7434-0921-3.)
- MacLaine, Shirley (2003). Out on a Leash: Exploring the Nature of Reality and Love. New York: Simon & Schuster Adult Publishing Group. ISBN 978-0-7434-8506-7.
- MacLaine, Shirley (2007). Sage-ing While Age-ing. New York: Simon & Schuster Adult Publishing Group. ISBN 978-1-4165-5041-9.
- MacLaine, Shirley (2011). I'm Over All That: And Other Confessions. New York: Simon & Schuster Adult Publishing Group. ISBN 978-1-4516-0729-1.
- MacLaine, Shirley (2013). What If...: A lifetime of questions, speculations, reasonable guesses, and a few things I know for sure. New York: Simon & Schuster. ISBN 978-1-47113-139-4.
- MacLaine, Shirley (2016). Above the Line: My 'Wild Oats' Adventure. Simon & Schuster. ISBN 978-1501136412.
- MacLaine, Shirley (2024). The Wall of Life: Pictures and Stories from This Marvelous Lifetime. Crown. ISBN 978-0593735312.
