= Used People =

1992 film by Beeban Kidron

- Theatrical release poster
- Directed by: Beeban Kidron
- Screenplay by: Todd Graff
- Based on: The Grandma Plays by Todd Graff
- Produced by: Peggy Rajski
- Starring: Shirley MacLaine; Kathy Bates; Jessica Tandy; Marcello Mastroianni; Marcia Gay Harden; Sylvia Sidney; Joe Pantoliano
- Cinematography: David Watkin
- Edited by: John Tintori
- Music by: Rachel Portman
- Production companies: U. P. Productions; Largo Entertainment
- Distributed by: 20th Century Fox
- Release date: December 16, 1992
- Running time: 115 minutes
- Countries: United States; Japan
- Language: English
- Budget: $16 million
- Box office: $28 million

Used People is a 1992 romantic comedy film directed by Beeban Kidron. The film stars Shirley MacLaine, Marcello Mastroianni, Bob Dishy, Kathy Bates, Marcia Gay Harden, Jessica Tandy, Doris Roberts and Joe Pantoliano. The screenplay by Todd Graff, adapted from his 1988 off-Broadway play The Grandma Plays, takes a humorous look at a highly dysfunctional family living in the New York City borough of Queens circa 1969. It is an international co-production between Japan and the United States.

== Plot ==
In 1969, Pearl Berman returns home from her husband Jack's funeral, her grief disrupted by her many relatives animatedly discussing which parkway offered the best route to the cemetery. Pearl's family discusses subjects – from body odor to toilets to Tupperware to borscht – as if they are worthy of a major debate.

Into a household filled with kvetchers steps Joe Meledandri, a distinguished Italian who years ago met Pearl's wayward husband in a bar, and convinced him to return to her. He has desired her ever since, and now that Pearl is a widow, Joe feels the time is right to make his move. He invites her for coffee, his first step on the road to seduction.

What remains to be seen is if he can overcome family objections regarding religious differences and if he is willing to accept Pearl's daughters: Bibby and Norma, who dresses up as celebrities to cope with grief following the death of one of her children and her divorce. At her father's funeral, Norma dresses as Jackie Kennedy did at her husband's funeral, serves her surviving son breakfast while dressed as Marilyn Monroe, and impersonates Faye Dunaway and Barbra Streisand, among others.

== Cast ==
- Shirley MacLaine as Pearl Berman
- Kathy Bates as Barbara "Bibby" LaSelle
  - Emma Tammi as Young Bibby LaSalle
- Jessica Tandy as Freida
- Marcello Mastroianni as Joe Meledandri
- Marcia Gay Harden as Norma Schulman
  - Asia Vieira as Young Norma Schulman
- Sylvia Sidney as Becky
- Joe Pantoliano as Frank
- Bob Dishy as Jack Berman
- Charles Cioffi as Paolo
- Louis Guss as Uncle Normy
- Helen Hanft as Aunt Ruthie
- Irving Metzman as Uncle Al
- Doris Roberts as Aunt Lonnie
- Lee Wallace as Uncle Harry
- Matthew Branton as Swee'Pea
- Gil Filar as Mark
- Maia Filar as Rhonda

== Principal production credits ==
- Producer – Lawrence Gordon
- Executive producers – Michael Barnathan, Lloyd Levin
- Original music – Rachel Portman
- Cinematography – David Watkin
- Choreography – Patricia Birch
- Production designer – Stuart Wurtzel
- Art director – Gregory P. Keen
- Costume design – Marilyn Vance

== Reception ==
As of October 2019, Used People holds a rating of 44% on Rotten Tomatoes based on 16 reviews.

In her review in The New York Times, Janet Maslin observed, "As directed by Beeban Kidron, [the film] makes an international issue out of an Italian-Jewish courtship. It also slathers the ethnic equivalent of corn onto every sentimental scene."

Roger Ebert of the Chicago Sun-Times wrote, "The movie is by turns serious, satirical, bittersweet, maudlin, satirical, romantic, and farcical... MacLaine is a pro and survives the material... We care about her enough, indeed, to wonder if meeting the Mastroianni character is really the best thing that could have happened to her. He doesn't often seem like a real human in this movie; he's more like an all-purpose writer's device. The odds are against any sane person being able to behave like this man... what the movie could not overcome, for me at least, is the lack of any convincing romantic chemistry between [the two]."

Variety stated, "A modern, absurdist sensibility informs the soap opera Used People... which harks back to '50s weepies... MacLaine's precise acting is laudatory and balanced by a very sympathetic turn by twinkle-eyed Mastroianni, in his best English-language role by far. The support ensemble is excellent."

Rita Kempley of The Washington Post said, "Used People wants to be Moonstruck with matzo balls, but it's less an eccentric romantic comedy than an icky, three-layered Jewish mother joke... it's rich in character if rather trite in theme and scene."

In The New Yorker, Michael Sragow observed, "Life goes on – for the audience, seemingly forever — in yet another ethnic comedy-drama ... In the end, love conquers everything from religious differences to mental illness: everything, that is, except the forced eccentricity and bickering stereotypes in Todd Graff's script."

In his review of the videotape release, Ty Burr of Entertainment Weekly rated the film C− and added, "Everything's in italics in this Jewish Moonstruck... MacLaine honks nasally ... Mastroianni talks in spumoni aphorisms... the score oompahs with grating merriment as characters parade cutesy tics instead of human traits. With stars as gifted as Jessica Tandy, Sylvia Sidney, and Kathy Bates drowning in the tough-talking treacle, it's one of those movies that gives New York a worse name than it already has."

The film grossed $18 million in the United States and Canada, and $10 million overseas for a worldwide total of $28 million.

== Accolades ==
Marcello Mastroianni was nominated for the Golden Globe Award for Best Actor – Motion Picture Musical or Comedy and Shirley MacLaine was nominated for the Golden Globe Award for Best Actress – Motion Picture Musical or Comedy. The Casting Society of America nominated Mary Colquhoun for the Artios Award for Best Casting for a Dramatic Feature Film.
