= The Other Half of the Sky: A China Memoir =

1975 film

- Directed by: Shirley MacLaine; Claudia Weill
- Written by: Shirley MacLaine
- Produced by: Shirley MacLaine
- Narrated by: Shirley MacLaine
- Cinematography: Joan Weidman; Claudia Weill
- Edited by: Aviva Slesin; Claudia Weill
- Production company: Shirley MacLaine Productions
- Distributed by: New Day Films
- Release date: 1975
- Running time: 74 minutes
- Country: United States
- Language: English

The Other Half of the Sky: A China Memoir is a 1975 American documentary film directed by Shirley MacLaine and Claudia Weill. It was nominated for an Academy Award for Best Documentary Feature.

The film depicts a group of American women who travel to China during the Cultural Revolution. They see surgery performed under acupuncture anesthesia, and the "glory" of life on Chinese farms and schools under Mao. The film only shows the idealized version of China her government handlers allowed her to see, and was dismissed in the West as propaganda.

MacLaine later recounted a anecdote from her visit to Deng Xiaoping, who dismissed it as false.
