= Sweet Charity (film) =

1969 musical film by Bob Fosse

- Theatrical release poster
- Directed by: Bob Fosse
- Screenplay by: Peter Stone
- Based on: Sweet Charity (1966 play) by Neil Simon; Nights of Cabiria (1957 film) by; Federico Fellini; Ennio Flaiano; Tullio Pinelli; Pier Paolo Pasolini
- Produced by: Robert Arthur
- Starring: Shirley MacLaine; John McMartin; Chita Rivera; Paula Kelly; Stubby Kaye; Ricardo Montalbán; Sammy Davis Jr.
- Cinematography: Robert Surtees
- Edited by: Stuart Gilmore
- Music by: Cy Coleman (score); Dorothy Fields (lyrics); Ralph Burns (adaptation)
- Distributed by: Universal Pictures
- Release date: April 1, 1969
- Running time: 149 minutes
- Country: United States
- Language: English
- Budget: $8–20 million
- Box office: $8 million

Sweet Charity is a 1969 American musical comedy-drama film, directed and choreographed by Bob Fosse. It was adapted by Peter Stone from the 1966 stage musical—also directed and choreographed by Fosse—in turn based on the 1957 film Nights of Cabiria. It stars Shirley MacLaine in the title role, a taxi dancer at a Times Square dance hall. The cast also features John McMartin, Chita Rivera, Paula Kelly, Stubby Kaye, Ricardo Montalbán, and Sammy Davis Jr.

The film was released by Universal Pictures on April 1, 1969. It received a mixed critical reception, but received three Academy Award nominations - Best Score, Best Art Direction and Best Costume Design. MacLaine was nominated for a Golden Globe Award for her performance. Retrospective reviews have been more positive.

== Plot ==
Charity Hope Valentine works as a taxi dancer along with her friends, Nickie and Helene. She longs for love, but has bad luck with men, first seen when her married boyfriend, Charlie, pushes her off Gapstow Bridge in Central Park and steals her life savings of $427. The Fandango Ballroom and its sleazily erotic setting are introduced by the song "Big Spender". Charity shares her disappointment and hopes with her co-workers Nickie and Helene in several scenes throughout the film.

Somewhat later, Charity meets famous movie star Vittorio Vitale, just as he breaks up with his girlfriend Ursula. Charity goes to a nightclub, where the guests perform the "Rich Man's Frug", and later has dinner with Vittorio at his apartment. When Vittorio leaves the room momentarily, Charity celebrates what seems to be her good fortune with the song "If They Could See Me Now". Right after, however, Ursula comes back to Vittorio, and Charity is forced to spend a humiliating night in a closet while Vittorio and Ursula make love and sleep together. Charity again returns to the Fandango, where she, Nickie, and Helene commiserate on the building's rooftop with "There's Got to Be Something Better Than This".

Looking for a more respectable and rewarding line of work, Charity goes to an employment agency, but she is forced to admit that she has no higher education or qualifications, and the interviewer thinks she has been sent in as a joke. She agrees that she has and leaves. The building's elevator breaks down between floors and Charity supports a man who starts to panic. This is the shy and claustrophobic Oscar Lindquist, who pursues Charity onto the street and finally asks her to go on a date with him. The two go out together several times, including a visit to an alternative church presided over by a preacher named Big Daddy and "worshiping" with the song "The Rhythm of Life".

Charity does not tell Oscar what her job is and lets him think she works in a bank. Oscar proposes marriage and professes to be broadminded when she does finally tell him her trade. Charity's hopes are once again lifted, celebrated in the huge production number "I'm a Brass Band". Oscar meets Charity's friends at the Fandango when they throw a party for her. However at the marriage license bureau Oscar tells her that he has tried to accept her past but is unable to go through with the marriage.

Charity returns to the bridge in Central Park where she first appeared in the film and seems ready to throw herself off it, but a passing group of young hippies singing about love and peace hand her a flower, lifting her spirits.

=== Alternate ending ===
An alternate ending, included on the Laserdisc, DVD and Blu-ray releases, picks up after Oscar leaves Charity. Oscar starts to go crazy in his apartment and, feeling suffocated, goes for a walk in the park. He sees Charity on their bridge in Central Park and thinks she is going to jump. Racing to rescue her, he trips and falls in the water. Charity jumps in after him, but can't swim so Oscar rescues her. Oscar realizes Charity is the only breath of fresh air in his life, proposes again, and she accepts.

Fosse thought the ending was too corny, but filmed it anticipating that the studio would demand a happy ending. In the end, they agreed with Fosse and kept the original ending from the stage version.

== Cast ==
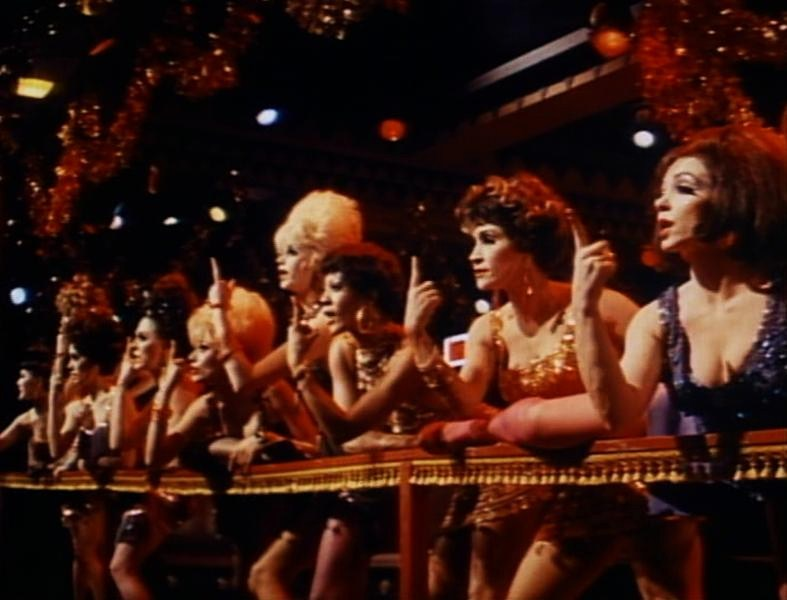
Paula Kelly (third from right) and Chita Rivera (second from right) as dance hostess girls performing "Big Spender".

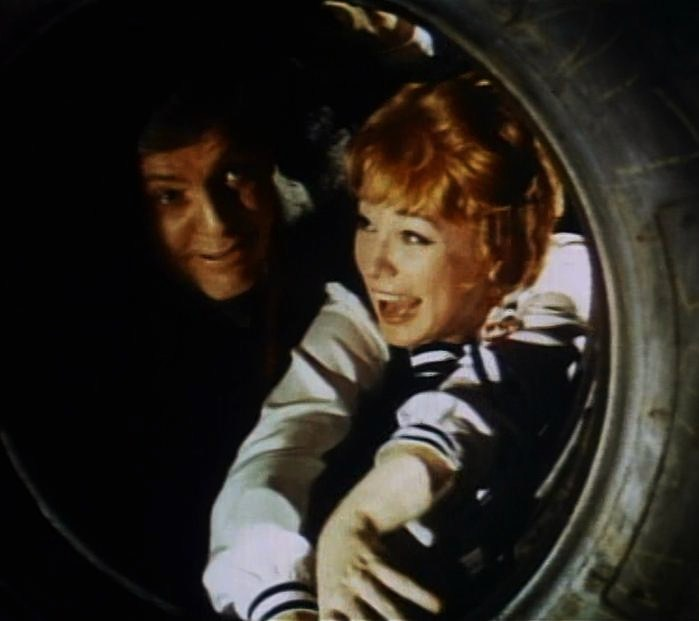
John McMartin and Shirley MacLaine

- Shirley MacLaine as Charity
- John McMartin as Oscar
- Chita Rivera as Nickie
- Paula Kelly as Helene
- Stubby Kaye as Herman
- Barbara Bouchet as Ursula
- Ricardo Montalbán as Vittorio
- Sammy Davis Jr. as Big Daddy
- Suzanne Charny as "Rich Man's Frug" lead dancer
- Alan Hewitt as Nicholsby
- Dante DiPaolo as Charlie
- Lonnie Burr as Willie
- Nolan Leary as Manfred

Ben Vereen, in his first screen role, appears in the film's dance ensemble. Other dancers include Lorene Yarnell, Lee Roy Reams, Toni Basil, Chelsea Brown, Linda Clifford, Kathryn Doby, Louise Quick, Lance LeGault, and Shelley Graham. Bud Cort makes an early, uncredited appearance as a hippie.

== Musical numbers ==
1. "My Personal Property" *
2. "Big Spender"
3. "The Pompeii Club"
4. "Rich Man's Frug"
5. "If My Friends Could See Me Now"
6. "The Hustle"
7. "There's Got to Be Something Better Than This"
8. "It's a Nice Face" *
9. "The Rhythm of Life"
10. "Sweet Charity" **
11. "I'm a Brass Band"
12. "I Love to Cry at Weddings"
13. "Where Am I Going?"

* New song written for the film
** New melody written for the film

== Production ==
Shirley MacLaine, a friend of Fosse and his wife and partner Gwen Verdon, had suggested the adaptation to Lew Wasserman, the head of Universal Pictures. Verdon, who had starred as Charity in Fosse's original Broadway musical, had wanted to play the lead again but endorsed MacLaine to star in the film since she was a recognizable movie star. Verdon did contribute to the film, without credit, as the assistant choreographer. Chita Rivera and Paula Kelly, who had appeared in a London stage production of the play, have supporting roles in the film. John McMartin was the only lead actor from the Broadway version to reprise his role.

During production, Fosse had conflicts with his original producer, Ross Hunter, who was replaced by Robert Arthur. I.A.L. Diamond, who had written the screenplays for The Apartment and Irma la Douce, both starring MacLaine and co-written and directed by Billy Wilder, was originally hired as screenwriter, but he too quit after disagreements with Fosse and was replaced by Peter Stone. According to the AFI Catalog of Feature Films, Diamond wanted to revert to the “original theme” of Nights of Cabiria (e.g. prostitution).

Shelley Graham, soon to be known as adult film actress Georgina Spelvin, was an uncredited dancer in the film She doubled for Shirley MacLaine in a handful of scenes.

Filming took place on-location in New York City, and at the Universal Studios Lot.

== Reception ==
=== Critical response ===
Critical reception of the film at release was mixed. While some praised Fosse's innovative approaches to the staging of some numbers and Shirley MacLaine's performance, others found it overlong, most of the songs ineffective, and the storyline insufficiently engaging. Reviewers familiar with the stage version were especially critical. Vincent Canby in the New York Times was especially harsh, disparaging the film as "so enlarged and so inflated that it has become another maximal movie: a long, noisy and, finally, dim imitation of its source material," and complaining that although MacLaine "often looks like Miss Verdon, she never succeeds in re-creating the eccentric line that gave cohesion to the original". Pauline Kael wrote: "It's a disaster, but zoom-happy Fosse's choreographic conceptions are intensely dramatic, and the movie has some of the best dancing in American musicals of the period."

The film has been reappraised over the years and has been reviewed positively. Sweet Charity has an 82% "Fresh" rating on review aggregation site Rotten Tomatoes based on 11 reviews, with an average rating of 6.40/10.

=== Box office ===
The actual cost of the film's production has been disputed, amidst conflicting accounts by Universal Pictures, reports in Variety, and claims by Fosse himself, but estimates range from $8 million to more than $20 million. Regardless of the actual cost, the film's returns were disappointing. By January 1970, the film had made only $1.1 million, just a bit more than the cost of Shirley MacLaine's salary. By 1976, according to Variety, the film earned rentals of $4,025,000 in the US and Canada.

=== Accolades ===
The film was screened at the 1969 Cannes Film Festival, but outside of the main competition.

Award	Category	Nominee(s)	Result	Ref.
Academy Awards	Best Art Direction	Art Direction: Alexander Golitzen and George C. Webb; Set Decoration: Jack D. Moore	Nominated	
Academy Awards	Best Costume Design	Edith Head	Nominated	
Academy Awards	Best Score of a Musical Picture – Original or Adaptation	Cy Coleman	Nominated	
Golden Globe Awards	Best Actress in a Motion Picture – Musical or Comedy	Shirley MacLaine	Nominated	
Laurel Awards	Top Musical		Nominated	
Laurel Awards	Top Female Comedy Performance	Shirley MacLaine	Nominated	

== In popular culture ==
Sweet Charity and its making are briefly alluded to under a different title in Fosse's autobiographical musical film All That Jazz (1979). Additionally, the film's failure marks the first episode of Fosse/Verdon, the 2019 biographical mini-series about Fosse and Gwen Verdon, their rocky marriage, and their long creative partnership.

Sweet Charity, particularly the "Rich Man's Frug" musical number, has served as a visual reference for dance sequences in contemporary popular culture. Several music videos have paid tribute to that number, including the videos for Emma Bunton's 2003 "Maybe", Beyoncé's 2007 "Get Me Bodied" and 2008 "Single Ladies (Put a Ring On It)", and Ariana Grande's 2014 "Problem". The viral dance that Jenna Ortega performed in the November 23, 2022 episode of Wednesday, and choreographed, was partially inspired by "Rich Man's Frug" as well.

== See also ==
- List of American films of 1969
