= The Trouble with Harry =

1955 film by Alfred Hitchcock

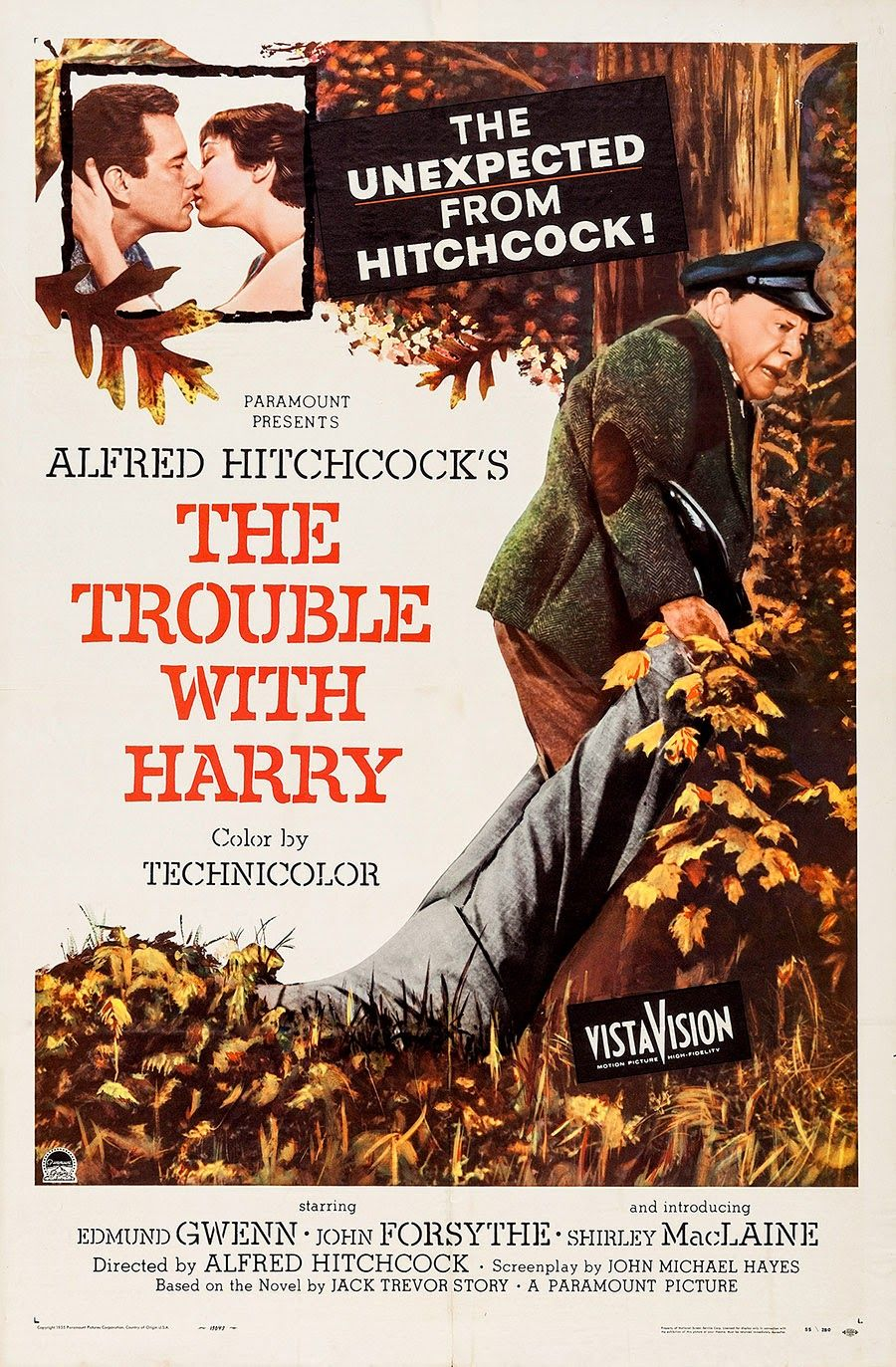
- Original poster
- Directed by: Alfred Hitchcock
- Screenplay by: John Michael Hayes
- Based on: The Trouble with Harry; 1949 novel by Jack Trevor Story
- Produced by: Alfred Hitchcock
- Starring: Edmund Gwenn; John Forsythe; Shirley MacLaine
- Cinematography: Robert Burks
- Edited by: Alma Macrorie
- Music by: Bernard Herrmann
- Production company: Alfred J. Hitchcock Productions
- Distributed by: Paramount Pictures (Note: After the film's release, Paramount transferred the distribution rights to Hitchcock's estate, where they were acquired by Universal Pictures in 1983.)
- Release date: September 30, 1955 (Barre, Vermont)
- Running time: 99 minutes
- Country: United States
- Language: English
- Budget: $1.2 million
- Box office: $3.5 million

The Trouble with Harry is a 1955 American Technicolor black comedy film directed by Alfred Hitchcock. The screenplay by John Michael Hayes was based on the 1949 novel of the same name by Jack Trevor Story. It stars Edmund Gwenn, John Forsythe, Mildred Natwick, Jerry Mathers and Shirley MacLaine in her film debut. The film was released in the United States on September 30, 1955, then re-released in 1984 after the distribution rights were acquired by Universal Pictures. It received generally favorable reviews from critics.

== Plot ==
The quirky but down-to-earth residents of the small hamlet of Highwater, Vermont encounter the freshly dead body of Harry Worp, which has inconveniently appeared on the hillside above the town. The problem of who the deceased is, who was responsible for his sudden death, and what should be done with the body is "the trouble with Harry."

Captain Wiles is sure that he killed the man with a stray shot from his rifle while hunting, until it is shown he actually shot a rabbit. Jennifer Rogers, Harry's estranged wife, believes she killed Harry because she hit him hard with a milk bottle. Miss Gravely is certain that the man died after a blow from the heel of her hiking boot when he lunged at her out of the bushes, while still reeling from the blow he received from Jennifer. Sam Marlowe, a nonconformist artist, is open-minded about the situation and prepared to help his neighbors and new friends in any way he can. No one is much upset about Harry's death.

However, they all are hoping that the body will not come to the attention of "the authorities" in the form of cold, humorless Deputy Sheriff Calvin Wiggs, who earns his living per arrest. The Captain, Jennifer, Miss Gravely and Sam bury the body and then dig it up again several times throughout the day. They then hide the body in a bathtub before finally putting it back on the hill where it first appeared, in order to make it appear as if it was just discovered.

Finally it is learned that Harry died of natural causes; no foul play was involved. In the meantime, Sam and Jennifer have fallen in love and wish to marry, and the Captain and Miss Gravely have also become a couple. Sam has been able to sell all his paintings to a passing millionaire, although Sam refuses money and instead requests a few simple gifts for his friends and himself.

== Cast ==
- Edmund Gwenn as Capt. Albert Wiles
- John Forsythe as Sam Marlowe
- Shirley MacLaine as Jennifer Rogers
- Mildred Natwick as Miss Ivy Gravely
- Mildred Dunnock as Mrs. Wiggs
- Jerry Mathers as Arnie Rogers
- Royal Dano as Deputy Sheriff Calvin Wiggs
- Parker Fennelly as Millionaire
- Barry Macollum as Tramp
- Dwight Marfield as Dr. Greenbow
- Philip Truex as Harry Worp (the corpse, uncredited)

== Production ==
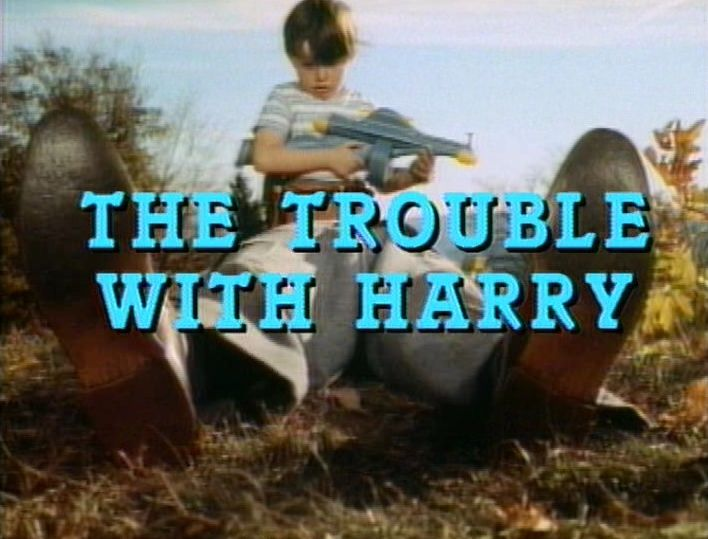
The title shot in the film trailer shows the discovery of Harry by Arnie (Jerry Mathers).

Primary location shooting took place in Craftsbury, Vermont. Assuming that the town would be in full foliage, the company showed up for outdoor shots on September 27, 1954. To the filmmakers' shock, there was hardly any foliage left; to achieve a full effect, leaves were glued to the trees. Several scenes in the film had to be shot in a rented high school gym because of persistent rain. In the gym, a 500-lb (226-kg) camera fell from a great height and barely missed Hitchcock, and the sound of the rain on the roof of the gym necessitated extensive post-production re-recording. Other locations included Morrisville and Barre, with the shooting lasting up to December of that year. Full details on the making of the film are in Steven DeRosa's book Writing with Hitchcock.

The paintings by the character Sam Marlowe were painted by American abstract expressionist artist John Ferren, who was present during principal photography in Vermont. While there, he instructed John Forsythe in the correct painting technique for his on-screen work. Hitchcock was particularly interested in Ferren's work, for his vivid use of color, which he thought would be resonant with the autumnal colors of New England. The sketch of the corpse, Harry Worp, was done on location by Ferren's wife, Rae Ferren, also a fine artist. Hitchcock and Ferren very much enjoyed collaborating, and as a result of this first project together, he was invited several years later to design the "special sequence" core to the 1958 Hitchcock film Vertigo. The panoramic drawing for the opening credits was done by Saul Steinberg.

Alfred Hitchcock's cameo is a signature occurrence in most of his films. In The Trouble with Harry, he can be seen 22:14 minutes into the film as he walks past a parked limousine while an old man looks at paintings for sale at the roadside stand.

The corpse, Harry Worp, was played by Philip Truex (1911–2008), who was the son of character actor Ernest Truex.

=== Production credits ===
The production credits on the film were as follows:
- Director – Alfred Hitchcock
- Producer – Herbert Coleman (associate producer)
- Writing – John Michael Hayes (screenplay)
- Cinematography – Robert Burks (director of photography)
- Art direction – Hal Pereira and John Goodman (art direction), Sam Comer and Emile Kuri (set decoration)
- Technicolor color consultant – Richard Mueller
- Editor – Alma Macrorie
- Special effects – John P. Fulton (special photographic effects)
- Assistant director – Howard Joslin
- Costumes – Edith Head
- Makeup – Wally Westmore (makeup supervision)
- Sound – Harold Lewis and Winston Leverett (sound recording)
- Musical score – Bernard Herrmann

== Musical score ==
The Trouble with Harry (1998 re-recording) soundtrack

Soundtrack album by Bernard Herrmann
- Released: July 27, 1998
- Recorded: April 29, 1998
- Genre: Soundtrack
- Length: 99 minutes
- Label: Varèse Sarabande
- Director: Joel McNeely
- Producer: Robert Townson

The Trouble with Harry is notable as a landmark in Hitchcock's career as it marked the first of several highly regarded collaborations with composer Bernard Herrmann. In an interview for The New York Times on June 18, 1971, Hitchcock stated that the score was his favorite of all his films. Herrmann rerecorded a new arrangement of highlights from the film's score for Phase 4 Stereo with Herrmann calling the arrangement A Portrait of Hitch.

A song sung by John Forsythe's character, "Flaggin' the Train to Tuscaloosa", was written by Raymond Scott and Mack David. Forsythe is not the performer, however.

A "cash-in" song titled "The Trouble with Harry" was written by Floyd Huddleston with Herb Wiseman and Mark McIntyre. A recording of the song by Ross Bagdasarian Sr. (using the pseudonym of "Alfi & Harry") was released as a single in early 1956, reaching No. 44 on the US Billboard chart and No. 15 on the UK singles chart. A competing version by Les Baxter reached No. 80 on the Billboard chart. The title aside, the record had no connection with the film.

=== 1998 re-recording ===
Originally released on October 3, 1955, the original soundtrack was re-recorded in 1998 and released on CD that same year, under the Varèse Sarabande label. All the original music, composed by Bernard Herrmann, was re-recorded at the City Halls, Glasgow, Scotland, on April 29, 1998, performed by the Royal Scottish National Orchestra, under the direction of Joel McNeely.

The re-recording was originally released on CD in the United Kingdom on July 27, 1998 and in the United States on October 6, 1998. It was later re-released in the UK on May 16, 2014 and in the US on July 21, 2014.

=== Track listing ===
All music is composed by Bernard Herrmann, conducted by Joel McNeely and performed by the Royal Scottish National Orchestra.

The Trouble with Harry (1998 re-recording) soundtrack
No.	Title	Length
1.	"Overture"	1:24
2.	"Autumn"	0:54
3.	"The Murder"	0:56
4.	"The Captain"	1:44
5.	"The Body"	1:24
6.	"Miss Gravely's Test"	0:38
7.	"Jennifer"	0:53
8.	"The Doctor"	1:01
9.	"The Tramp"	1:37
10.	"The Cup"	1:04
11.	"Autumn Afternoon"	0:52
12.	"The Sketch"	1:51
13.	"The Doctor's Return"	1:09
14.	"The Police"	0:47
15.	"The Country Road"	0:53
16.	"Tea Time"	1:40
17.	"The Burial"	1:27
18.	"Waltz Macabre"	1:24
19.	"Waltz Reprise"	0:42
20.	"Valse Lent"	2:21
21.	"Miss Gravely Digs"	0:37
22.	"Homebodies"	1:29
23.	"The Closet"	0:25
24.	"Harvest Eve"	0:45
25.	"The Phantom Coach"	1:09
26.	"The Walk"	0:37
27.	"The Wish"	0:40
28.	"Proposal"	1:13
29.	"Suspicion"	1:01
30.	"Porch Talk"	1:05
31.	"Duo"	1:25
32.	"Ostinato"	1:05
33.	"Encore"	0:47
34.	"Cortege"	0:49
35.	"Slumber"	0:31
36.	"Afterbeats"	0:42
37.	"The Bathtub"	0:40
38.	"Confession"	0:50
39.	"The Solution"	0:54
40.	"Finale"	1:45
Total length:		42:13

== Reception ==
On the review aggregator site Rotten Tomatoes, The Trouble with Harry has an 88% approval rating based on 33 reviews. On Metacritic, which uses a weighted average, the film has a 74 out of 100 score based on reviews from 7 critics, indicating "generally favorable reviews".

The world premiere of The Trouble with Harry was in Vermont (where it was shot), with revenue donated to victims of a recent flood.

Contemporary reviews were middling to positive. Bosley Crowther, in a mixed verdict for The New York Times, wrote: "It is not a particularly witty or clever script that John Michael Hayes has put together from a novel by Jack Trevor Story, nor does Mr. Hitchcock's direction make it spin. The pace is leisurely, almost sluggish, and the humor frequently is strained ... But it does possess mild and mellow merriment all the way. The performers are beguiling in a briskly artificial style, and there's an especially disarming screwball blandness about the manner of Miss MacLaine." Variety called the film "a blithe little comedy" with Edmund Gwenn "a delight" in the lead role. Harrison's Reports called it "a whacky, off-beat type of film, well directed and acted and quite amusing throughout", though the review cautioned that "it may be received with mixed audience reaction" because of the subject matter. Richard L. Coe of The Washington Post called the film "an odd one—sparkling cider spiked with arsenic and a sprig of poison ivy. Although I can recognize its drawbacks, I must confess it almost made me drunk with perverse pleasure." The Monthly Film Bulletin called the film "a comedie noire that brilliantly maintains its precarious balance between humour and bad taste", adding, "The humour is of a quiet and concentrated kind, with the corpse of the troublesome Harry kept persistently in the foreground, and John Michael Hayes' shrewdly witty script affords Hitchcock opportunities for some typically witty macabre and sardonic invention." John McCarten of The New Yorker was negative, writing, "Alfred Hitchcock, whose work has been going steadily downhill ever since he arrived in Hollywood, skids to preposterous depths in 'The Trouble With Harry.'"

The film was a box office disappointment, earning only $3.5 million in the United States. Although the movie was a financial failure in the U.S., it played for a year in England and Rome, and a year and a half in France.

The film rights reverted to Hitchcock following its initial release. It was little shown for nearly 30 years, other than a showing on NBC Saturday Night at the Movies network television broadcast in the early 1960s, though there were some theatrical exhibition in 1963. After protracted negotiations with the Hitchcock estate, Universal Pictures reissued it in 1983, along with Rear Window, Vertigo, and The Man Who Knew Too Much, which in turn led to VHS and eventually DVD and Blu-ray versions for the home video market.

In 2012, Peter Bradshaw of The Guardian called it a "surrealist masterpiece", and claimed it deserves a reappraisal to be considered among Hitchcock's more well-known films such as The Birds, Vertigo, and Psycho.

== In pop culture ==
- "The Trouble with Harry", a 1980 episode of Leave it to Charlie
