= Coco Chanel (film) =

- Promotional poster
- Genre: Biographical; Drama
- Written by: Jeffrey Hatcher; Enrico Medioli; Lea Tafuri
- Screenplay by: James Carrington; Carla Giulia Casalini
- Directed by: Christian Duguay
- Starring: Shirley MacLaine; Malcolm McDowell
- Theme music composer: Andrea Guerra
- Countries of origin: Italy; France; United Kingdom
- Original language: English

Production
- Producers: Luca Bernabei; Matilde Bernabei; Nicolas Traube
- Cinematography: Fabrizio Lucci
- Editor: Alessandro Lucidi
- Running time: 139 minutes
- Production companies: Lux Vide; Rai Fiction; Pampa Production; Alchemy Television

Original release
- Network: Lifetime
- Release: 13 September 2008

Coco Chanel is a 2008 biographical drama television film directed by Christian Duguay and written by Ron Hutchinson, Enrico Medioli and Lea Tafuri. It stars Shirley MacLaine as (the older) Coco Chanel, the pioneering French fashion designer. MacLaine was nominated for a Golden Globe Award, an Emmy and a Screen Actors Guild Award for her work in the film.

Although an Italian-French-British production backed by Rai Uno and France 2, Coco Chanel was primarily intended for the US market, and was first broadcast in the United States on 13 September 2008 by cable channel Lifetime. It premiered in Italy on 5 October 2008 and in France on 29 December 2008. In the United Kingdom, it was first released on DVD, on 6 June 2011. Its first British TV broadcast was on True Entertainment on 7 April 2014.

== Main cast ==
- Shirley MacLaine as Coco Chanel (elder)
- Barbora Bobuľová as Coco Chanel (young)
- Robert Dawson as Lord Fry
- Olivier Sitruk as Arthur "Boy" Capel
- Marine Delterme as Émilienne d'Alençon
- Anny Duperey as Madame Desboutins
- Cosimo Fusco as Albert
- Valentina Lodovini as Adrienne (young)
- Maggie Steed as Adrienne (elder)
- Malcolm McDowell as Marc Bouchier
- Jean-Claude Dreyfus as Paul Poiret
- Sagamore Stévenin as Étienne Balsan
- Cécile Cassel as Gabrielle Dorziat
- Brigitt Christensen as Tsarina Alexandra of Russia
- Vincent Nemeth as Jacques Doucet (fashion designer)

== Home video release ==
On 7 July 2009, Coco Chanel was released on DVD in the Region 1 (US) format.

== Awards and nominations ==
Golden Globe Award
Best Actress – Miniseries or Television Film (MacLaine, nominated)

Screen Actors Guild (SAG)
Outstanding Female Actor – Miniseries or Television Film (MacLaine, nominated)

61st Primetime Emmy Awards
Outstanding Made for Television Movie (Nominated)
Outstanding Lead Actress in a Miniseries or a Movie (MacLaine, nominated)
