= Irma la Douce =

1963 film by Billy Wilder

- Theatrical release poster
- Directed by: Billy Wilder
- Screenplay by: Billy Wilder; I. A. L. Diamond
- Based on: Irma la Douce; 1956 play by Alexandre Breffort
- Produced by: Billy Wilder; Alexandre Trauner (uncredited)
- Starring: Jack Lemmon; Shirley MacLaine
- Cinematography: Joseph LaShelle
- Edited by: Daniel Mandell
- Music by: André Previn
- Production company: The Mirisch Corporation
- Distributed by: United Artists
- Release date: June 5, 1963
- Running time: 147 minutes
- Country: United States
- Language: English
- Budget: $5 million
- Box office: $25.2 million

Irma la Douce (French: [iʁ.ma la dus], "Irma the Sweet") is a 1963 American romantic comedy film directed by Billy Wilder from a screenplay he co-wrote with I. A. L. Diamond, based on the 1956 French stage musical of the same name by Marguerite Monnot and Alexandre Breffort. However, Wilder removed all the songs from the stage version; so while the film is based on a musical, it is not a musical. The film stars Jack Lemmon and Shirley MacLaine.

== Plot ==
Nestor Patou, an honest policeman, has been transferred from the Bois de Boulogne to Les Halles, a more urban neighborhood in Paris. He finds a street full of prostitutes working at the Hotel Casanova and raids the place, arresting the prostitutes and catching his police department's chief at the same time (while not knowing him). The inspector fires Nestor, who is mistakenly framed for bribery and for insubordination.

Kicked off the force and humiliated, Nestor finds himself drawn to the very neighborhood that ended his career with the Paris police—returning to Chez Moustache, a popular tavern for prostitutes and pimps. Down on his luck, Nestor befriends Irma la Douce, a popular prostitute. He reluctantly accepts, as a confidant, the proprietor of Chez Moustache, a man known only as Moustache. In a running joke, Moustache tells of a storied prior life, claiming to have been, among other things, an attorney, a colonel in the Foreign Legion, and a doctor who worked with Albert Schweitzer in Africa, ending with the repeated line, "but that's another story". After saving Irma from her abusive pimp, Hippolyte, Nestor moves in with her and unwittingly becomes Irma's new pimp.

Nestor becomes infatuated and devises a plan to derail Irma's life as a prostitute. With the help of Moustache, Nestor disguises himself as Lord X, a wealthy English lord, who becomes Irma's exclusive client. Lord X has supposedly been rendered impotent by his service in World War II but is eager to support her in exchange for two visits each week. To finance Lord X's expensive habit, Nestor takes graveyard shifts in the marketplace; since he is missing all night and tired all day, Irma suspects an affair.

Irma seduces Lord X and persuades him to take her to England. At that point, Nestor decides to end the charade and kill off his alter ego. Unaware he is being tailed by Hippolyte, he tosses his disguise into the Seine. Seeing Lord X's clothes floating in the water, Hippolyte concludes Nestor killed him.

Arrested and sent to prison, Nestor escapes when he discovers that Irma is pregnant. He narrowly avoids being recaptured when the police search for him at the apartment; donning his old uniform, Nestor blends in with the other police and eludes capture.

With the help of Hippolyte, Nestor arranges for the police to search for him along the Seine, from which he emerges dressed as Lord X. Exonerated of the murder, Nestor and Irma agree to get married. At the church, Irma goes into labor and has their baby. Moustache identifies the real Lord X as a guest. As Lord X leaves, a clearly baffled Moustache looks at the audience.

== Cast ==
- Jack Lemmon as Nestor Patou/Lord X
- Shirley MacLaine as Irma la Douce
- Lou Jacobi as Moustache
- Bruce Yarnell as Hippolyte
- Herschel Bernardi as Inspector Lefevre
- Hope Holiday as Lolita
- Joan Shawlee as Amazon Annie
- Grace Lee Whitney as Kiki the Cossack
- Paul Dubov as André
- Howard McNear as concierge
- Cliff Osmond as police sergeant
- Ruth Earl and Jane Earl as the Zebra twins
- Tura Satana as Suzette Wong
- James Brown as customer from Texas
- Bill Bixby as the tattooed sailor
- John Alvin as customer #2
- Harriette Young as Mimi the MauMau
- Sheryl Deauville as Carmen
- Billy Beck as Officer Dupont
- Edgar Barrier as General Lafayette (uncredited)
- James Caan as the U.S. soldier with radio (uncredited)
- Louis Jourdan as narrator (uncredited)
- Paul Frees as trailer narrator (uncredited)

== Production ==
The film was conceived in 1962 as a vehicle for Marilyn Monroe. The project would have reunited her with Wilder and Lemmon, both of whom had worked with her on Some Like It Hot. After Monroe's death, Shirley MacLaine was cast in the film after starring in The Apartment. MacLaine was paid $350,000 plus a percentage.

While the film was mostly shot at the Samuel Goldwyn Studio in Hollywood, some exteriors were shot around Paris: Les Halles, the church of Saint-Étienne-du-Mont, and the banks of the Seine.

== Reception ==
The film was successful, grossing $25,246,588 in the United States and Canada on a budget of $5 million. It was the fifth highest-grossing film of 1963, earning an estimated $12 million in rentals in the United States and Canada. Irma la Douce earned over $15 million in worldwide rentals, but because of profit participation for Wilder and the two stars, United Artists only made a profit of $440,000 during the film's theatrical run. It was the most popular film of all time in the Netherlands with admissions of 3.6 million.

Bosley Crowther of The New York Times called it "a brisk and bubbly film" with Lemmon "little short of brilliant" and MacLaine having "a wonderously casual and candid air that sweeps indignation before it and leaves one sweetly enamoured of her." Variety praised the "scintillating performances" by Lemmon and MacLaine but thought that the film "lacks the originality of some of Wilder's recent efforts" and that the 147-minute running time was "an awfully long haul for a frivolous farce." Philip K. Scheuer of the Los Angeles Times reported that "I found it a brilliant, though outrageously outspoken comedy." Richard L. Coe of The Washington Post panned the film as "overblown and overlong, two hours and three quarters tediously spent on a single joke." The Monthly Film Bulletin wrote, "Though the film stretches for two and a third hours, and rarely ventures away from the two principals and the studio-built Rue Casanova, the humour and spontaneity endure surprisingly well ... most credit goes to Shirley MacLaine and Jack Lemmon for yet another tour de force of comedy playing." The film has a rating of 76% on Rotten Tomatoes based on 21 reviews.

=== Accolades ===
Year	Award	Category	Recipients and nominees	Results
1963	Academy Awards	Best Original Score	Andre Previn	Won
1963	Academy Awards	Best Cinematography, Color	Joseph LaShelle	Nominated
1963	Academy Awards	Best Actress	Shirley MacLaine	Nominated
1963	Golden Globe Awards	Best Actress – Motion Picture Comedy or Musical	Shirley MacLaine	Won
1963	Golden Globe Awards	Best Actor – Motion Picture Musical or Comedy	Jack Lemmon	Nominated
1963	Golden Globe Awards	Best Motion Picture – Comedy or Musical	Irma la Douce	Nominated
1963	David di Donatello Awards	Best Foreign Actress (Migliore Attrice Straniera)	Shirley MacLaine	Won
1963	Writers Guild of America Awards	Best Comedy Screenplay	Billy Wilder	Nominated
1964	BAFTA Awards	Best Foreign Actress	Shirley MacLaine	Nominated

== Soundtrack ==
Irma La Douce

Soundtrack album by André Previn
- Released: July 13, 1998
- Label: Rykodisc

All compositions by André Previn, using themes by Marguerite Monnot.

1. "Main Title" – 2:14
2. "Meet Irma" – 1:42
3. "This Is the Story" – 3:16
4. "Nestor the Honest Policeman" – 1:54
5. "Our Language of Love" – 2:04
6. "Don't Take All Night" – 5:43
7. "The Market" – 6:28
8. "Easy Living the Hard Way" – 3:16
9. "Escape" – 2:13
10. "Wedding Ring" – 1:35
11. "The Return of Lord X" – 1:24
12. "In the Tub with Fieldglasses" – 2:27
13. "Goodbye Lord X" – 3:17
14. "I'm Sorry Irma" – 1:38
15. "Juke Box: Let's Pretend Love" – 3:07
16. "Juke Box: Look Again" – 2:16
17. "But That's Another Story" – 0:38

The film also features an a cappella enticement song set to the tune of Alouette.

== Remakes ==
- Irma la Douce was remade for French television in 1972.
- The film was remade in Turkey as Kırmızı Fener Sokağı in 1968
- The film was remade in India as the controversial film Manoranjan with Sanjeev Kumar and Zeenat Aman in the roles of Jack Lemmon and Shirley MacLaine.
- The film was remade in Egypt in 1983 as Khamsa Bab (Door Five), with Nadia El Gendy as Tragy, the Irma character.

== Others ==
In 1968, the Egyptian film Afrit Mirati (My Wife's Goblin) starring Salah Zulfikar and Shadia, contained a soundtrack titled Irma la Douce performed by Shadia.

In an interview with CT Music Films, Lol Creme of 10cc stated that Irma La Douce was an influence in their writing of their mini-operetta 'Une Nuit a Paris' which appeared on the band's 3rd album 'The Original Soundtrack'

== See also ==
- List of Egyptian films of 1968
- List of American films of 1963
- Salah Zulfikar on screen, stage and radio
