= Star-Spangled Women for McGovern–Shriver =

1972 benefit concert for George McGovern

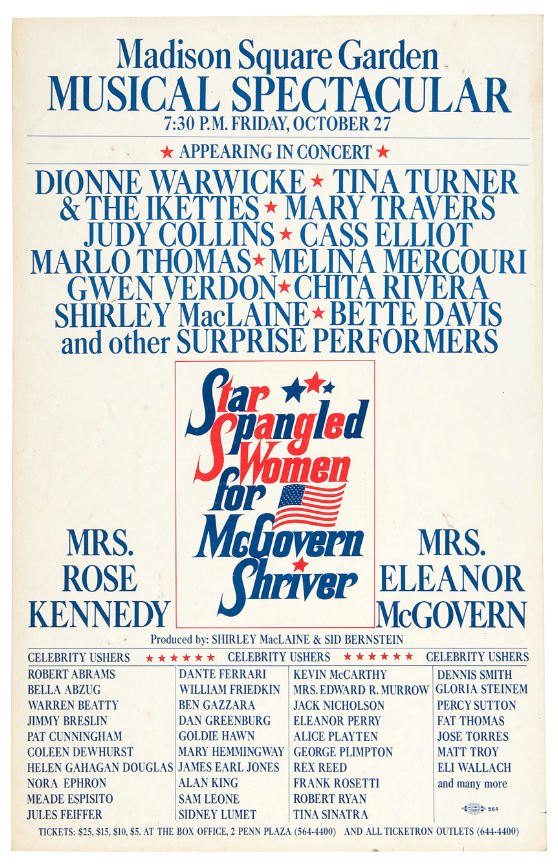
- Date: October 27, 1972
- Venue: Madison Square Garden
- Location: New York City
- Also known as: Star-Spangled Women for McGovern; Star-Spangled Women
- Type: Variety show, fundraiser
- Cause: George McGovern 1972 presidential campaign
- Organised by: Shirley MacLaine; Sid Bernstein
- Participants: Helen Reddy; Dionne Warwicke; Marlo Thomas; Cass Elliot; Gwen Verdon; Chita Rivera; Bette Davis; Melina Mercouri; Tina Turner and the Ikettes; Mary Travers; Judy Collins with Sue Evans; Shirley MacLaine; Linda Hopkins; Rose Kennedy; Eleanor McGovern

Star-Spangled Women for McGovern–Shriver (styled as Star-Spangled Women for McGovern★Shriver) was a political variety show held on October 27, 1972, produced by Shirley MacLaine and Sid Bernstein as a late-campaign push to help the 1972 presidential campaign of George McGovern, running as the peace candidate. Also known as Star-Spangled Women for McGovern and simply Star-Spangled Women, the concert drew a near-capacity crowd at Madison Square Garden in New York City. With a dozen singing, dancing and spoken-word performances, rock journalist Lillian Roxon described the show as "one thunderbolt after another."

Bernstein reported that the event provided the McGovern campaign with $180,000 (equivalent to $1,385,442 in 2025). However, McGovern was not significantly helped by the concert; one week later he was defeated in a landslide by incumbent President Richard Nixon.

== Planning ==
Actress Shirley MacLaine had been campaigning so strongly for McGovern in 1972 that her agent threatened to quit, as she was turning down acting roles in films. She participated in several of the benefit concerts produced by her brother, Warren Beatty, including Four for McGovern in April and Together for McGovern in June.

One of MacLaine's contacts at Madison Square Garden told her that the Republicans had forfeited a block of dates at the arena; they had failed to pay the advance deposit. With October 27 just 2½ weeks away, MacLaine quickly paid for those same dates, reserving them as her own. She determined that she would mount a political variety show with women as featured performers. She began calling performers, and amassed a list of celebrity ushers such as writer Tina Sinatra whose famous father was campaigning for Nixon. MacLaine hoped that Carly Simon would sing but she eventually declined. Actress Marlo Thomas was eager to help McGovern even though Danny Thomas, her father, was a vocal Nixon supporter.

MacLaine called Sid Bernstein to partner with her in producing the show. At this point, only ten days remained before the show date. MacLaine audio-taped an advertisement to play on radio to promote the event. Bernstein secured a 40-piece pit orchestra, and rehearsed the show with a full crew of technicians. Ticketron sold tickets ranging from $5 to $25; also available at the venue box office. MacLaine and Bernstein arranged lodging for the performers and famous guests, and they booked flights to return performers to their regular tour dates. To warm up her celebrity ushers, MacLaine hosted a pre-show cocktail party at Hotel Pennsylvania, across the street. She hustled them out in time for doors.

== Performance ==
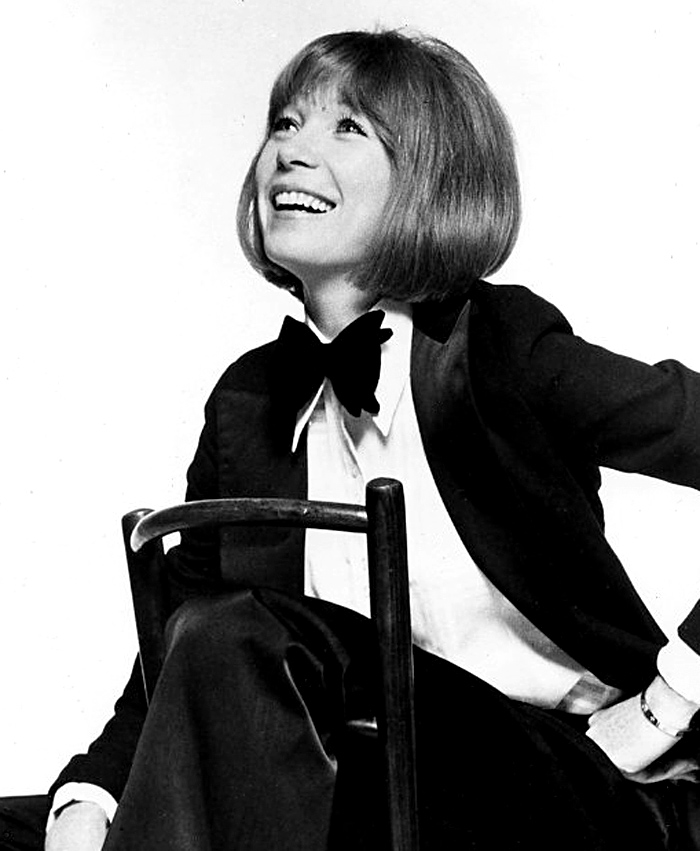
Shirley MacLaine conceived the show, co-produced it, performed at it, and served as emcee

Some 19,000 people began pouring into Madison Square Garden when the doors opened at 7:30 pm. Famous people serving as ushers included Beatty, Helen Gahagan Douglas, James Earl Jones, Gloria Steinem and more. Goldie Hawn and Jack Nicholson had already served twice as ushers at Beatty's political concerts in April and June. Art student Charlie Finch, a volunteer usher, remembers seating Paul Newman and Bella Abzug, even though Abzug was herself an usher.

MacLaine was the master of ceremonies, and she started the show promptly at 8 pm. She remarked about the coming together of so many women, "I'm going to write a book about all of this. It isn't going to be about politics, because that isn't what this is." The first performance was a surprise appearance of Helen Reddy singing "I Am Woman". With the crowd still taking their seats, MacLaine introduced Dionne Warwicke who sang a handful of her Bacharach–David hits and asked everyone to vote for McGovern. Marlo Thomas read a parody excerpt of Erich Segal's Love Story, ending with "Voting for George McGovern means never having to say you're sorry." Gwen Verdon and Chita Rivera headed a team of dancers interpreting numbers from Verdon's Sweet Charity and Rivera's West Side Story. They were joined by Cass Elliot to sing political parody lyrics over pop standards, one of them questioning Nixon's National Security Advisor Henry Kissinger.

Veteran actress Bette Davis sang "They're Either Too Young or Too Old", reprising her role in the 1943 film Thank Your Lucky Stars; she had difficulty reading the words from cue cards so she sang it twice. She also recited song lyrics by Yip Harburg, and received extended applause. Melina Mercouri led a troupe of dancers previewing songs from Lysistrata, a musical soon to open on Broadway. The dancers exited and Mercouri sang her famous song "Never on Sunday". Tina Turner and the Ikettes sang and danced their popular songs in their familiar revue style; music critic Don Beckman said she sounded "just as down‐home funky without [Ike Turner] as she ever had with him." Mary Travers followed with a powerful rendition of "I Wish I Knew How It Would Feel to Be Free", then she had the whole arena join in singing "Blowin' in the Wind". Judy Collins sang and recited poetry by Bertolt Brecht; she was backed by her band which included the only female supporting musician on stage that night, drummer Sue Evans. MacLaine sang and danced in a flashy Las Vegas style. Gospel singer Linda Hopkins brought the house to their feet, dancing along with "Do You Believe", also reported as "That's My Belief". Her appearance was a surprise, but her performance was so engaging that the audience responded with lengthy applause, demanding more, delaying Kennedy family matron Rose Kennedy. Kennedy spoke briefly about the election, then introduced Eleanor McGovern, the wife of the candidate. Eleanor said that McGovern-as-president would restore decency to the country. She said that the voice of the American people should be credited with forcing an end to the Vietnam War.

After 3½ hours of entertainment and politics, the evening concluded with a singalong of "America the Beautiful", led by Steinem, Kennedy, Travers and Turner. Warwicke was already at the airport by this time, on her way to Wichita for her next gig. Turner and the Ikettes left quickly, as they were flying to Boston for another Ike and Tina Revue date.

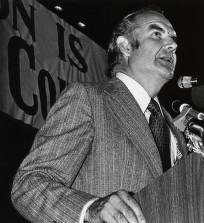
George McGovern, 1972

== Legacy ==
Richard Nixon had been undermining McGovern's anti-war platform by falsely announcing a withdrawal from the Vietnam War. McGovern said in October that this maneuver was a deceitful "ploy".

On election night, MacLaine was in Sioux Falls, South Dakota, with the McGovern entourage. She was eating dinner at a Mexican restaurant with consultant Bob Shrum and journalist Pete Hamill, thinking there was plenty of time, when they heard that the television news media was already calling victory for Nixon. With so many Americans wanting to believe him, Nixon had won the race in a landslide. Six weeks later, Nixon ordered the bombing of Hanoi – an escalation of the war. Historian Jon Wiener said, "I remember election night, 1972, as like the worst night in American politics in my life. Here was this stark choice between war and peace, truth and lies, and the American people rushed to embrace war and lies."

MacLaine later estimated that she had spent $250,000 of her own money on the 1972 campaign, equivalent to $1,924,000 in 2025, paying for extensive travel, lodging, meals, parties, and innumerable organizational details. She also turned down offers of film work, significantly reducing her income that year.
