= Live Concert at the Forum =

Live album by Barbra Streisand
- Released: October 1, 1972
- Recorded: April 15, 1972
- Venue: The Forum (Inglewood, California)
- Genre: Pop
- Length: 41:05
- Label: Columbia
- Producer: Richard Perry

Barbra Streisand chronology
Barbra Joan Streisand (1971)	Live Concert at the Forum (1972)	Barbra Streisand...and Other Musical Instruments (1973)

Singles from Live Concert at the Forum
- 1. "Sweet Inspiration / Where You Lead" Released: May 25, 1972; 2. "Sing / Make Your Own Kind of Music" Released: August 1972; 3. "Didn't We" Released: November 1972

Live Concert at the Forum is the second live album by American singer Barbra Streisand, released physically on October 1, 1972, by Columbia Records. Produced by long-time collaborator Richard Perry, it was recorded at The Forum in Inglewood, part of Greater Los Angeles, on April 15, 1972, during Four for McGovern, a concert held in benefit for George McGovern's 1972 presidential campaign. A CD version of Live Concert at the Forum was released on September 6, 1989.

The concert setlist and between-song patter was brought forward from Streisand's December 1971 – January 1972 residency at the Las Vegas Hilton. Streisand's medley of "Sweet Inspiration" and "Where You Lead", medley of "Sing" and "Make Your Own Kind of Music", and "Didn't We" were released as the album's three singles, all throughout 1972. The lead single was nominated for Best Female Pop Vocal Performance at the 15th Annual Grammy Awards in 1973. Music critics responded well to the album, with many commending Streisand's strong vocal performance. Commercially, Live Concert at the Forum peaked at numbers 17 and 19 on the album charts in Canada and the United States, respectively, and received a Platinum certification from the Recording Industry Association of America for shipments exceeding one million copies.

== Background ==
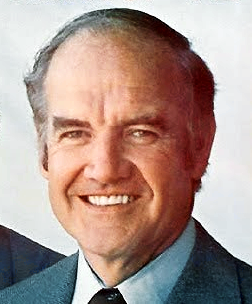
George McGovern as seen on a 1972 campaign poster

Her first live album since 1968's A Happening in Central Park, Barbra Streisand released her second one, Live Concert at the Forum, on October 1, 1972. The album's songs were recorded during Streisand's segment of the Four for McGovern concert held on April 15, 1972, at The Forum indoor arena in Inglewood. Superstar singers Carole King, James Taylor and Streisand headlined the concert along with Quincy Jones and his Orchestra. The concert was a benefit for George McGovern's 1972 presidential campaign. Tickets for the performance ranged in price from $5.50 to $100.00 and the event itself grossed over $300,000; however, after covering the expenses for the show, McGovern's campaign only received approximately $18,000 in donations. In a mock warning on the evils of weed, Streisand lit up a joint during one of her songs and pretended she was under the influence of marijuana while performing.

Richard Perry produced the album's 11 tracks, most of which are selections taken from previous works in Streisand's music catalog. Arrangements for the songs were headed by Don Costa, Don Hannah, Peter Matz, Claus Ogerman and Gene Page. David Shire served as the conductor on Live Concert at the Forum and Eddie Kendricks was Streisand's vocal director.

== Singles ==
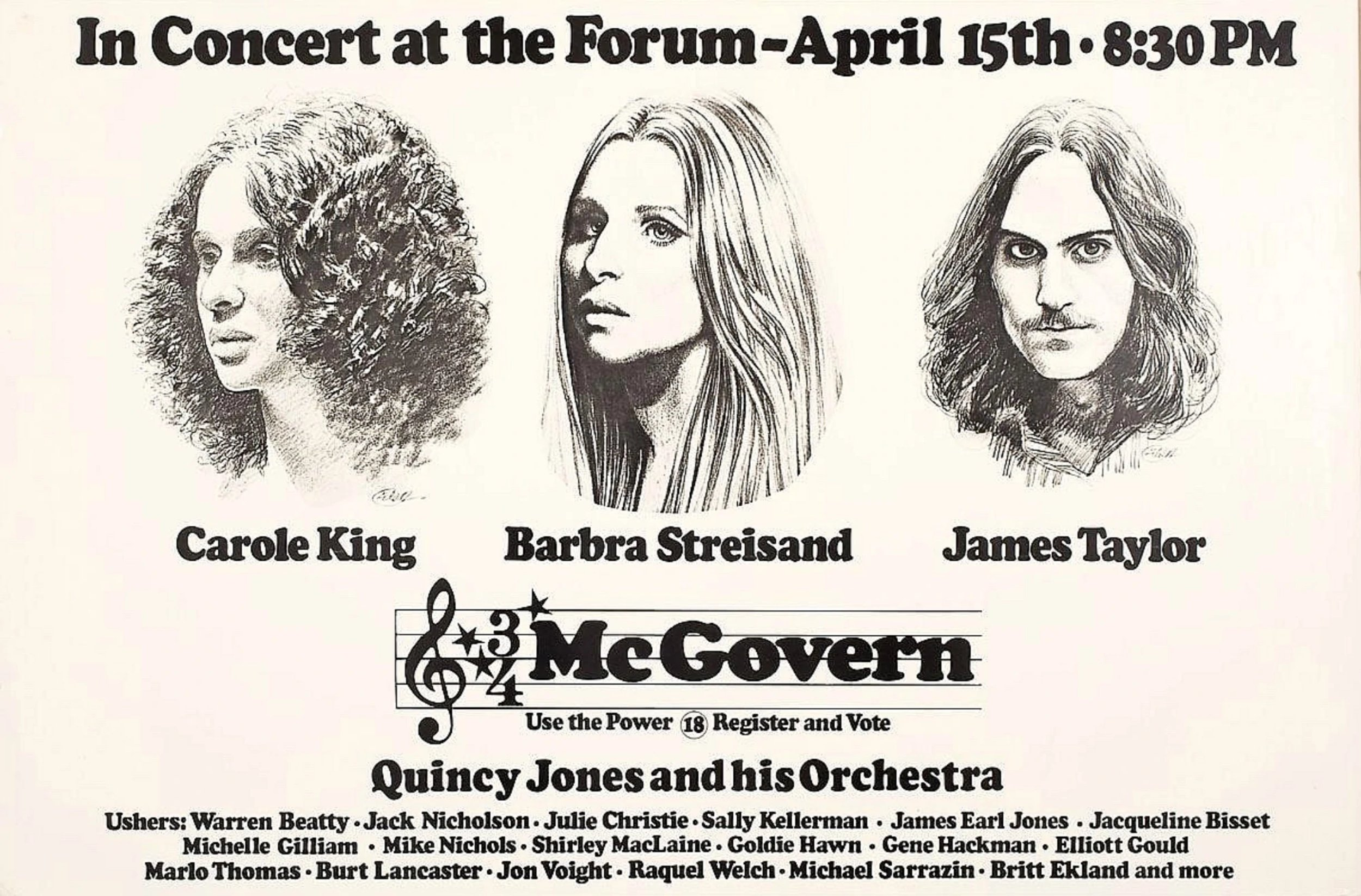
Concert flyer: Four for McGovern

Three singles were released from Live Concert at the Forum throughout 1972. The medley of "Sweet Inspiration" and "Where You Lead" was released as the album's lead single on May 25, 1972, on 7-inch vinyl with B-side track "Didn't We". The four female Eddie Kendricks singers – Venetta Fields, Marti McCall, Geraldine Jones and Clydie King – are heard prominently on backing vocals. This medley was the most commercially successful single on Live Concert at the Forum, peaking at number 37 in both the United States and Canada. In addition to being nominated at the 15th Annual Grammy Awards for Best Female Pop Vocal Performance, Streisand would later feature this live rendition on her second greatest hits album, Barbra Streisand's Greatest Hits Volume 2 (1978).

Her medley of "Sing" and "Make Your Own Kind of Music" served as the album's second single in August 1972 and was paired with her live performance of "Starting Here, Starting Now" as the B-side. It reached number 94 on the Billboard Hot 100 and entered the lower positions of the Adult Contemporary charts in both Canada and the United States.

Streisand's version of "Didn't We" was released as the album's third and final single in November 1972. Columbia Records distributed the single on 7-inch vinyl alongside B-side track "On a Clear Day You Can See Forever". According to Julian Coleman of Billboard, the cover was popular on soul radio and was frequently on rotation for airplay. Her rendition peaked at number 82 on the Billboard Hot 100 and on the Adult Contemporary charts in the United States and Canada, it reached numbers 22 and 46, respectively.

== Reception ==
Professional ratings
Review scores
Source	Rating
AllMusic	3/5 stars
Rolling Stone	(Positive)

Live Concert at the Forum received a positive response from music critics. William Ruhlmann from AllMusic awarded the album three out of five stars, enjoying the noticeable differences of "how much her music ha[s] changed since her first [live album] had been released four years before". Singling out her performances of "People" and "Stoney End", he noted that they both "demonstrate Streisand's versatility" as a musician. Ruhlmann also complimented her vocals, acknowledged her "powerful delivery", and enjoyed her commentary during the monologue, finding it to be "as dated as it was timely in 1972". Also singling out Streisand's vocal delivery, Rolling Stone's Jon Landau wrote that "there is something about that big, beautiful, instantly recognizable voice singing in front of a strictly pro big band that casts a shadow over the material"; describing it as a pop record, he called "On a Clear Day (You Can See Forever)" the album's best track and felt that the album's "shortcomings never really seem to matter".

In the United States, the album debuted at number 100 on the Billboard 200 for the week ending November 18, 1972. On January 6 of the following year, Live Concert at the Forum peaked at number 19. The Recording Industry Association of America certified the live album Gold for shipments upwards of 500,000 sales on February 13, 1973, and upgraded the certification to Platinum for shipments of one million on November 21, 1986. In Canada, where the album was released under the title Barbra Streisand Live, it peaked at a slightly higher position. The record debuted on the list, compiled by RPM, at number 94 on December 2, 1972, and during the following month it would peak at number 17. According to the liner notes of Barbra's retrospective box set: Just for the Record... (1991), the album also received a record certification in Canada.

== Track listing ==
All songs are executively produced by Richard Perry.

Live Concert at the Forum – Standard edition
No.	Title	Writer(s)	Length
1.	"Sing / Make Your Own Kind of Music"	Joe Raposo; Barry Mann; Cynthia Weil	4:23
2.	"Starting Here, Starting Now"	Richard Maltby Jr.; David Shire	2:45
3.	"Don't Rain on My Parade"	Bob Merrill; Jule Styne	2:40
4.	"Monologue" (Dialogue)		3:12
5.	"On a Clear Day (You Can See Forever)"	Alan Jay Lerner; Burton Lane	1:56
6.	"Sweet Inspiration / Where You Lead"	Dan Penn; Spooner Oldham; Carole King; Toni Stern	6:19
7.	"Didn't We"	Jimmy Webb	3:12
8.	"My Man"	Jacques Charles; Channing Pollack; Albert Willemetz; Maurice Yvain	4:34
9.	"Stoney End"	Laura Nyro	3:06
10.	"Sing / Happy Days Are Here Again"	Raposo; Milton Ager; Jack Yellen	5:30
11.	"People"	Merrill	3:28
Total length:			41:05

Live Concert at the Forum – 8-track cartridge edition
No.	Title	Length
1.	"Sing / Make Your Own Kind of Music"	4:23
2.	"Starting Here, Starting Now"	2:45
3.	"Don't Rain on My Parade"	2:40
4.	"Monologue" (Part 1)	1:28
5.	"Monologue" (Conclusion)	1:35
6.	"On a Clear Day You Can See Forever"	1:56
7.	"Sweet Inspiration / Where You Lead"	6:19
8.	"Didn't We"	3:12
9.	"My Man"	4:34
10.	"Stoney End" (Part 1)	2:01
11.	"Stoney End" (Conclusion)	1:08
12.	"Sing / Happy Days Are Here Again"	5:30
13.	"People"	3:28
Total length:		41:09

== Personnel ==
Credits adapted from the liner notes of the standard edition of Live Concert at the Forum.

- Barbra Streisand – vocals
- David Shire – conductor of the orchestra provided by Quincy Jones
- Joe Sample – piano
- Tommy Check – Drums
- Ray Neopolitan – Bass
- Eddie Kendricks – vocal director
  - Venetta Fields, Marti McCall, Geraldine Jones, Clydie King – backing vocals
- Don Costa – arranging (track 2)
- Don Hannah – arranging (tracks 1, 6, 10)
- Peter Matz – arranging (tracks 3, 5, 8, 11)
- Claus Ogerman – arranging (track 7)
- Gene Page – arranging (track 9)
- Richard Perry – producer
- Bill Schnee – engineering
- Customatrix – mastering
- Bobby Bryant – Trumpet
- John Andino – Trumpet
- Chuck Findley – Trumpet
- Paul Hubinon – Trumpet
- Sweets Edison – Trumpet
- Jimmy Cleveland – Trombone
- George Bohanon – Trombone
- Lew McCreary – Trombone
- Dick Hyde – Trombone
- Tommy Johnson – Tuba
- Bill Green – Saxes
- Ernie Watts – Saxes
- Jerome Richardson – Saxes
- Tom Scott – Saxes
- Jim Horn – Saxes
- Paul Humphrey – Drums
- Bobbye Hall Porter – Percussion
- Gary Coleman – Percussion
- Clarence McDonald – Piano
- Ray Brown – Bass
- Chuck Rainey – Bass
- Lou Morrell – Guitar
- David T Walker – Guitar
- Dean Parks – Guitar
- Stella Castellucci – Harp
- Bill Henshaw – French Horn
- Janice Gower, Henry Roth, Joe Stepansky, William Henderson, Bob Barene, Arnold Belnick, Blanche Belnick, Jack Schulman – Violin
- David Campbell, Rollice Dale – Viola
- Emmet Sargeant, Ann Goodman – Cello

== Charts ==
Chart (1972–1973)	Peak position
Canada Top Albums/CDs (RPM)	17
US Billboard 200	19

== Certifications ==
Region	Certification	Certified units/sales
United States (RIAA)	Platinum	1,000,000^{^}
^{^} Shipments figures based on certification alone.
