= Didn't We (Richard Harris song) =

1968 song by Richard Harris

Single by Richard Harris

from the album A Tramp Shining
- B-side: "In the Final Hours"; "Paper Chase"; "My Boy"
- Released: 1968
- Genre: Traditional pop
- Length: 2:24
- Label: Dunhill
- Songwriter: Jimmy Webb
- Producer: Jimmy Webb

Richard Harris singles chronology
"The Yard Went on Forever" (1968)	"Didn't We" (1968)	"A Tramp Shining" (1969)

"Didn't We" is a song recorded by Irish singer and actor Richard Harris for his debut studio album, A Tramp Shining (1968). It was written and produced by Jimmy Webb and originally recorded by James Darren; his version reached number 36 on the Billboard Easy Listening chart in August, 1967. Harris' recording served as the B-side to his 1968 single "MacArthur Park". "Didn't We" was then distributed as a single by Dunhill Records in 1969. A traditional pop song, Harris sings about his life in the past. Commercially, it charted at lower positions of both the United States and Canada, and in the higher ranks of their Adult Contemporary component charts. Harris featured "Didn't We" on several of his greatest hits albums, including The Richard Harris Collection: His Greatest Performances from 1973. That same year, the song was reissued as a promotional single paired alongside his 1971 single "My Boy".

American vocalist Barbra Streisand recorded a version of "Didn't We" in 1972 for her second live album, Live Concert at the Forum. It was originally performed at Four for McGovern, a concert benefitting George McGovern's ultimately unsuccessful 1972 presidential campaign. Streisand's monologue before and after the performance consisted of her acting as if she had taken marijuana. Her version peaked at number 82 in the United States, and also entered the Adult Contemporary charts in both the aforementioned country and Canada. She has since included an earlier version of "Didn't We" on her 2012 compilation album, Release Me. Other artists like Matt Monro and Frank Sinatra also recorded renditions of "Didn't We". Dionne Warwick recorded "Didn't We" for her 1970 album I'll Never Fall in Love Again.

== Background and composition ==
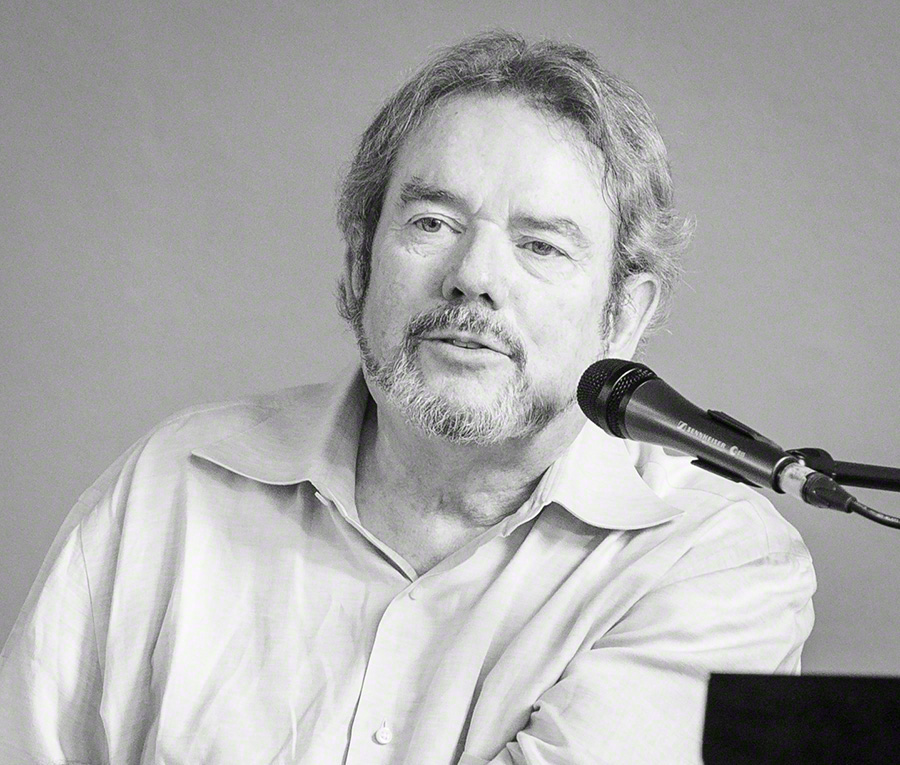
Jimmy Webb solely wrote and produced "Didn't We".

"Didn't We" was originally featured as the B-side track to Harris's 1968 single "MacArthur Park". That same year, it was distributed as a standalone 7" record, serving as the second single from his debut studio album, A Tramp Shining (1968). Various formats exist, all of them including "Didn't We" as the A-side track; the United Kingdom release features "In the Final Hours" while the United States version has "Paper Chase" instead. It was reissued as a promotional single in 1973 and features Harris's 1971 single "My Boy". It was written and produced by Jimmy Webb, who Harris had collaborated previously with.

A traditional pop recording, "Didn't We" is written in the key of C major with Harris's vocals ranging from E_{4} to G_{5}; it is accompanied by the instrumentation of a piano and a guitar. Lyrically, Harris recalls the past and opens the single by singing, "This time we almost made the pieces fit / Didn't we girl?".

== Reception ==
AllMusic's Matthew Greenwald acclaimed the production of "Didn't We". He stated that it is "home to one of Jimmy Webb's most enduring melodies" and described its arrangement as elegant. In the 24 May 1969 edition of Billboard, an editor recognized "Didn't We" in the "Special Merit Spotlight" column, where the publication reports designated singles "deserving [of] special attention". The critic noted its potential "sales appeal" and singled out its programming as a highlight. Michael Feeney Callan, the author of a biography for Harris, wrote that the composition was one of the singer's more "intimate [and] orchestral tracks".

In mid 1969, "Didn't We" managed to chart on the major record charts in both the United States and Canada. On the Billboard Hot 100, it debuted at number 83 for the week ending June 7, 1969, becoming the week's highest new entry. Five weeks later, the single reached its peak position at number 63 and then departed the chart altogether the following week. On Canada's Top Singles compiled by RPM, it entered the chart at number 95 on June 16 of the same year, before rising to number 82 the following week and number 73 the week after that. It also peaked on the Adult Contemporary charts in both the United States and Canada, reaching positions 11 and nine, respectively.

== Cover versions and other usage ==
Several recording artists and musicians have covered "Didn't We". An early one was American singer Frank Sinatra's rendition, which appeared on his 27th studio album, My Way (1969), to which Stephen Thomas Erlewine from AllMusic likened it as a "rock cover". O. C. Smith released a version of the song for his 1969 album, O.C. Smith at Home. Former Temptations falsetto crooner Eddie Kendricks recorded a version of this ballad, which was the closing track to his 1971 debut album, All By Myself. New Zealand singer Bunny Walters recorded a version which appeared as the B side of his 1971 single "Brandy". English singer Matt Monro recorded a version for his 1973 album for The Present (reissued in 2004 as the double album For the Present / The Other Side of the Stars). Peggy Lee recorded a version that was released as a bonus track on a 2008 CD reissue of her 1970 album Make It with You. As a tribute to Webb, Michael Feinstein placed it on his 25th studio album, Only One Life: The Songs of Jimmy Webb (2003). Music critic Aaron Litham, also from AllMusic, acclaimed it and wrote, "The quiet piano strains and Feinstein's reflective vocals tenderly deliver the song's bittersweet meaning as if being recorded for the very first time."

"Didn't We" is featured on several of Harris's greatest hits albums. It was initially included on his first one, titled The Richard Harris Collection: His Greatest Performances, which was released in 1973 by Dunhill. It also served as the opener and prelude on his second album in the series, The Webb Sessions: 1968-1969 (1995), released exclusively in Australia. The aforementioned album was re-released in the United Kingdom under the name MacArthur Park: Richard Harris Sings the Songs of Jimmy Webb in 1997. "Didn't We" also appears on a collection of his singles, titled MacArthur Park (1972), released under the budget album label Music for Pleasure.

== Track listings and formats ==
UK commercial 7" single

- A1 "Didn't We" – 2:24
- B1 "In the Final Hours" – 2:45

UK promotional reissued 7" single

- A1 "Didn't We" – 2:24
- B1 "My Boy" – 3:16

US commercial 7" single

- A1 "Didn't We" – 2:24
- B1 "Paper Chase" – 2:15

== Charts ==
Chart (1969)	Peak position
Canada Top Singles (RPM)	73
Canada Adult Contemporary (RPM)	9
US Billboard Hot 100	63
US Adult Contemporary (Billboard)	11

== Barbra Streisand version ==
"Didn't We"
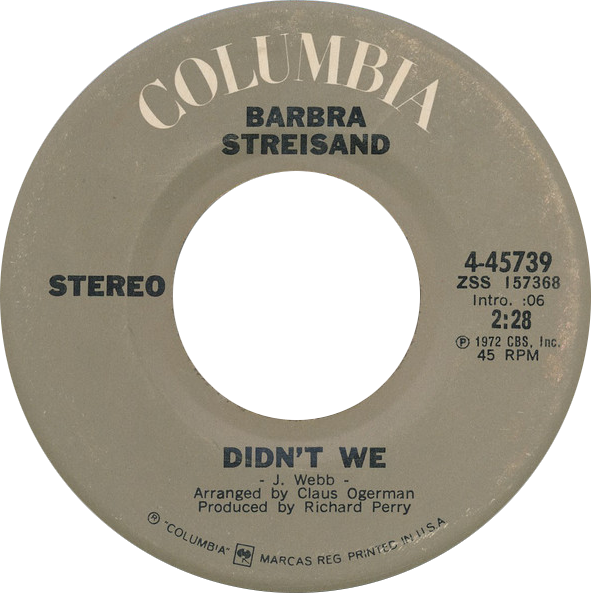
- Side A of the US retail single

Single by Barbra Streisand

from the album Live Concert at the Forum
- B-side: "On a Clear Day (You Can See Forever)"
- Released: November 1972
- Recorded: 15 April 1972
- Venue: The Forum (Inglewood, CA)
- Length: 2:28
- Label: Columbia
- Songwriter: Jimmy Webb
- Producer: Richard Perry

Barbra Streisand singles chronology
"Sing / Make Your Own Kind of Music" (1972)	"Didn't We" (1972)	"If I Close My Eyes" (1973)

=== Background and reception ===
American vocalist Barbra Streisand recorded a version of "Didn't We" for her second live album, Live Concert at the Forum (1972). It was released as the record's third and final single and was recorded at Streisand's first concert in six years, titled "Barbra-Live!", on 15 April 1972. It was held at The Forum in Inglewood, California; the event itself served as a concert to raise money for George McGovern's 1972 presidential campaign. To warn the public on the misuse of drugs and alcohol, the singer pretended as if she was under the influence of marijuana. Richard Perry produced this version while Claus Ogerman helped with the arrangements. The vinyl single release features the B-side track "On a Clear Day (You Can See Forever)", while the promotional release has the same A-side and B-side.

Allison J. Waldman, author of The Barbra Streisand Scrapbook, wrote that Streisand's performance of the single was "heartbreaking", while Linda Pohly, writer of The Barbra Streisand Companion, felt as if it revealed her "slender musical frame" that can both "support or sustain".

=== Chart performance ===
"Didn't We" did not match the moderate commercial success that Harris's version was met with. However, it was heavily played on soul radio, according to Julian Coleman of Billboard. In the United States, it entered the Billboard Hot 100 on 9 December 1972, where it was placed at number 98. It increased its peak position slowly, reaching number 96 the following week, and stalling at number 95 for the next two weeks after that. Streisand's rendition finally reached its peak position on 20 January 1973, where it was ranked at number 82 on the Hot 100. It spent a total of eight weeks on the United States' chart, before dropping off at its final position on 27 January 1973, also at number 82. It also entered both of the Adult Contemporary charts in the United States and Canada (then titled the Easy Listening chart in the former country), peaked at numbers 22 and 46, respectively.

=== Promotion and other usage ===
Streisand sang "Didn't We" during her 2012-2013 concert tour, Barbra Live. It was performed immediately after her 1963 rendition of "Bewitched, Bothered and Bewildered" and before Charlie Chaplin's 1936 single "Smile". The song then appeared on her eighth live album, Back to Brooklyn (2013), and the accompanying DVD release of the same name. Streisand also included an earlier version of "Didn't We" on her compilation album, Release Me, released in 2012. The record itself is a collection of rare and previously unreleased songs from Streisand's catalogue.

=== Track listings ===
Standard edition 7" single

- A1 "Didn't We" – 2:28
- B1 "On a Clear Day (You Can See Forever)" – 2:08

Promotional 7" single

- A1 "Didn't We" – 2:28
- B1 "Didn't We" – 2:28

=== Charts ===
Chart (1973)	Peak position
Canada Adult Contemporary (RPM)	46
US Billboard Hot 100	82
US Adult Contemporary (Billboard)	22
US Cashbox Top 100 Singles	65
