= Four for McGovern =

Political benefit concert

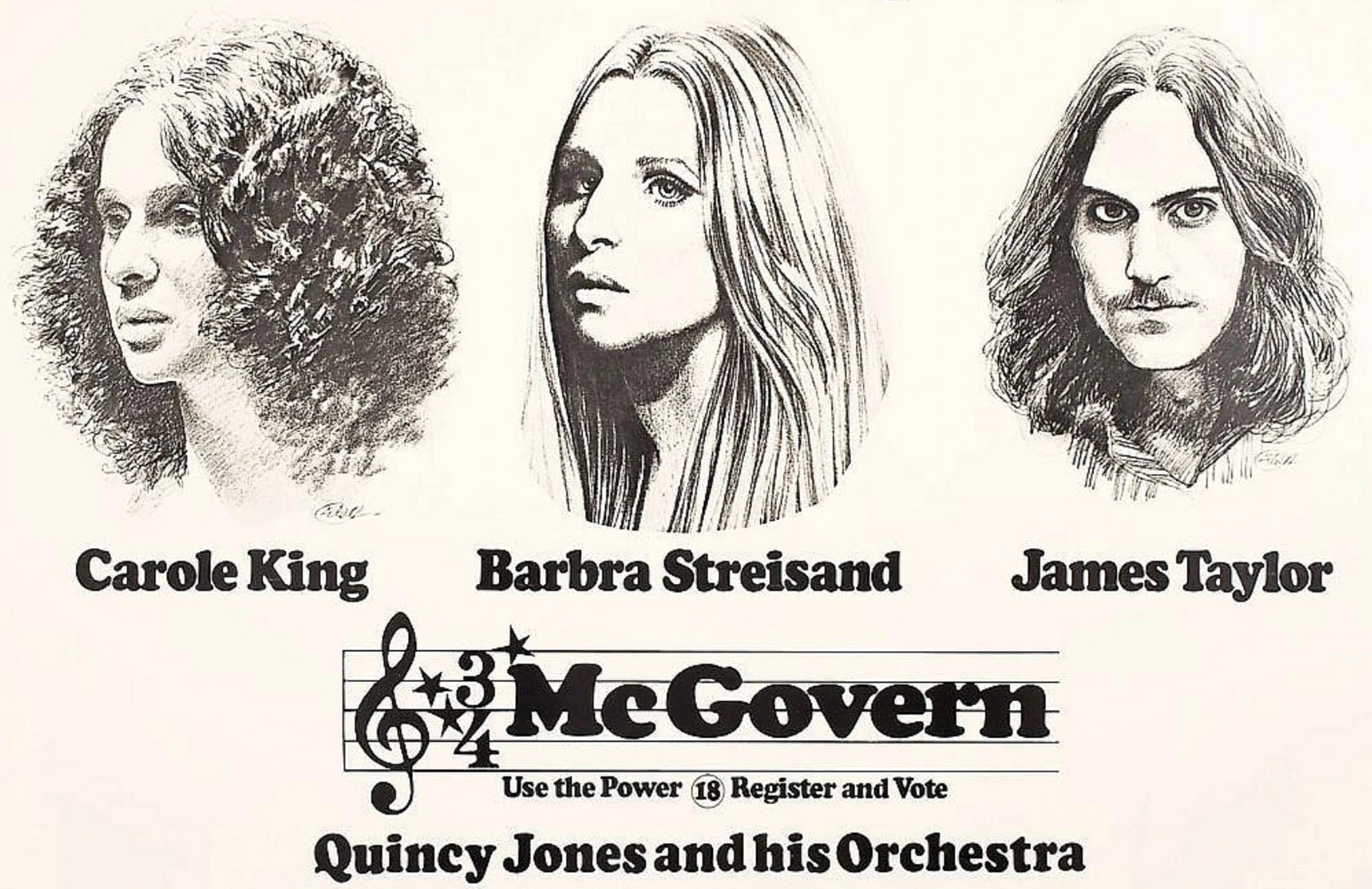
- Concert flyer with caricature sketches
- Date: April 15, 1972
- Venue: The Forum
- Location: Inglewood, California
- Also known as: 3/4 McGovern
- Type: Benefit concert, fundraiser
- Cause: George McGovern 1972 presidential campaign
- Organised by: Warren Beatty (executive); Lou Adler (sponsor); Jim Rissmiller (The Forum)
- Participants: Carole King; Barbra Streisand; James Taylor; Quincy Jones and his Orchestra

Four for McGovern, also known as 3/4 McGovern, was a benefit concert held on April 15, 1972, produced by actor Warren Beatty to assist the 1972 presidential campaign of George McGovern, running as the anti-war candidate. The concert, held at The Forum in Greater Los Angeles, featured performances by Carole King, James Taylor, Quincy Jones and his Orchestra, and Barbra Streisand. Streisand's performance was audio-taped to create the album Live Concert at the Forum, released on October 1.

The concert was attended by 18,000 people, with 16,000 in the permanent arena seating paying $4 to $10 per seat, and another 2,000 in temporary seats set up on the arena floor, paying $100 each. It was widely reported that $300,000 or even $320,000 had been raised for the cause, but after expenses were tallied, only about $18,000 (equivalent to $139,000 in 2025) was given to McGovern's campaign.

Although King and Taylor were at the top of their fame, it was Streisand who was acclaimed the star of the evening. She had the audience in her control the whole time, and received standing ovations at the end. McGovern was not significantly helped by the concert; he went on to lose in a landslide to Richard Nixon in November 1972. Streisand's album performed well in the marketplace, rising to number 19 on the Billboard 200, and staying on the charts for 27 weeks.

== Preparation ==
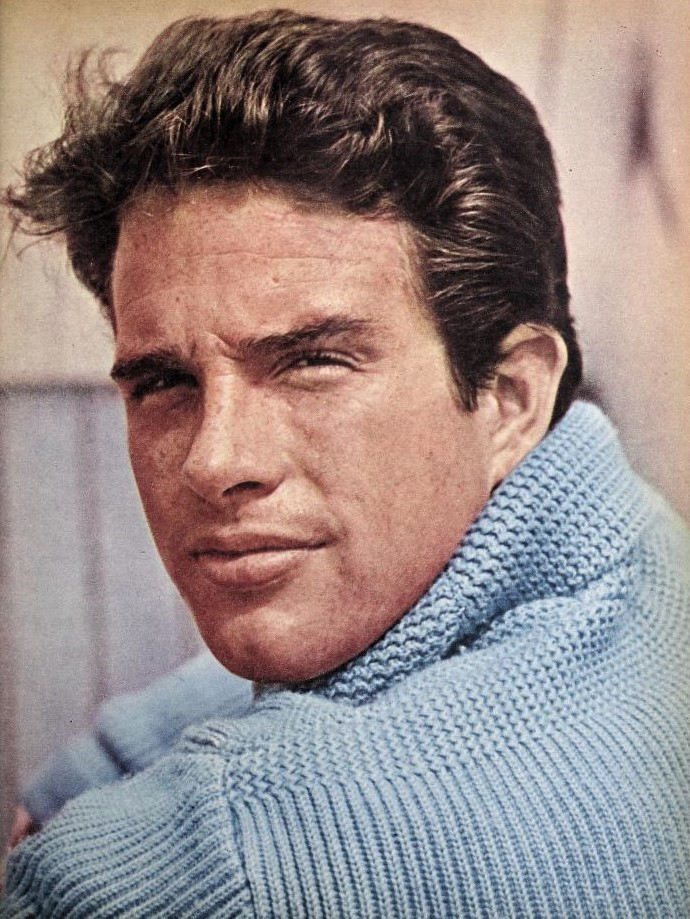
Actor Warren Beatty produced the concert

Warren Beatty came up with the idea of the concert in early April 1972 while he was at his residence in the Beverly Wilshire Hotel. He got Barbra Streisand to agree by phone, and then Carole King. King called James Taylor to give the concert three big names. Record executive Lou Adler came forward to sponsor the event. King had recently won four Grammy Awards, including her song "You've Got a Friend" performed by Taylor, who picked up his first Grammy for it. He had also seen recent success with his album Mud Slide Slim certified Gold a year earlier. Streisand was expected to draw a crowd because of her reputation as an entertainer. To add to the star-studded evening, Warren called a number of celebrities who would serve as ushers. On April 7, tickets went on sale, and they were sold out in 18 hours.

The event was conceived as three singers performing for McGovern, to be called "3/4 McGovern", pronounced Three for McGovern. Taylor said that the title was made to look like a time signature, with stacked numerals – 3/4 – which indicates triple meter. The initial publicity announced the concert as "Three for McGovern". For her segment, Streisand decided to reproduce her recent Las Vegas show, which required an orchestra. She found that Quincy Jones was willing to bring his orchestra. Jones was acknowledged as sharing star billing, and the event became Four for McGovern. Matt Goldbach in charge of McGovern's California campaign activities expressed his wish that the event should be a political rally with speeches, while some Hollywood celebrities thought it should be more like the Academy Awards ceremony, but the performers had already decided on a purely musical concert. One concession was made to Goldbach: the ushers would hand out donation envelopes.

Four portable dressing room trailers were rented by producer/promoter Jim Rissmiller for the four star performers, to provide more privacy than the basketball and hockey locker room facilities in The Forum. Security for the event involved the usual Wells Fargo guards, augmented this time with 24 athletes from the UCLA Bruins football program. A plexiglass stage set was assembled for Streisand, the one that had been used for her December 1971 – January 1972 show at the Las Vegas Hilton. The stage was dressed with one banner bearing the name "McGovern" on it, displayed on the front fascia, below the performers. Much of the audio equipment was provided by Showco including stage monitors; Showco had supported James Taylor's touring needs throughout the previous year. McCune Sound brought a proprietary new loudspeaker system, the JM-3, designed by Bob Cavin and John Meyer, with speaker positions and coverage determined by Abe Jacob. For Streisand's set, a mobile recording truck was parked near the stage and wired to the microphone splitter. At 11 am on the day of the show, Taylor briefly rehearsed, followed by King who was recuperating from strep throat and was taking it easy. Jones rehearsed his big band in a large snack bar area upstairs. The orchestra moved to the stage at 2 pm. The lyrics to Streisand's songs were written on the stage floor as a memory aid. At 3 pm, Streisand began rehearsing with the orchestra, and she worked the songs with determination. She was still rehearsing at 6 pm when a few celebrity ushers arrived. Photographer Steve Schapiro said that Streisand's voice at rehearsal was "magnificent" even though she had not been singing for six weeks.

Serving the $100 seating section, celebrity ushers were announced ahead of time: "Warren Beatty, Jack Nicholson, Julie Christie, Sally Kellerman, James Earl Jones, Jacqueline Bisset, Michelle Gillian, Mike Nichols, Shirley MacLaine, Goldie Hawn, Gene Hackman, Elliott Gould, Marlo Thomas, Burt Lancaster, Jon Voight, Raquel Welch, Michael Sarrazin, Britt Ekland and more." Beatty was the producer of the event, and he spent most of his time backstage tending to details rather than serving as usher. The New York Times found Nicholson working as an usher, and quoted him saying, "most of our political involvement is very superficial, including my own... It is no crime to support the best man.” When Hackman was asked about further McGovern campaigning, he said, "I don’t know what more I can do. I contributed to the campaign. I’m here tonight. If McGovern wins the California primary I guess I’ll work with Warren [Beatty] some more." The Village Voice reported additional ushers: Robert Vaughn, John Phillip Law, Peggy Lipton, "Mama" Cass Elliot and Michelle Phillips. Audience members included Carly Simon, Joni Mitchell, Gregory Peck and his wife Veronique. The Detroit Free Press noticed Rob Reiner and Penny Marshall were among the first attendees to arrive. Reiner said, "McGovern's not the perfect candidate... But he's the closest." Cass Elliot was seen handing guests the contribution envelopes, saying "Give us some money and we'll give you a country."

== Concert ==
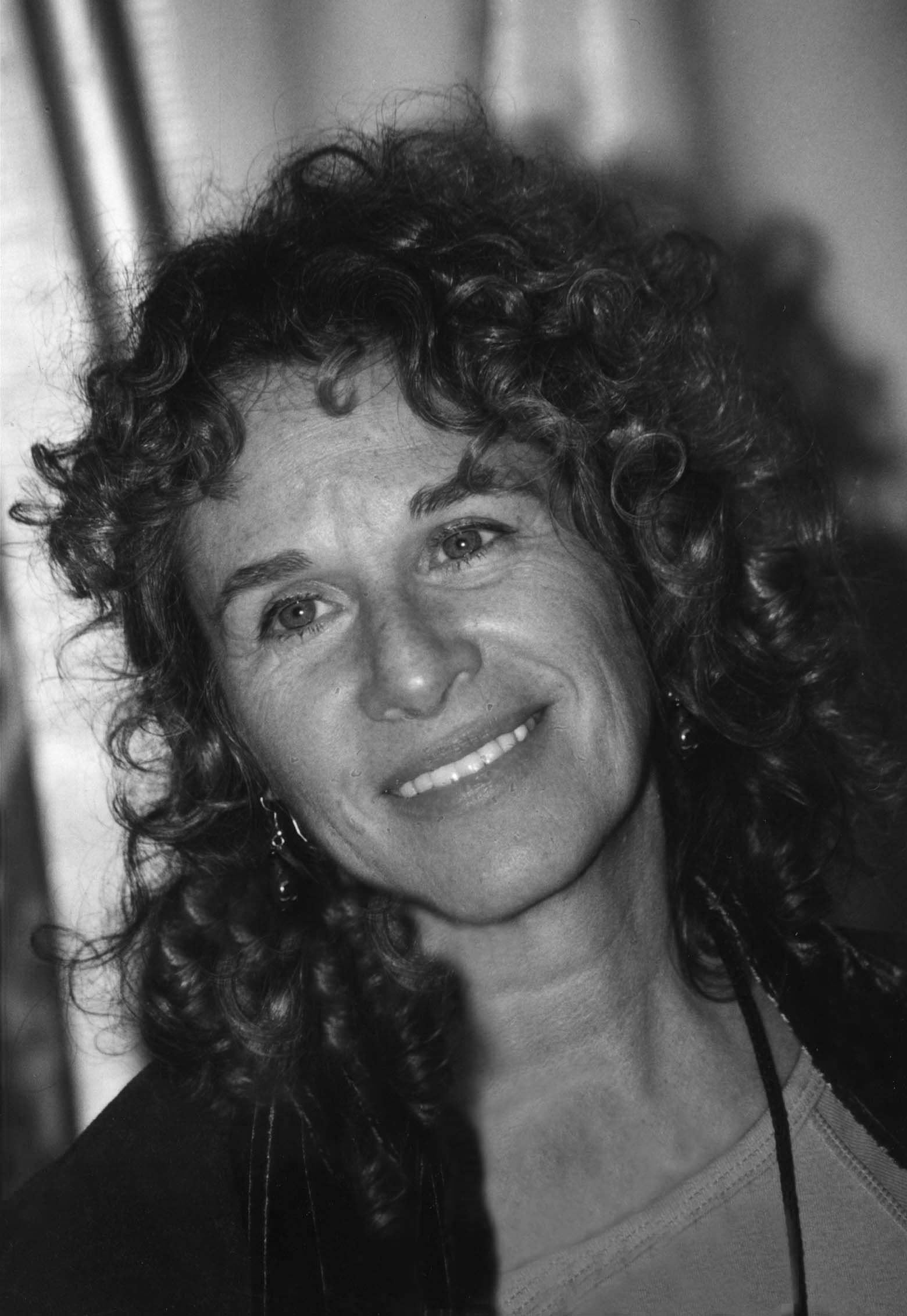
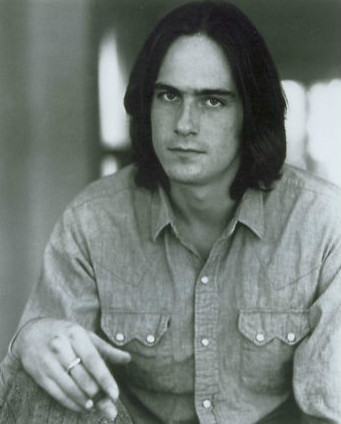
Carole King and James Taylor

Starting the show at 9:20 pm, James Taylor and Carole King came out, with King sitting down at the piano to play and sing her songs. Taylor sat quietly, playing acoustic guitar and singing harmony with King. Returning the favor, King backed Taylor on harmony when he stood in the spotlight, singing his own songs. They shared a band made up of Russ Kunkel on drums, Lee Sklar on electric bass, and Danny Kortchmar on electric guitar – Taylor's veteran touring band. As a duet, King and Taylor sang their Grammy-winning song "You've Got a Friend" to close their set, without ever mentioning politics.

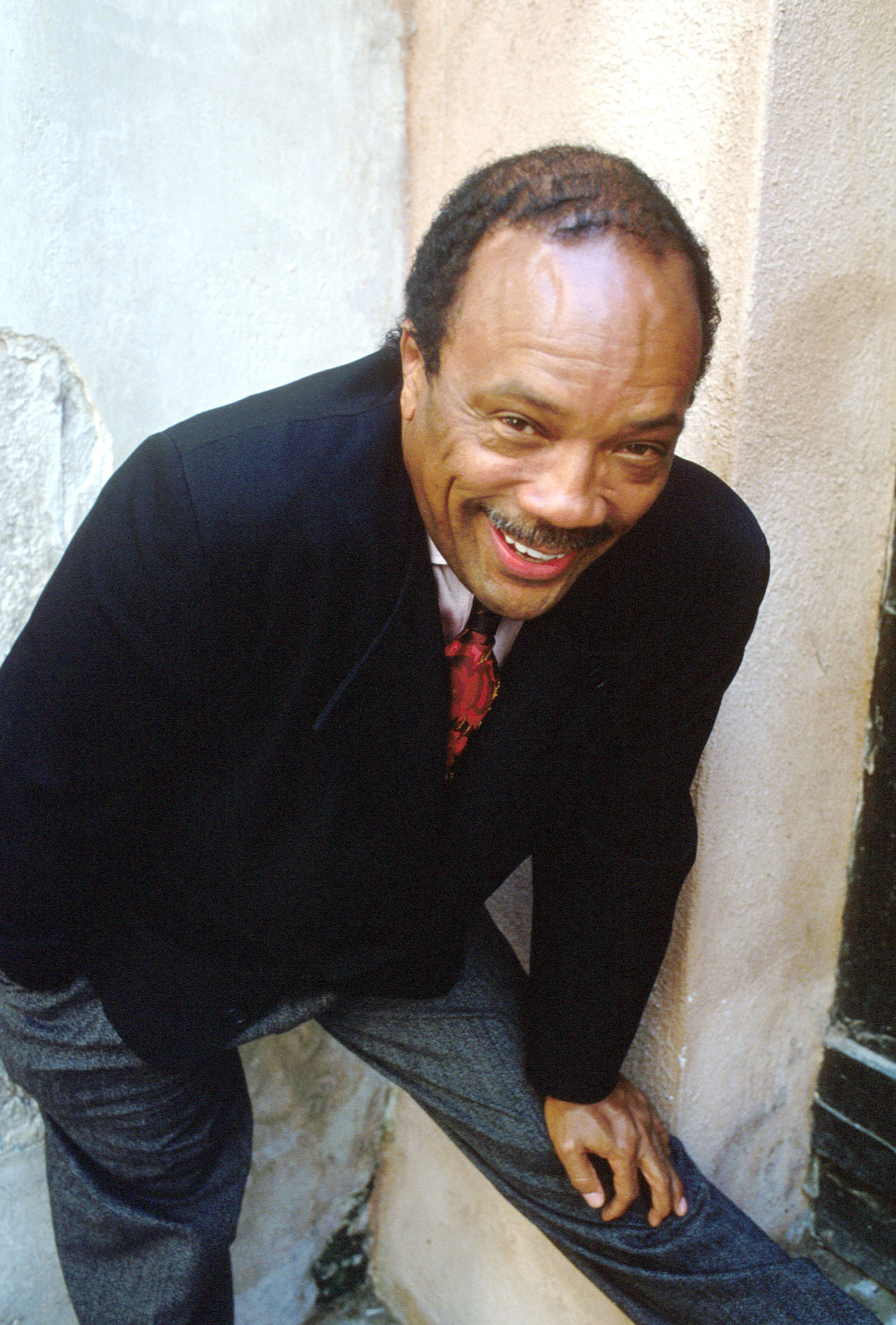
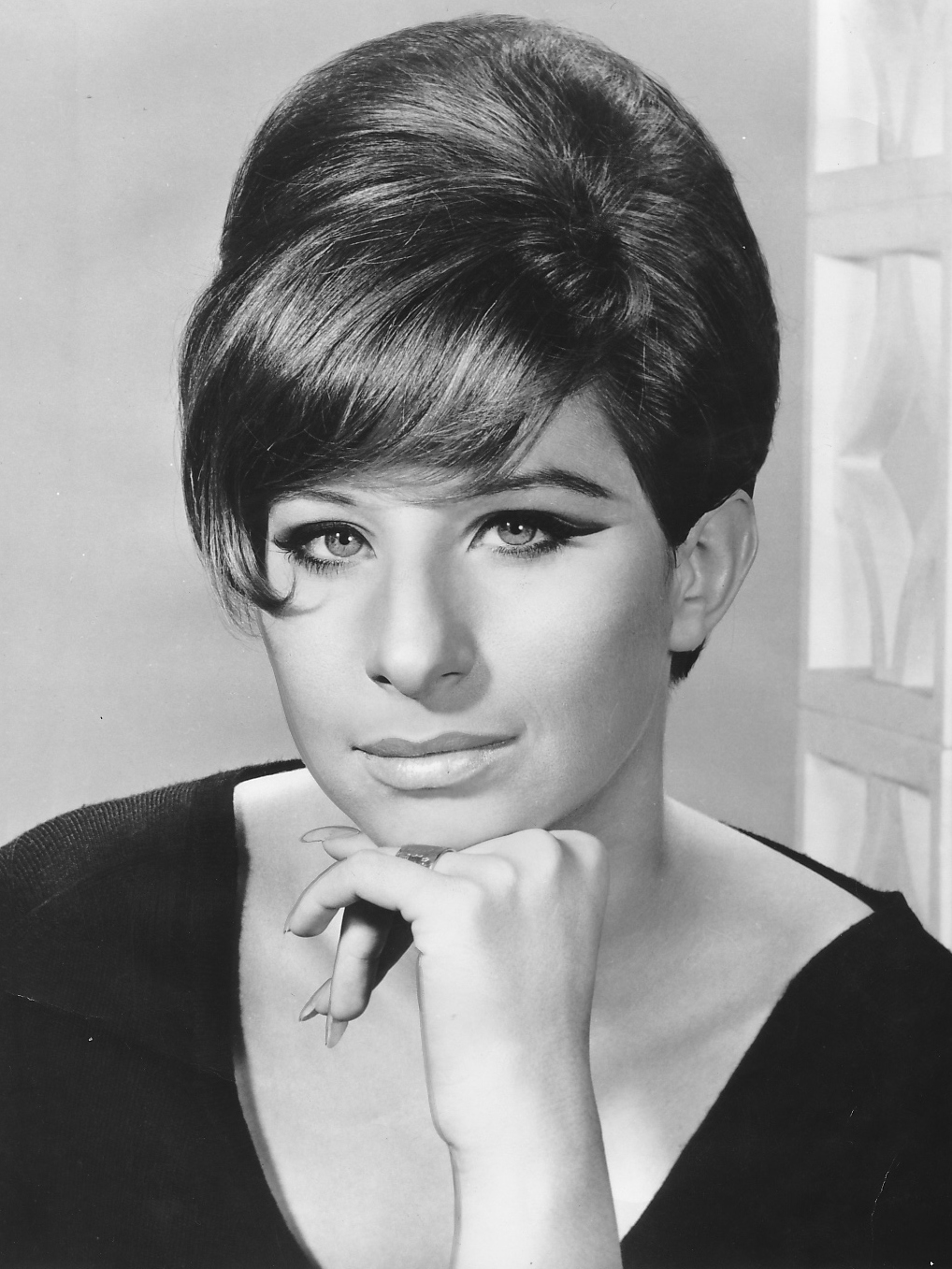
Quincy Jones and Barbra Streisand

After intermission, Quincy Jones appeared wearing a long maroon velvet dashiki to conduct his 32-piece orchestra. The ensemble included the Eddie Kendricks Singers composed of Kendricks, Venetta Fields, Marti McCall, Geraldine Jones and Clydie King, brought from Streisand's Las Vegas show. Jones played several of his familiar tunes including the theme to Ironside, a popular TV show.

Barbra Streisand entered the stage around 11 pm in a pantsuit of black satin, with a red tanktop under the black jacket. Some of the musicians in Jones' orchestra were changed for Streisand's set. Joe Sample played piano, and David Shire conducted the orchestra. Streisand started with the medley of "Sing" and "Make Your Own Kind of Music", later released as the second single of her album. She sang more songs and then talked to the crowd, pretending to toke on a marijuana joint, warning playfully against the evils of weed; a schtick she had performed many times in Las Vegas. She sang more songs including a Joe Guercio–designed medley of "Sweet Inspiration" blended into Carole King's "Where You Lead" and back again, all while the four Black women singers danced and sang with Streisand in the manner of a revival meeting. This medley was later released as Streisand's first single from the album. Her third single was a cover of Richard Harris's "Didn't We". She sang for an hour and took six standing ovations, then McGovern joined her on stage.

== McGovern ==
While Nixon was mired in the Vietnam War, McGovern was running as the anti-war candidate. He was seen as the most honest candidate but he was unexciting in person. Since 1968, when Robert F. Kennedy introduced Beatty to McGovern, Beatty had been an admirer of McGovern's quiet style. Beatty used his own charisma and extensive contacts to try and increase McGovern's chance of winning. McGovern later said that Beatty was in the top "three or four most important people in my campaign." Beatty's sister, actress Shirley MacLaine, was also campaigning strongly for McGovern, and she appeared as an usher at the concert.

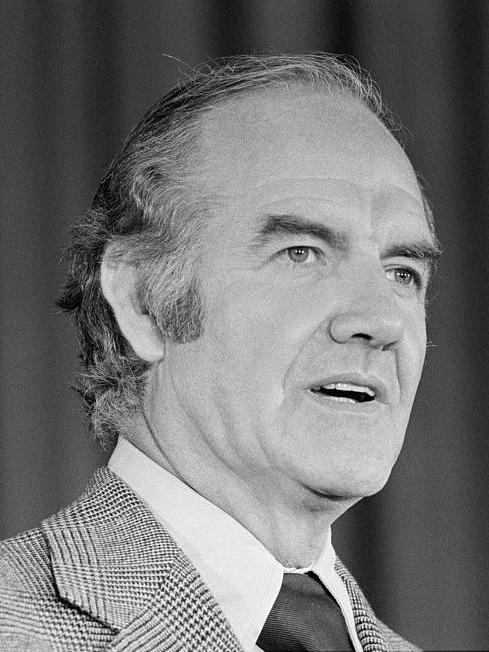
George McGovern in 1972

McGovern was scheduled to arrive late at The Forum; he and his wife, Eleanor, were flying in from Detroit after speaking at a Democratic Party fundraising dinner, the annual Jefferson–Jackson Day event. At intermission, many of the newspaper and television reporters abandoned the concert stage and waited in a hockey locker room so that they could witness McGovern's entry. Streisand's performance was piped throughout The Forum locker rooms over small speakers. James Taylor told Peter Greenberg asking about McGovern's chances, "I don't think he can beat Nixon, but who knows? Maybe some more [of Nixon's] dirty laundry will come out." When McGovern walked in to the locker room during Streisand's set, he stepped straight over to Carole King and said, "I'm one of your ardent fans, and you're really great to do this." Taylor expressed his worries to McGovern, "I sure hope this [concert] isn't hurting you more than helping you," to which McGovern replied, "Believe me... It's not." McGovern talked to reporters about a US bomb attack on Haiphong which was the day's top news story. He said it was "a desperate gamble" by Nixon who was "ineffectual in the past, reckless now, bringing us one step further away from peace."

At Streisand's final bow, James Taylor led McGovern on stage, followed by Quincy Jones, Eleanor McGovern and Carole King. George McGovern took the microphone to make a very brief statement to 18,000 fans:

You know there’s an old French proverb that says gratitude is the heart’s memory. A couple of years ago there was a song, 'Here Comes the Sun' – 'It's All Right.' Well, we’re going to see the sun again. Things can be all right again. With great effort ’72 will be a great year.

Maureen Orth, reporting for The Village Voice, said that the audience applauded the surprisingly short speech, but she was unmoved, and noticed others were shaking their heads or shrugging their shoulders at the confusing song inference. Beatty spoke to reporters after the concert, saying that more such celebrity fundraising events could be staged, and he quickly organized another at the Cleveland Arena in late April, and a third in New York after McGovern had won the important California primary. Media response to the Los Angeles concert was mixed, with some in favor, and others decrying the strange new element: mass activism of celebrities. Harry Reasoner on the ABC Evening News said that Hollywood actors should stay out of politics, that "Presidential candidates should leave endorsements to makers of false teeth cement."

In the 1972 Democratic Party presidential primaries in June, McGovern carried California, but with a 5% margin, not the expected 20% more than Hubert Humphrey. His next challenge was to win delegates at the Democratic National Convention. For a benefit concert on June 14, Beatty convinced Simon and Garfunkel to reunite for McGovern, supported by Dionne Warwicke, Nichols and May, and Peter, Paul and Mary in a fundraising rally for the presidential hopeful, held at Madison Square Garden in front of 18,000. The event was called Together for McGovern, and it reportedly raised $400,000. Simon's enthusiasm for McGovern was muted: "I do believe in the lesser of two evils, and in that spirit I became a McGovern supporter." By November 1972, Nixon had undercut McGovern's anti-war stance by promising a negotiated end to the Vietnam War. Nixon took the presidential election in a landslide.

Nine months later, in response to the December 1972 Nicaragua earthquake, the Rolling Stones mounted a benefit concert at The Forum on January 18. Cheech Marin said to the Stones publicists, "It seems like the only time you put out monumental albums or events is when you have a natural disaster." Los Angeles music writer Jacoba Atlas responded, "No, there's only been two big concerts for great disasters – unless you count McGovern."

== See also ==
- Star-Spangled Women for McGovern–Shriver
