= Together for McGovern =

1972 benefit concert for George McGovern

- Date: June 14, 1972
- Venue: Madison Square Garden
- Location: New York City
- Also known as: Together with McGovern; Stars for McGovern
- Type: Benefit concert, fundraiser
- Cause: George McGovern 1972 presidential campaign
- Organised by: Warren Beatty (executive)
- Participants: Simon & Garfunkel; Nichols and May; Peter, Paul and Mary; Dionne Warwick

Together for McGovern was a political benefit concert held on June 14, 1972, produced by actor Warren Beatty to assist the 1972 presidential campaign of George McGovern, running as the anti-war candidate, against the Vietnam War. Also known as Together with McGovern and Stars for McGovern, the concert drew a crowd of 18,000 to 20,000 attendees at Madison Square Garden in New York City. For the concert, Beatty reunited the folk duo Simon & Garfunkel, the comedy team of Nichols and May, and the folk group Peter, Paul and Mary. Appearing solo was R&B and pop singer Dionne Warwick. A number of celebrities served as ushers, and McGovern gave a speech. The event reportedly raised $400,000 (approximately $3.1 million in 2025 dollars).

This one-off reunion of Simon & Garfunkel came as a surprise to the public, as both artists had been promoting their solo careers. The album Simon and Garfunkel's Greatest Hits was released literally on the same day as the benefit by Columbia Records to capitalize on the publicity. The album rose to number 5 on the Billboard 200 in late July.

McGovern was not significantly helped by the concert; after winning the Democratic Party nomination in July, he was soundly defeated in November by incumbent President Richard Nixon.

== Background ==
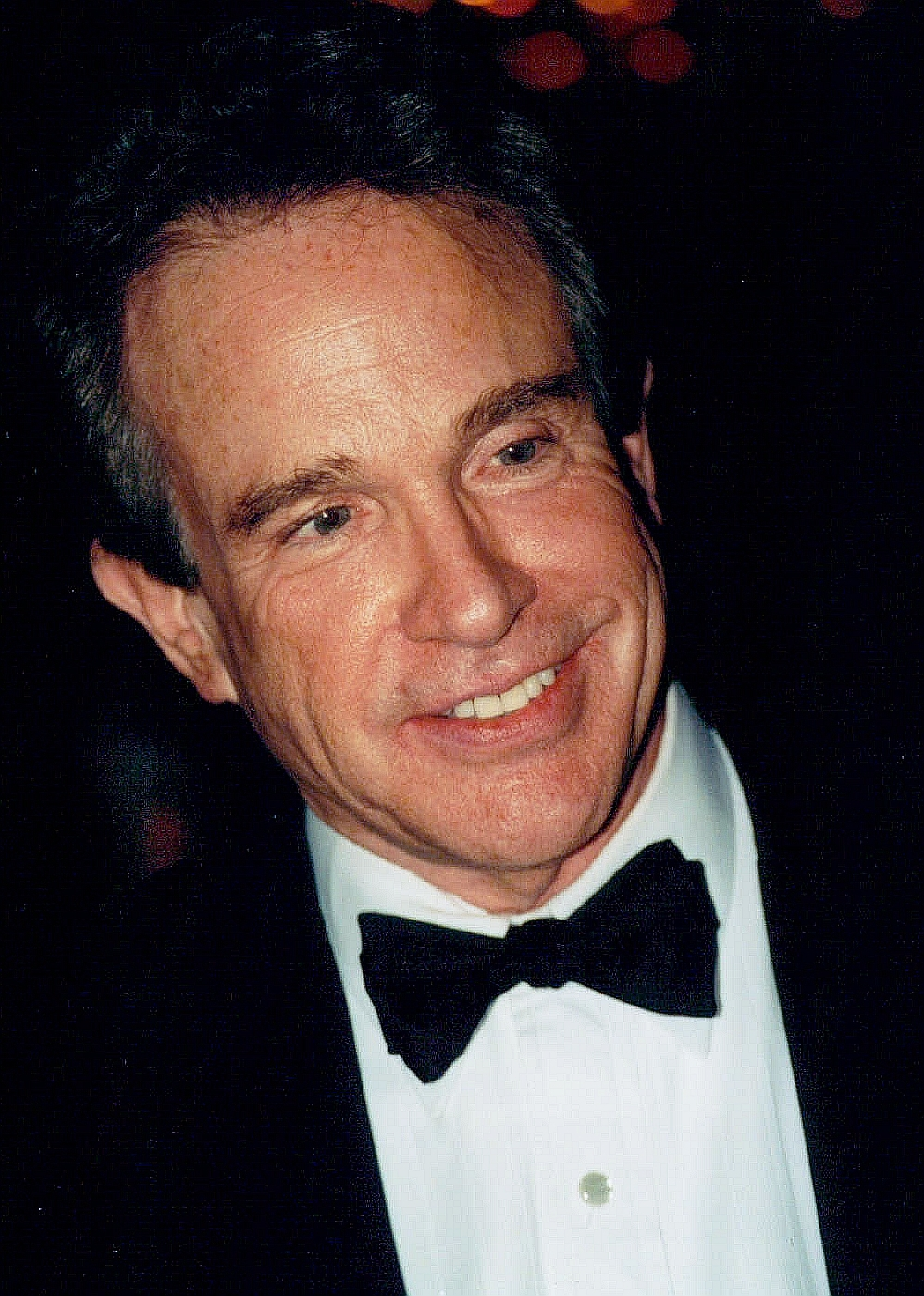
Warren Beatty produced a string of concerts for McGovern

Beatty had already produced concerts for McGovern's presidential campaign: a widely reported one in the Los Angeles area in mid-April called Four for McGovern, and another at the Cleveland Arena in late April. Two others were in San Francisco and Lincoln. These concerts had provided McGovern more media coverage and more campaign funds. In the 1972 Democratic Party presidential primaries in June, McGovern carried California, but with a 5% margin, not the expected 20% more than Hubert Humphrey. On the night of the concert in New York, McGovern's goal was to raise more money and broaden his support, so that he could win more delegates at the Democratic National Convention one month later.

Beatty had already tapped Paul Simon for the Cleveland concert in late April, and then he secured Art Garfunkel's agreement to reunite with Simon for one performance in June. Simon hated Nixon but his enthusiasm for McGovern was muted. Later he told Rolling Stone, "I do believe in the lesser of two evils, and in that spirit I became a McGovern supporter."

With Simon & Garfunkel willing to pair up, Beatty's theme for the June concert had jelled: McGovern would "bring us together again". Toward that end, Beatty called the separated comedians Mike Nichols and Elaine May to have them perform once again as a comedy duo, the first time since 1962. With these agreements in hand, Beatty convinced the broken-up Peter, Paul, and Mary to reunite for the concert. The trio wrote about their experience later, saying, "Warren's enthusiasm was infectious, and we accepted his invitation. Although none of us expressed expectations of concerts beyond appearing together for McGovern, joining our trio once more for something bigger than ourselves had a familiar, prophetic quality. The seeds of reunion had been sown."

Beatty contacted Dionne Warwick and Burt Bacharach to have them perform together. The two had made many hit songs together, the most recent being "Make It Easy on Yourself" in 1970. Bacharach declined the invitation because he had already committed himself for that date, but Warwick said yes.

== Concert ==
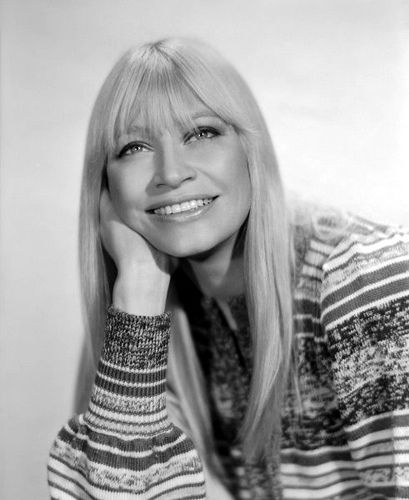
Singer Mary Travers said, "I think it's a crusade to save the country."

Tickets for the event ranged from $5 to $100 ($38.75 to $774.75 in 2025 dollars). Some 18,000 to 20,000 people attended. Celebrity ushers on the arena floor mixed with hundred-dollar ticket holders. Celebrities serving as ushers included Jack Nicholson, Dustin Hoffman, Paul Newman, Ryan O'Neal, Ben Gazzara, Candice Bergen, Judy Collins, Stacy Keach, James Earl Jones, George Plimpton, Cass Elliot, Goldie Hawn, Lee Grant, Julie Christie and Shirley MacLaine. Actress Marcheline Bertrand and her actor husband Jon Voight attended.

Nichols and May started the show around 9 pm. Nichols joked that they "had not spoken in 12 years" unlike the other artists on the program who had "quarreled viciously and broke up only a few months ago". May said she was in favor of McGovern's anti-war stance: "I've always wanted to get out of Vietnam – even before we got in!"

Peter, Paul and Mary performed next, talking about politics and singing songs including "Blowin' in the Wind" and "When the Ship Comes In" by Bob Dylan, and "Leaving on a Jet Plane" by John Denver. Mary Travers said about the McGovern campaign, "I think it's a crusade to save the country" from Nixon. Music critic Don Heckman said that the trio's singing was "cohesive", that they "sounded as if they had never been apart." They gave a rousing finish with Woody Guthrie's "This Land Is Your Land", the crowd coming to their feet.

Dionne Warwick sang a selection of her most successful songs. Producer Jon Landau said she "showed everyone why she is a such a unique interpreter of the great Bacharach and David hits".

Simon & Garfunkel performed eight songs, starting with "Mrs. Robinson". The concert was captured by a tape recorder in the audience; this bootleg recording, despite its low quality sound, was circulated among fans for years. On the bootleg, Simon is heard laughing between songs after hearing shouts from the audience. Stifling his laughter, Simon explains to the crowd that someone "wants to hear 'Voices of Old People'" – an impossible request. The suggested track was a spoken word collage on the album Bookends, featuring multiple recordings Garfunkel had made on the street, letting elderly people speak their minds. The duo ended the night with their inspirational anthem "Bridge over Troubled Water", which was a favorite of McGovern's. Garfunkel had difficulty with his voice, so Simon sang the second verse, the first time he had done so in public.

After nearly three hours of performances, McGovern appeared on stage with his wife Eleanor, and the arena rocked with applause for four minutes. McGovern stepped to the microphone to say, "Eleanor and I are glad to be here to make our contribution to the Richard Nixon retirement fund."

== Afterward ==
Following the concert, Beatty hosted a late dinner party at the nearby Four Seasons Restaurant, with A-list stars and political contributors invited. McGovern and his wife made an appearance, and the party continued until dawn.

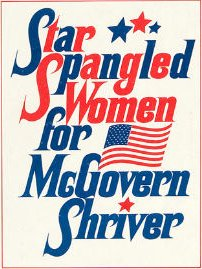
Shirley MacLaine co-produced a woman-focused event in October

A few days after the concert, New York voters went to the polls to decide a number of issues including the Democratic Party nominee for president. McGovern was predicted the clear winner, with Hubert Humphrey polling poorly, and Shirley Chisholm still holding some delegates. Paul Simon said that Chisholm's campaign, promoting women and Blacks, was significant: "It's important that she maintain her candidacy up until the very last minute." McGovern continued his success in July, winning the Democratic National Convention but failing in his wish to name Ted Kennedy as his running mate, and failing further to unite the party by convincing Humphrey to accept the position. His first choice, Thomas Eagleton, was a public relations nightmare, and his final choice, Sargent Shriver, was seen as out of touch with the working class.

Warren Beatty's sister, Shirley MacLaine, co-produced another event for McGovern in October at Madison Square Garden, called Star-Spangled Women for McGovern–Shriver. With co-producer Sid Bernstein, she brought more than a dozen women singers together for a concert, and continued the theme of having celebrity ushers. Beatty himself served as an usher.

By November, Richard Nixon had undermined McGovern's anti-war platform by announcing a withdrawal from the Vietnam War, and Nixon won the presidential election in a landslide. Six weeks later, though, Nixon ordered the bombing of Hanoi.
