= Vote McGovern =

1972 lithograph by Andy Warhol

Vote McGovern (1972) by Andy Warhol

Vote McGovern, also known as Vote McGovern, 1972, is a 1972 colored lithograph by Andy Warhol. He produced it in support of George McGovern's 1972 presidential campaign. The print doesn't depict McGovern, but instead is a depiction of a photograph of then-President of the United States Richard Nixon with his face dyed green and blue, and with his jacket and tie dyed pink and red, respectively. Nixon was the Republican and McGovern the Democrats' candidate in the 1972 United States presidential election.

It was Warhol's first political poster and has been described as Warhol's "most overtly political work". The photograph of Nixon on which the print is based was taken from a photograph of him and his wife Pat Nixon on the cover of Newsweek; Warhol chose the colors used to dye Nixon's face based on those of Mrs. Nixon's dress. Art critic Jonathan Jones described the print as follows: "Nixon's face is acidic green, colliding shockingly with an orange background, almost like classical Indian art in its chromatic intensity. It captures the way Nixon in the flesh looked like a cartoon, his head too big for his body. But that's all in the way of satire." In 2016, it was featured in a printmaking exhibition at the British Museum.
