= George McGovern presidential campaign =

George McGovern unsuccessfully ran for president three times:

- George McGovern 1968 presidential campaign, the failed campaign George McGovern conducted in 1968
- George McGovern 1972 presidential campaign, a failed presidential campaign in 1972, with McGovern losing to Richard Nixon
- George McGovern 1984 presidential campaign, an unsuccessful primary campaign
