= A Tramp Shining =

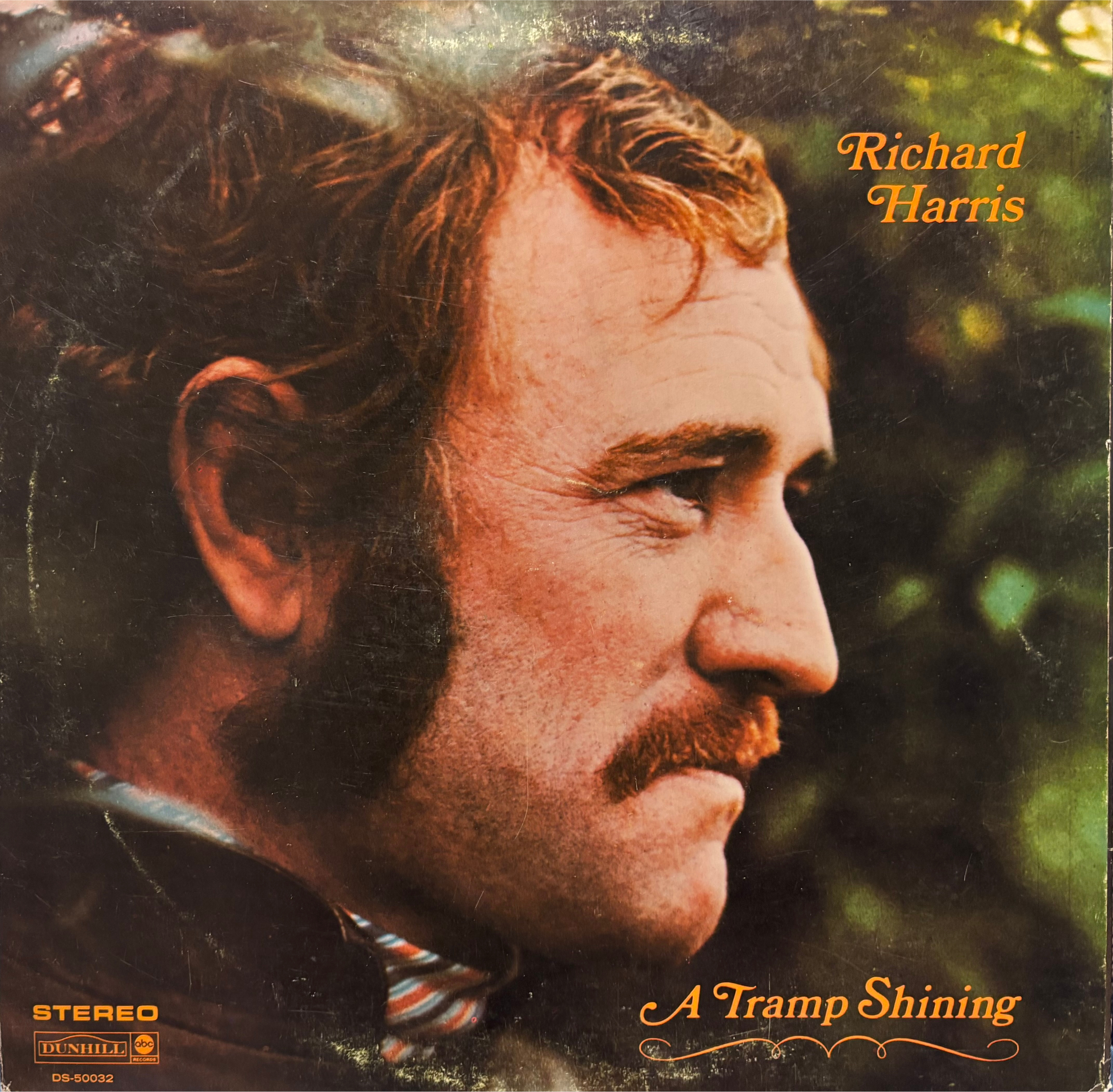

Studio album by Richard Harris
- Released: May 1968
- Recorded: December 1967 – January 1968
- Genre: Orchestral pop
- Length: 31:37
- Labels: Dunhill; Legacy
- Producer: Jimmy Webb

Richard Harris chronology
Camelot Soundtrack (1967)	A Tramp Shining (1968)	The Yard Went On Forever (1968)

Singles from A Tramp Shining
- 1. "MacArthur Park" Released: April 1968; 2. "Didn't We" Released: August 1968

A Tramp Shining is the debut album of Richard Harris, released in 1968 by Dunhill Records. The album was written, arranged, and produced by singer-songwriter Jimmy Webb. Although Harris sang several numbers on the soundtrack album to the film musical Camelot the previous year, A Tramp Shining was Harris' first solo album. "MacArthur Park" was one of the biggest singles of that year, reaching number 2 on the Billboard Hot 100 chart in the United States. The album as a whole was also highly successful and was nominated for a Grammy Award for Album of the Year in 1969.

== Reception ==
Professional ratings
Review scores
Source	Rating
AllMusic	4/5 stars

In his review in AllMusic, Bruce Eder gave the album four out of five stars, calling A Tramp Shining a "great record, even 35 years later, encompassing pop, rock, elements of classical music, and even pop-soul in a body of brilliant, bittersweet romantic songs by Webb, all presented in a consistently affecting and powerful vocal performance by Harris." Eder praised Harris' performance for its "sheer bravado", writing of his rendition of "Didn't We":

Harris treaded onto Frank Sinatra territory here, and he did it with a voice not remotely as good or well trained as his, yet he pulled it off by sheer bravado and his ability as an actor, coupled with his vocal talents—his performance was manly and vulnerable enough to make women swoon, but powerful and manly enough to allow their husbands and boyfriends to feel okay listening to a man's man like Harris singing on such matters.

Eder was equally impressed with Jimmy Webb's production and arrangements, which he called "some of the lushest ever heard on a pop album of the period." Eder concluded:

Strangely enough, "MacArthur Park"—the massive hit off the album—isn't all that representative of the rest of the record, which relies much more on strings than brass and horns, and has a somewhat lower-key feel but also a great deal more subtlety. One can also hear the influence of Webb's then-recent work with the Fifth Dimension in the presence of the muted female chorus on "In the Final Hours" and, much more so, on "If You Must Leave My Life" (perhaps the best song on the album, and the most complex, with heavy rhythm guitar, a great beat, and lush orchestrations), which almost sounds like a lost Fifth Dimension cut.

== Track listing ==
All songs were written and arranged by Jimmy Webb.

Side one
No.	Title	Length
1.	"Prelude"	0:24
2.	"Didn't We?"	2:24
3.	"Interlude #1"	0:29
4.	"Paper Chase"	2:15
5.	"Interlude #2"	0:31
6.	"Name of My Sorrow"	3:21
7.	"Interlude #3"	0:27
8.	"Lovers Such as I"	3:36
9.	"In the Final Hours"	2:45
Total length:		16:12

Side two
No.	Title	Length
1.	"MacArthur Park"	7:20
2.	"Dancing Girl"	2:06
3.	"Interlude #4"	0:19
4.	"If You Must Leave My Life"	3:18
5.	"A Tramp Shining"	2:22
Total length:		15:25

== Personnel ==
- Richard Harris – vocals
- Jimmy Webb – producer, arranger, composer
- William F. Williams – supervision
- Hal Blaine – drums
- Larry Knechtel – keyboards
- Mike Deasy – guitar
- Joe Osborn – bass guitar
- Sid Sharp – string arrangements
- Jules Chaikin – trumpet
- Jimmy Horn – saxophone
- Tommy Tedesco – guitar

Technical

- Armin Steiner – engineer
- Peter Himmelman – London engineer
- Gary Burden – art direction and design
- Henry Diltz – photography
- Patrick Ward – photography

== Chart positions ==
Chart peaks for A Tramp Shining
Chart (1968)	Peak position
US Billboard Top LP's	4
US Cashbox Top 100 Albums	3
