= The Yard Went On Forever =

Studio album by Richard Harris
- Released: October 1968
- Recorded: 1968
- Genre: Pop
- Label: Dunhill
- Producer: Jimmy Webb

Richard Harris chronology
A Tramp Shining (1968)	The Yard Went On Forever (1968)	My Boy (1971)

The Yard Went On Forever is the second album by Richard Harris, released in 1968 by Dunhill Records (DS-50042). The album was written, arranged, and produced by Jimmy Webb.

== Reception ==
A review of the album in Billboard said "Webb's material is treated with class and finesse" by Harris. Album track "Lucky Me" was described in the magazine as "a shimmering gem."

In his review on Allmusic, Bruce Eder praised the project, comparing it to the previous Richard Harris album, A Tramp Shining, and writing that "the lyrics are dazzling in their cascading imagery, the music is richer and more vividly conceived and recorded, and the entire album works magnificently."

== Track listing ==
All songs were written by Jimmy Webb.

Side one

1. "The Yard Went on Forever" – 5:43
2. "Watermark" – 4:27
3. "Interim" – 3:07
4. "Gayla" – 3:19

Side two

1. "The Hymns From The Grand Terrace" – 9:07
2. "The Hive" – 3:59
3. "Lucky Me" – 2:56
4. "That's The Way It Was" – 3:00

== Personnel ==
- Richard Harris - vocals
- Jimmy Webb – arranger, producer, piano
- Joe Osborn – bass guitar
- Skip Mosher – flute
- Art Maebe – French horn
- David Duke – French horn
- George Price – French horn
- William Henshaw – French horn
- Mike Deasy – lead guitar
- Fred Tackett – rhythm guitar, trumpet
- Lance Wakely – rhythm guitar
- Larry Knechtel – harpsichord, organ, keyboards
- Hal Blaine – percussion
- Sid Sharp – strings
- Gary Coleman – timpani
- Milt Holland – timpani
- Frank Rosolino – trombone
- Lou Blackburn – trombone
- Bud Brisbois – trumpet
- Jules Chaikin – trumpet

Technical

- Armin Steiner, William F. Williams - engineer
- Gary Burden - art direction
- Henry Diltz - photography

== Chart performance ==
Chart peaks for The Yard Went On Forever
Chart (1969)	Peak position
US Billboard Top LP's	27
US Cashbox Top 100 Albums	21
