= The Yard Went on Forever (song) =

Single by Richard Harris

from the album The Yard Went on Forever
- B-side: "Lucky Me"
- Released: 1968
- Length: 5:00
- Label: Dunhill
- Songwriter(s): Jimmy Webb
- Producer(s): Jimmy Webb

Richard Harris singles chronology
"MacArthur Park" (1968)	"The Yard Went on Forever" (1968)	"Didn't We" (1968)

"The Yard Went on Forever" is a song recorded by Richard Harris for his second studio album, The Yard Went on Forever (1968).

== Track listings and formats ==
UK commercial 7" single

- A1 "The Yard Went on Forever" – 5:00
- B1 "Lucky Me" – 2:56

== Charts ==
Chart (1968)	Peak position
US Billboard Hot 100	64
US Adult Contemporary (Billboard)	23
