= Eleanor McGovern =

Spouse of American politician

- Born: Eleanor Fay Stegeberg; November 25, 1921; Woonsocket, South Dakota, U.S.
- Died: January 25, 2007 (aged 85); Mitchell, South Dakota, U.S.
- Education: Dakota Wesleyan University (did not graduate)
- Spouse: George McGovern (m. 1943)
- Children: 5

Eleanor Fay McGovern (née Stegeberg; November 25, 1921 – January 25, 2007) was the wife of George McGovern, who served as a U.S. Senator from South Dakota from 1963 to 1981, and was the Democratic presidential nominee in 1972.

== Early life and education ==
Born in Woonsocket, South Dakota, she grew up on her family's farm. Her mother died when Eleanor was only 12, leaving her and her twin sister, Ila (1921–1996), responsible for the upkeep of the household and the raising of their younger sister, Phyllis (1928–2018). As a teenager, McGovern became interested in political and social issues, and joined debate teams, first at Woonsocket High School and later during her one year at Dakota Wesleyan University. She went to High School in Woonsocket, South Dakota, and as a high academic achiever, she graduated in 1940, as salutatorian.

During one high school debate, in her native Woonsocket, she first met George McGovern, after she and her sister Ila defeated McGovern and his partner. George was impressed with Eleanor's intellect, speaking ability, and command of her subject matter. The couple met again and fell in love, while both were at Dakota Wesleyan, and later became engaged, but initially decided not to marry until World War II ended. However, they chose to marry earlier, on October 31, 1943, while on three-day leave, in a ceremony at a small Methodist church in Woonsocket, with George's father, a Methodist minister, presiding.

== Career ==
Financial difficulties forced her to withdraw from college. On a limited budget, she found work for a period as a legal secretary for Herbert Hitchcock and Fred Nichol in Mitchell, South Dakota.

Eleanor followed George to a number of training stops, before he was sent into combat overseas as a B-24 bomber pilot stationed in Italy and making runs over Nazi Germany. McGovern's flight crew, many of whom met her and had a favorable impression, recommended naming their plane the Dakota Queen after Eleanor.

=== As campaigner ===
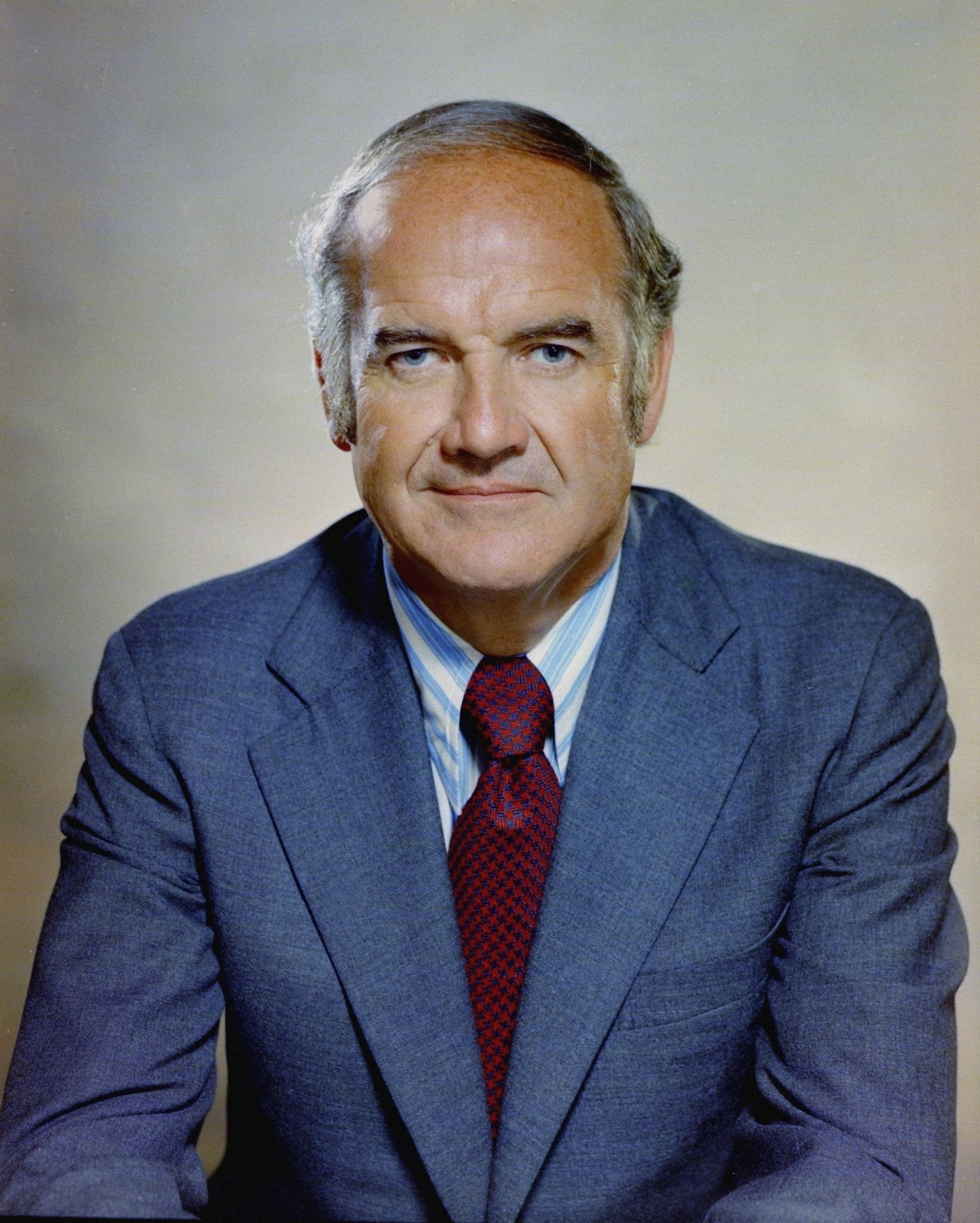
Presidential candidate George McGovern, 1972

McGovern was an active political wife; she campaigned for her ailing husband in his 1962 United States Senate race. Eleanor took active roles in her husband's campaigns, which included his elections to the US House of Representatives, the US Senate and significantly when he won the Democratic presidential nomination in 1972. With some assistance from Eleanor's campaigning, George won 11 state primaries including South Dakota and the two largest states, New York and California.

Robert G. Duffet, President of Dakota Wesleyan University, noted that "Eleanor was the first spouse to campaign for her husband alone. They had such confidence in her ability to articulate an issue they just sent her out campaigning. That was huge in '72. It was unprecedented." Duffet also commented on what an important impact she had on her husband's political journey. "Eleanor McGovern, it seemed, was a greater influence on her husband's politics than he was on hers. She came from a family of Democrats; he was initially a Republican. During the 1972 presidential election, when her husband won the Democratic nomination, she was featured on the cover of Time magazine along with First Lady Pat Nixon. During the campaign, The Eleanor McGovern Cookbook: a Collection of South Dakota Family Favorites was published.

After her husband's resounding loss in the 1972 United States presidential election, and subsequent defeat for a fourth Senate term in 1980, she remained active, particularly in combating world hunger. She was also greatly concerned with issues related to child development, and with the fight against alcoholism, which was a contributing factor in the death of her daughter Teresa in 1994.

=== Civic work and associations ===
With some frequency, she discussed international and national issues with the American Press. She addressed civic, academic and women's groups as an advocate for women's issues, family life and children. She authored articles and granted interviews on a variety of relevant issues from which she had life experience, including alcoholism. She authored a biography and memoir, Uphill: A Personal Journey, in 1974. In Uphill, she wrote about how she was affected in her childhood by her father's struggle to make a living on their South Dakota farm during the depression. "I still carry a trace of bitterness about poverty. It was not ennobling for my father and grandfather to scratch out a living on land rendered barren. The poor have few choices in life. About all they can do is persevere".

She remained highly involved in civic work acting as a board member for Dakota Wesleyan University, The Psychiatric Institute Foundation, The Child Study Association, a leading authority on child development, The Erickson Institute of Chicago, an advocate of early childhood education, and Odyssey House of New York, a broad-based New York drug and alcohol treatment and rehabilitation center. She was also acted as a volunteer for the Child Development Center. As a cornerstone, she helped establish the McGovern Family Foundation for research on alcoholism.

Though she was unable to attend due to failing health, the George and Eleanor McGovern Library and Center for Leadership and Public Service was dedicated on the campus of Dakota Wesleyan University on October 7, 2006. She did later tour the library in a wheelchair.

== Personal life ==
Together, the McGoverns had five children: daughters Ann, Susan, Mary, Teresa, and son Steven. She began to suffer from bouts of depression, but continued to assume the major share of household and child-rearing duties during her husband's political career.

In a 2005 interview, Eleanor said, "I was determined to help with George's career, not only by taking responsibility for the family, but by contributing ideas, in fact I never considered it George's career--it was ours".

McGovern died at her home in Mitchell, South Dakota, of heart failure on January 25, 2007, at the age of 85.
