= George McGovern 1972 presidential campaign =

American political campaign

George McGovern for President 1972
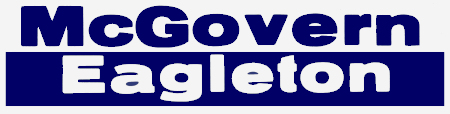
- Campaign: 1972 Democratic primaries 1972 U.S. presidential election
- Candidate: George McGovern; U.S. Senator from South Dakota (1963–1981); Sargent Shriver; U.S. Ambassador to France (1968–1970)
- Affiliation: Democratic Party
- Status: Announced: January 18, 1971; Official nominee: July 13, 1972; Lost election: November 7, 1972
- Slogan(s): Come Home, America; McGovern. Democrat. For the People
- Theme song: "Bridge over Troubled Water" by Paul Simon

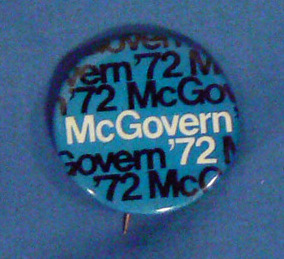
McGovern campaign button

The George McGovern 1972 presidential campaign began when United States Senator George McGovern from South Dakota launched his second candidacy for the Presidency of the United States in an ultimately unsuccessful bid to win the 1972 presidential election against incumbent president Richard Nixon, winning only in the District of Columbia and the state of Massachusetts. If elected, McGovern would have been the first South Dakota native to become president. McGovern's running mate, former U.S. ambassador to France Sargent Shriver (who replaced Senator Thomas Eagleton), would have become the second vice president from Maryland, after the incumbent vice president at that time, Spiro Agnew, and the first Roman Catholic vice president; this feat would be eventually accomplished 36 years later by Joe Biden, who would become the first Catholic vice president.

== Leading up to the announcement ==
McGovern had run a short presidential campaign in 1968, acting as a stand-in for the assassinated Robert F. Kennedy leading up to the 1968 Democratic National Convention. McGovern then spent the remainder of the general election campaign ensuring his own re-election to the Senate.

But following the 1968 convention, he had planned on running for president again, a decision he solidified in January 1969. He began hiring legislative aides who could double as campaign policy staff, press secretaries, and the like. McGovern hired an agent to book speaking engagements, and in early 1969 began doing an average of three appearances a week.

During 1969, McGovern headed the Commission on Party Structure and Delegate Selection, often later referred to as the "McGovern commission", which was chartered to redesign the Democratic nomination system after the messy and confused nomination struggle and convention of the 1968 election. Due to the former influence of Eugene McCarthy and Kennedy supporters on the staff, the commission significantly reduced the role of party officials and insiders in the nomination process, increased the role of caucuses and primaries, and mandated quotas for proportional black, women, and youth delegate representation. McGovern's staff may have been influenced by the model of John F. Kennedy's 1952 campaign for the Senate, where his acting campaign manager Robert Kennedy had created an organizational structure that had 286 campaign "secretaries" function as "shadow units" to the regular Democratic Party machinery, ensuring their loyalty lay first with the Candidate and not exclusively to the Party.

Senate Majority Whip Ted Kennedy, the younger brother of Robert and John, had been the early favorite to win the 1972 nomination, but his hopes were derailed by his role in the July 1969 Chappaquiddick incident.

McGovern's early efforts were beset by organizational problems and much activity without plan or result in polls. He began replacing most of the campaign staff. In March 1970, he met Gary Hart in Denver, and soon hired him to be his Western political affairs coordinator; a couple of months later, he became McGovern's national campaign director. Shortly thereafter he opened a New York office and hired the first woman as executive director, Phyllis Holtzer, a former Robert Kennedy staffer. At a July 25, 1970, get-together at McGovern's farm in St. Michael's, Maryland, the McGovern campaign was restarted.

The favorite for the Democratic nomination by then was Edmund Muskie, the 1968 vice-presidential nominee, who had especially benefited from a speech on the eve of the congressional elections in November 1970 that made a calm but effective response to statements by President Richard Nixon and Vice President Spiro Agnew impugning the patriotism of Democrats.

== Announcement ==
McGovern announced his candidacy on January 18, 1971, in the form of a televised speech from the studios of KELO-TV in Sioux Falls, South Dakota, and in letters sent to many a newspaper editorial board and potential backer. The early entry, nearly two years before the election date, was designed to give him time to overcome Muskie's large lead.

In his announcement speech, McGovern promised to withdraw every American soldier from Indochina if elected. He said economic conditions would also be improved by an end to the war and reduced military spending. McGovern declared some themes of his campaign:

I seek the presidency because I believe deeply in the American promise and can no longer accept the diminishing of that promise. ... I make one pledge above all others—to seek and speak the truth with all the resources of mind and spirit I command. ... I seek to call America home to those principles that gave us birth.

At the time of his announcement, McGovern ranked fifth among Democrats in a presidential preference Gallup Poll.

== Campaign staff and policy team ==
Future senator Gary Hart (who subsequently sought the 1984 Democratic presidential nomination and emerged as the frontrunner for the 1988 Democratic presidential nomination before his campaign was prematurely thwarted by an extramarital liaison) was McGovern's campaign manager. Future president Bill Clinton (with assistance from his wife and 2016 Democratic presidential nominee Hillary Rodham) managed the McGovern campaign's operations in Texas.

Taking their cue from the McGovern–Fraser Commission, Hart and future United States District Judge Rick Stearns (an expert on the new system) devised a strategy to focus on the 28 states holding caucuses instead of primary elections. They felt the nature of the caucuses made them easier (and less costly) to win if they targeted their efforts. Recruited as a Harvard University senior by Hart, 22-year-old pollster Pat Caddell also played an integral role in paving McGovern's route to the nomination by encouraging him "to increase his populist rhetoric and tour factories instead of obsessing about the Vietnam War."

MIT Sloan School of Management professor Edwin Kuh headed McGovern's economic advisory panel, for which he recruited Lester Thurow and other academic economists.

Abner "Abby" Levine served as Vice Chairman of Finance. Levine and former Robert Kennedy staffer Phyllis Holtzer established the New York office, helped to organize at least five big events, and met regularly with the senator. They assisted Warren Beatty with his production of Together for McGovern, which filled Madison Square Garden and reunited Nichols and May, Simon and Garfunkel, and Peter, Paul and Mary. Singer Dionne Warwick also performed.

Washington Redskins guard Ray Schoenke was named chairman of Professional Athletes for McGovern. In this capacity, Schoenke recruited over 83 professional athletes to endorse and campaign for McGovern. Among these athletes were Schoenke, Buck Buchanan, George Seals, Ed Podolak, Marv Fleming, Jan Stenerud and Bob Stein.

== Political positions ==
Here is a list of what Senator McGovern ran for in the 1972 presidential election:

- George McGovern was a passionate critic of U.S. involvement in the Vietnam War, believing that American military action was not only unwarranted but also destructive to both American and Vietnamese lives. He called for an immediate withdrawal of American troops.
- McGovern proposed a bold plan for comprehensive national health insurance that aimed to ensure that every American had access to quality healthcare, regardless of their economic status. He believed that healthcare is a fundamental right and should be accessible to all, not just those with the means to afford it.
- Recognizing the growing rates of poverty in America, McGovern supported the introduction of a guaranteed minimum income. This proposal aimed to provide a safety net for disadvantaged individuals and families, ensuring that everyone could meet their basic needs for food, shelter, and healthcare. By alleviating poverty through this financial support, McGovern sought to create a more equitable society and reduce the stigma associated with receiving assistance.
- McGovern was a strong advocate for education reform, emphasizing the need for increased funding for public education at all levels. He believed that accessible and affordable higher education was essential for both individual success and societal progress. Proposals included enhanced funding for public schools, the establishment of loan programs with favorable terms for students, and initiatives to ensure that college remained within reach for families from all economic backgrounds.
- McGovern understood the urgency of addressing environmental issues and advocated for stronger regulations and policies designed to combat pollution and protect natural resources.
- A staunch supporter of labor unions and workers' rights, McGovern championed fair wages and improved working conditions for all workers. He believed that the rights of workers must be upheld to create a fair and just economy.
- McGovern was a fervent supporter of women's rights, advocating for the Equal Rights Amendment (ERA) to ensure that gender equality was enshrined in the Constitution. His policies focused on advancing reproductive rights and addressing issues of gender discrimination in the workplace.
- McGovern held a deep commitment to civil rights, emphasizing the necessity for equal rights and protections for all racial and ethnic groups. He actively advocated for anti-discrimination measures to combat systemic racism.
- McGovern envisioned a foreign policy rooted in diplomacy, cooperation, and respect for human rights rather than military intervention. He believed in fostering peaceful relationships with other nations through dialogue and collaboration.
- Aware of the growing influence of money in politics, McGovern called for comprehensive reforms to reduce this influence and promote fair elections. He argued that campaign financing should be transparent and equitable, ensuring that all candidates had an equal opportunity to be heard and elected, regardless of their financial backing.
- Addressing hunger and malnutrition was a central concern for McGovern, who proposed a series of measures aimed at assisting low-income families through food assistance programs.
- McGovern advocated passionately for the protection and expansion of Social Security benefits, recognizing its vital role in providing financial security for the elderly. He believed that a strong social safety net was essential for assisting seniors in maintaining their dignity and quality of life, and he proposed measures to enhance benefits to address the rising costs of living.
- Supporting a progressive tax system, McGovern sought to alleviate the tax burden on the middle class while ensuring that wealthier individuals contribute more. His vision was to create a tax system that would promote economic equity, enabling increased funding for social services and public programs that could benefit all Americans, particularly the most disadvantaged.
- McGovern focused on revitalizing urban areas, understanding that cities faced significant challenges in terms of infrastructure, housing, and social services. He proposed initiatives for federal funding and support aimed at addressing these urban issues.

== Campaign developments, 1971 ==
The establishment favorite for the Democratic nomination was Ed Muskie, the moderate who acquitted himself well as the 1968 Democratic vice-presidential candidate. In August 1971 Harris polling amid a growing economic crisis, Muskie came out on top of incumbent Nixon if the election had been held that day.

Established Washington press figures such as Walter Lippman and Jack Germond did not think McGovern had a chance of winning, proclaiming him "too decent" a man, not strong enough for a combative campaign, and too reflexively liberal. Jimmy "The Greek" Snyder gave 200–1 odds against McGovern winning.

== Primary campaign, 1972 ==
In the initial event of the campaign season, McGovern placed a strong third in the Iowa caucuses. How much attention and momentum this actually generated for his campaign is still debated.

Prior to the New Hampshire primary, the "Canuck letter" was published in the Manchester Union-Leader. The letter, whose authenticity was later brought into question, claimed that Muskie had made disparaging remarks about French-Canadians. Subsequently, the paper published an attack on the character of Muskie's wife Jane, reporting that she drank and used off-color language. Muskie made an emotional defense of his wife in a speech outside the newspaper's offices during a snowstorm. Though Muskie later stated that what had appeared to the press as tears were actually melted snowflakes, the press reported that Muskie broke down and cried. Muskie did worse than expected in the primary, while McGovern came in a surprisingly close second. While Muskie's campaign funding and support dried up, McGovern picked up valuable momentum in the following months.

McGovern did attract some celebrity supporters, McGovern recalled that "Carole King helped me; Lauren Bacall; James Taylor; Paul Newman; Goldie Hawn; Linda Ronstadt; Burt Lancaster; Jack Nicholson; Peter, Paul and Mary. Shirley MacLaine appeared with me. Warren Beatty came out, too, and did a lot of fundraising for me. Helen Gahagan Douglas, a former California Congresswoman who was the first victim of Nixon's Dirty Tricks in the 1950 Senate race came out of retirement to fight hard for me. They were with me from the beginning to the end." On April 15, 1972, Beatty produced Four for McGovern, a fundraising concert for McGovern at The Forum in Greater Los Angeles in front of an audience of 18,000 people. Carole King, James Taylor, Quincy Jones and Barbra Streisand performed. Seat prices ranged from $5.50 to $100, and the event grossed $300,000, but after the expenses of producing the show, McGovern's campaign was given only $18,000. On June 24, 1972, Neil Young and Graham Nash with the Stray Gators released "War Song" as a single in support of McGovern's campaign. Although the song garnered radio airplay, it stalled at No. 61 on the Billboard singles chart.

After McGovern had won the Massachusetts primary on April 25, 1972, journalist Robert Novak phoned Democratic politicians around the country, who agreed with his assessment that blue-collar workers voting for McGovern did not understand what he really stood for. On April 27, Novak reported in a column that an unnamed Democratic senator had talked to him about McGovern and said: "The people don’t know McGovern is for amnesty, abortion and legalization of pot. Once middle America – Catholic middle America, in particular – finds this out, he’s dead." Although McGovern only supported the decriminalization of marijuana and maintained that legalized abortion fell under the purview of states' rights, he became known as the candidate of "amnesty, abortion and acid."

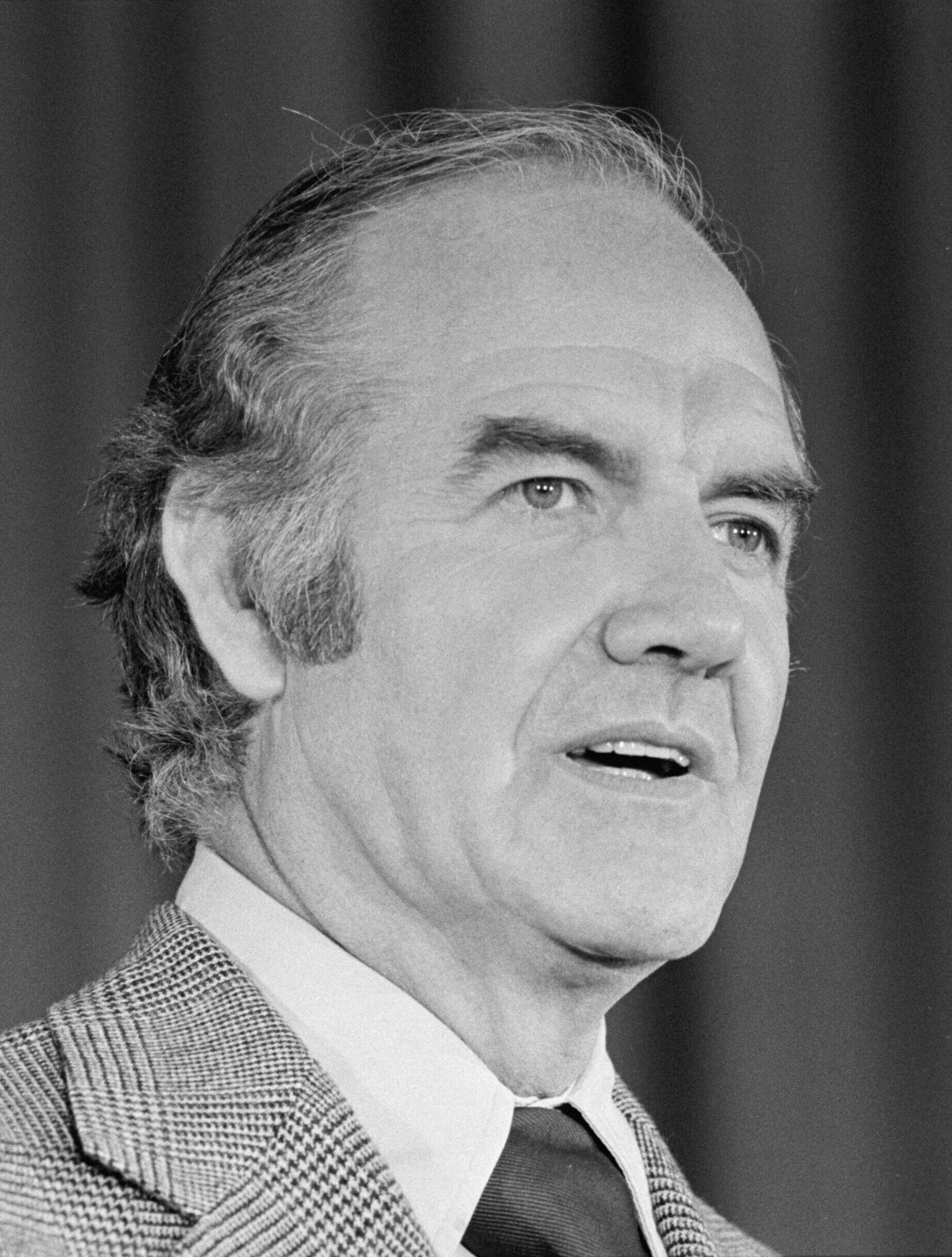
McGovern speaking during the campaign. June 30, 1972

Feminist leader Gloria Steinem was reluctant to join the McGovern campaign. Though she had brought in McGovern's single largest campaign contributor in 1968, she "still had been treated like a frivolous pariah by much of McGovern's campaign staff." And in April 1972, Steinem remarked that he "still doesn't understand the women's movement."

Despite concerns from moderate and conservative Democrats, paradigmatic Cold War liberal and early neoconservative Senator Scoop Jackson failed to gain traction against McGovern and only made real news later in the campaign as part of the "Anybody but McGovern" coalition.

A lighter incident occurred regarding that accusation during the Nebraska primary campaign. The state's former governor, Frank Morrison, who was actively campaigning for McGovern, sought to counter the Jackson and Humphrey campaigns' effective use of the accusation. During a campaign speech, Morrison declared, "They say that George McGovern is for the legalization of marijuana, but I say --" At this point there was thunderous applause from the younger people in the audience, which left Morrison puzzled, but when it died down, he finished, "I tell you that George McGovern does not advocate the legalization of marijuana." This produced cries of disappointment in the audience. He continued, "They say George McGovern is for abortion on demand, but I tell you--" Again there was deafening applause, followed by sighs of regret when he finished the sentence: "But I say to you that George McGovern is against tampering with our state laws on abortion." Afterwards, Morrison confessed to McGovern, "Maybe I'm too old to understand this new generation. I'll get the oldsters for you, and you take care of the young ones as you think best." McGovern won the Nebraska primary.

McGovern lost several primaries (most notably Michigan) to George Wallace. In the South, Wallace drew support based on a long history as an ardent segregationist and was well known for his actions to prevent racial integration of the University of Alabama. He did well in the South (winning every county in the Florida primary) and among Democrats who were alienated by liberal positions opposing the Vietnam War and greater inclusion of African-Americans and women in the Democratic Party. What might have become a forceful campaign was cut short when Wallace was shot and left paralyzed in an assassination attempt while campaigning. Wallace did win the Maryland primary, but his near-assassination effectively ended his campaign.

Ultimately, McGovern succeeded in winning the nomination by winning primaries through grassroots support in spite of establishment opposition.

== Democratic National Convention ==
The new rules for choosing and seating delegates created an unusual number of rules and credentials challenges. Many traditional Democratic groups, such as organized labor and urban constituents, had little representation at the convention. Their supporters challenged the seating of relative political novices, but for the most part were turned back by the supporters of McGovern, who during the presidential primaries had amassed the most delegates to the convention by using a grassroots campaign that was powered by opposition to the Vietnam War. Many traditional Democratic leaders and politicians felt that McGovern's delegate count did not reflect the wishes of most Democratic voters. Georgia Governor Jimmy Carter (who would be nominated and elected himself four years later) helped to spearhead a "Stop McGovern" campaign.

The stop-McGovern forces tried unsuccessfully to alter the delegate composition of the California delegation. The California primary was "winner-take-all", which was still permitted by the Party's Delegate Selection Rules. Prior to the California primary, Humphrey promised he would not challenge the results if he did not win a plurality of the votes. But he changed course when McGovern won by a 5% margin, thus securing all 273 of their delegates to the convention. Although the anti-McGovern group argued for a proportional distribution of the delegates, the McGovern campaign stressed that the rules for the delegate selection had been set and the Stop McGovern alliance was trying to change the rules after the game. Maneuvering by the McGovern campaign ensued during the convention as they sought to ensure the Democratic nomination despite attempts by the Humphrey campaign and other candidates to block McGovern. In the Credentials Committee, the California McGovern members of the committee were unable to vote on the challenge to their own status. As a result, the Credentials Committee voted to seat California delegates only in proportion to the popular vote. Recognizing that such a result would deprive McGovern the nomination, the McGovern Campaign vigorously backed a challenge to delegates from Chicago who were controlled by Mayor of Chicago Richard J. Daley, arguing that the slating of those delegates prior to the primary violated National Slating Guidelines, which required attempts at diversity. With Illinois Credentials Committee members unable to vote on the challenge to its state's delegates, but the McGovern members of the Committee still able to vote, the Illinois challenge also succeeded, with the seating of a delegation led by Chicago Alderman William S. Singer and civil rights activist Jesse Jackson, which had not won the popular vote, but was pledged to McGovern.

After a bruising and hours-long fight on the Convention floor, the McGovern California and Illinois delegates all were seated, thus leading to McGovern's nomination. This days-long struggle to secure the nomination likely prevented the McGovern campaign from lining up a vice presidential candidate until the day before the nomination had to be made, and may have prevented a full vetting of the nominee.

Most polls showed McGovern running well behind incumbent President Richard Nixon, except when McGovern was paired with Ted Kennedy. McGovern and his campaign brain trust lobbied Senator Kennedy heavily to accept the bid to be McGovern's running mate. Much to their surprise, he continually refused their advances, and instead suggested such figures as House Ways and Means Committee chairman Wilbur Mills of Arkansas and Boston Mayor Kevin White.

Thereafter, a number of high-profile Democrats, including Kennedy, Senator Walter Mondale, former Vice President Hubert Humphrey, Senator Edmund Muskie, Senator Abe Ribicoff, and Senator Birch Bayh turned down offers to run on the ticket. The National Women's Political Caucus urged the selection of a woman such as Representative Shirley Chisholm or, after Chisholm expressed disinterest in the vice presidency, Texas House of Representatives member Sissy Farenthold, but McGovern did not seriously consider choosing a female running mate.

Nevertheless, McGovern and his staff felt that a Kennedy-style figure was needed to balance the ticket: an urban Catholic leader with strong ties to organized labor and other working-to-lower middle class constituencies. McGovern informed Kennedy that he was seriously considering White, who had informed McGovern he was available. Belying his previous support, Kennedy vetoed White when the Massachusetts delegation threatened to boycott the convention due to White's previous endorsement of Muskie.

Once it became apparent that White's candidacy was infeasible, McGovern asked Senator Gaylord Nelson of Wisconsin to be his running mate. Nelson declined but suggested Senator Thomas Eagleton of Missouri, whom McGovern ultimately chose. McGovern's team only conducted minimal vetting of Eagleton, since the senator had been previously recommended by many of the prospective running mates.

Eagleton was relatively unknown to many of the delegates. This, along with the inexperience of many of the delegates who were wary after the protracted infighting, caused the vice presidential balloting to become almost a farce. In addition to Eagleton, the delegates insisted on nominating seven other candidates for vice president, including Senator Mike Gravel of Alaska, former Massachusetts Governor Endicott Peabody, and Farenthold. By the time the roll call finally began, the delegates were in a prankish mood, casting ballots for the fictional Archie Bunker, Martha Beall Mitchell, New Mexico Lt. Governor Roberto Mondragon, and CBS-TV's Roger Mudd.

With hundreds of delegates either actively supporting Nixon or angry at McGovern for one reason or another, the vote was thus chaotic, with votes scattered over 70 candidates. The eventual winner was Eagleton, who accepted the nomination despite not personally knowing McGovern very well, and privately disagreeing with many of McGovern's policies.

Eventually, Eagleton secured the nomination, but the last-day-of-school atmosphere of the proceedings dragged out the process. When Eagleton was at last confirmed, it was 1:40 am (01:40 ET). This delay forced the acceptance speeches of the candidates to be given well past the television prime time hours; McGovern and Eagleton delivered their acceptance speeches at around 3 am (03:00 ET). This probably hurt the McGovern campaign by not creating the so-called "convention bounce".

== General election campaign, 1972 ==
=== Party disunity ===
The McGovern Commission changes to the convention rules marginalized the influence of establishment Democratic figures (some of whom had lost the nomination to McGovern). Many refused to support him, with some switching their support to the incumbent President Richard Nixon through a campaign effort called "Democrats for Nixon". This also had the effect of leaving the McGovern campaign at a significant disadvantage in funding compared to Nixon.

In addition, McGovern was repeatedly attacked by associates of Nixon, including the infamous Watergate break-in, which eventually led to Nixon's resignation in 1974.

=== Eagleton controversy ===
Just over two weeks after his nomination, it was reported that Thomas Eagleton had received electroshock therapy for clinical depression during the 1960s. Eagleton had made no mention of his earlier hospitalizations to McGovern or McGovern's staff, and in fact decided with his wife to keep them secret from McGovern while he was flying to his first meeting with the presidential nominee.

Eagleton had promised to bring his medical records for McGovern's review, but he did not. He initially concealed the fact that he was on Thorazine, a powerful antipsychotic; when he did disclose his use of the medication, he noted that it couldn't be discovered by the press because it was issued under his wife's name. McGovern spoke to two of Eagleton's doctors, both of whom expressed grave concerns about Eagleton's mental health. Ultimately, a portion of Eagleton's medical records was leaked to McGovern, at which point McGovern saw a reference to "manic depression" and "suicidal tendencies."

McGovern had failed to act quickly when he learned of the mental health problems (though not their severe extent) because his own daughter was seriously depressed and he wondered what effect dumping Eagleton because of his depression would have on her. Ultimately, Eagleton threatened that if McGovern tried to force him off the ticket, he would fight the move. Eagleton conditioned his resignation on McGovern's releasing a statement, written by Eagleton, that Eagleton's health was fine and that McGovern had no issues with Eagleton's mental status.

Though many people still supported Eagleton's candidacy, an increasing number of influential politicians and columnists questioned his ability to handle the office of Vice President. McGovern said he would back Eagleton “1000%”, and a Time magazine poll taken at the time found that 77 percent of the respondents said Eagleton's medical record would not affect their vote. Nonetheless, the press made frequent references to his 'shock therapy', and McGovern feared that this would detract from his campaign platform. The episode had placed McGovern in a "no-win" situation. If he kept Eagleton, the selection did not look good for the decision-making ability of the McGovern team, while if he removed Eagleton, he appeared to be weak and vacillating.

McGovern subsequently consulted confidentially with preeminent psychiatrists, including Eagleton's own doctors, who advised him that a recurrence of Eagleton's depression was possible and could endanger the country should Eagleton become president. On August 1, Eagleton withdrew at McGovern's request. This perceived indecisiveness was disastrous for the McGovern campaign.

A new search was begun by McGovern. Kennedy, Muskie, Humphrey and Ribicoff again declined the nomination, as did recent Democratic National Committee Chair and former Postmaster General Larry O'Brien and Florida Governor Reubin Askew. McGovern ultimately chose former United States Ambassador to France and former Peace Corps Director Sargent Shriver, a brother-in-law of the Kennedy brothers and the husband of their sister Eunice. He was officially nominated by a special session of the Democratic National Committee. By this time, McGovern's poll ratings had plunged from 41 to 24 percent.

McGovern's handling of the controversy was an opening for the Republican campaign to raise serious questions about his judgment. The Eagleton controversy also put the McGovern campaign off message and was speculated at the time to perhaps be a harbinger of what would become McGovern's subsequent landslide loss.

=== Watergate ===
Nixon ran a campaign with an aggressive policy of keeping tabs on perceived enemies, and his campaign aides committed the Watergate burglary to steal Democratic Party information during the election.

Nixon's level of personal involvement with the burglary was never clear, but his tactics during the later coverup eventually destroyed his public support after the election and led to his resignation.

=== Issues and strategies ===
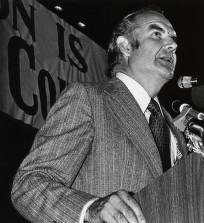
McGovern speaking at a rally at the Miller Outdoor Theatre in Houston, Texas, on October 16, 1972, during the final weeks of the campaign. The sign behind him says "Houston is McGovern Country".

McGovern ran on a platform of ending the Vietnam War and instituting a guaranteed minimum income for the nation's poor. The Vietnam issue, which remained the one McGovern was most passionate about, did not work for him overall; a majority of the electorate thought that Nixon was a strong leader who would secure "peace with honor". McGovern, in contrast, was seen as too strident and too tied to radical elements of the anti-war movement. By 1972, Nixon's strategy of Vietnamization had resulted in the withdrawal of most U.S. troops, without appearing to have given in to the Communists, and thus popular dissatisfaction with the war did not accrue to McGovern's benefit.

Nixon's so-called "southern strategy" of reducing the pressure for school desegregation and otherwise restricting federal efforts on behalf of black people had a powerful attraction to northern blue-collar workers as well as southerners. McGovern called the Watergate burglaries "the kind of thing you expect under a person like Hitler."

=== Final days ===
An infamous incident took place late in the campaign. McGovern was giving a speech and was heckled by a Nixon supporter, to whom he said "Kiss my ass." Shortly thereafter, "KMA" buttons were being worn by people in the crowds at McGovern rallies. Several years later, McGovern observed Mississippi Senator James Eastland looking at him from across the Senate floor and chuckling to himself. He subsequently approached McGovern and asked, "Did you really tell that guy in '72 to kiss your ass?" When McGovern smiled and nodded, Eastland replied, "That was the best line in the campaign."

In the last week of the campaign, Henry Kissinger spoke of the ongoing Paris Peace Talks and said that "We believe that peace is at hand." McGovern angrily responded that Nixon had no plan for ending the war and that U.S. bombers would keep flying.

=== Results ===
The general election was held on November 7. This election had the lowest voter turnout for a presidential election since 1948, with only 55 percent of the electorate voting.

In the election, the McGovern/Shriver ticket suffered a 60.7 percent to 37.5 percent defeat to Nixon and Agnew. At the time, it was the second biggest landslide in American history, with Electoral College totals of 520 to 17. McGovern's two electoral vote victories came in Massachusetts and Washington, D.C.; McGovern failed to win his home state of South Dakota, a state that had delivered for the Democrats in only three of the previous 18 presidential elections in the 20th century. The 1972 election was the first in American history in which a Republican candidate carried every Southern state. Nixon's percentage of the popular vote was only slightly less than Lyndon Johnson's record in the 1964 election, and his margin of victory was slightly larger. Barry Goldwater, who was defeated by Johnson in 1964, sent McGovern a newspaper political cartoon depicting the two of them together "like Grandpa and Granny [patterned after the painting American Gothic] linked by our defeats", with a note scribbled "George – If you must lose, lose big."

In his telegram to Nixon conceding defeat, McGovern wrote, "I hope that in the next four years you will lead us to a time of peace abroad and justice at home. You have my full support in such efforts."

== Primary and general election totals ==
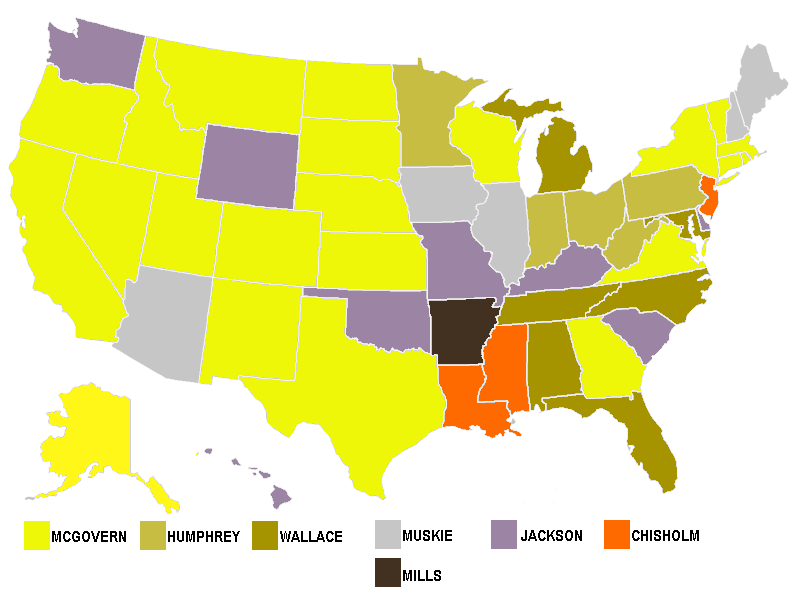
1972 Democratic primaries by state results

1972 presidential election by state results

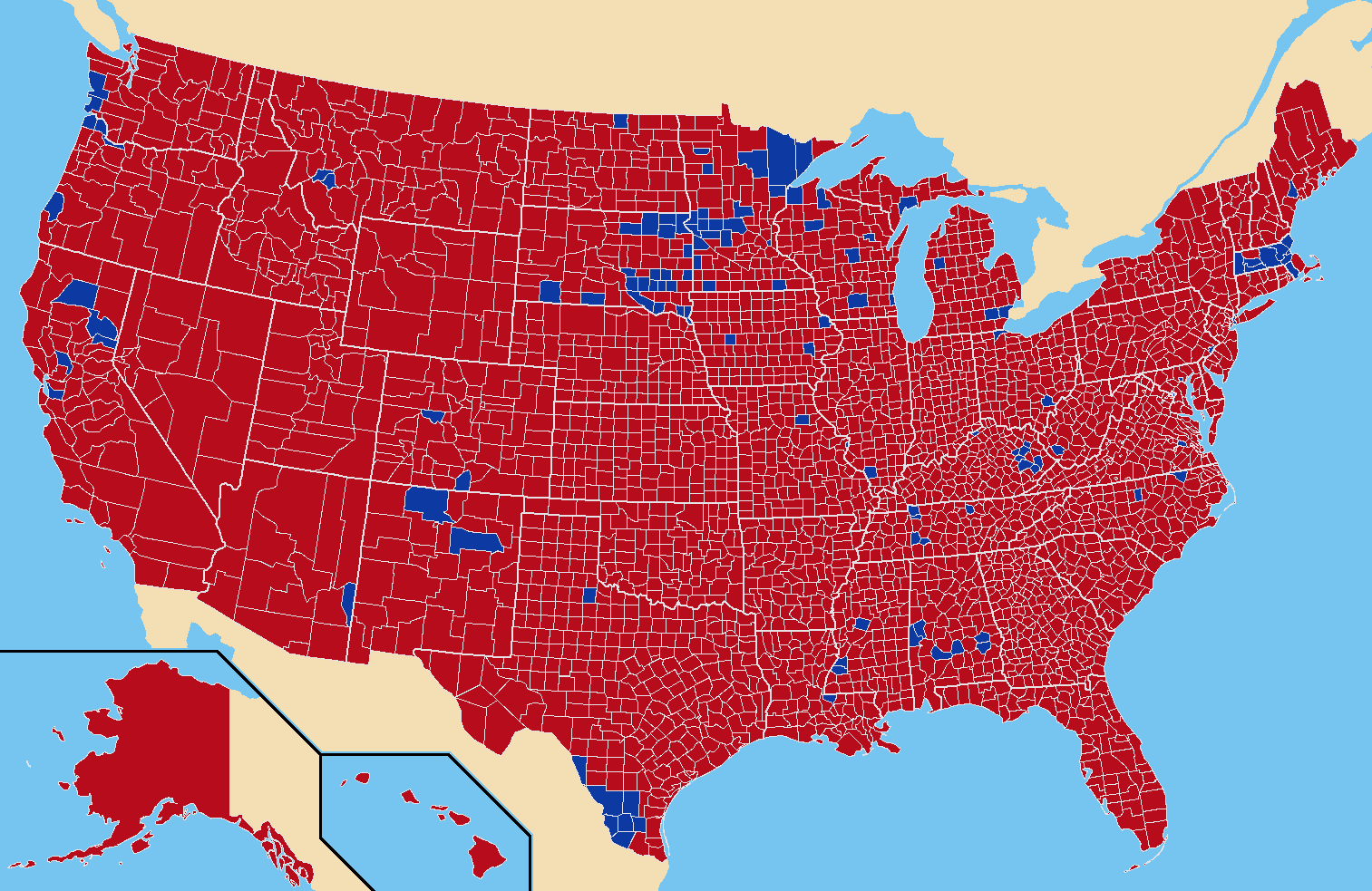
1972 presidential election by county results

1972 Democratic presidential primaries

- Hubert Humphrey – 4,121,372 (25.77%)
- George McGovern – 4,053,451 (25.34%)
- George Wallace – 3,755,424 (23.48%)
- Edmund Muskie – 1,840,217 (11.51%)
- Eugene McCarthy – 553,990 (3.46%)
- Henry M. Jackson – 505,198 (3.16%)
- Shirley Chisholm – 430,703 (2.69%)
- Terry Sanford – 331,415 (2.07%)
- John Lindsay – 196,406 (1.23%)
- Samuel Yorty – 79,446 (0.50%)
- Wilbur Mills – 37,401 (0.23%)
- Walter E. Fauntroy – 21,217 (0.13%)
- Unpledged – 19,533 (0.12%)
- Ted Kennedy – 16,693 (0.10%)
- Vance Hartke – 11,798 (0.07%)
- Patsy Mink – 8,286 (0.05%)
- None – 6,269 (0.04%)

1972 Democratic National Convention (presidential tally):

- George McGovern – 1,729 (57.37%)
- Henry M. Jackson – 525 (17.42%)
- George Wallace – 382 (12.67%)
- Shirley Chisholm – 152 (5.04%)
- Terry Sanford – 78 (2.59%)
- Hubert Humphrey – 67 (2.22%)
- Wilbur Mills – 34 (1.13%)
- Edmund Muskie – 25 (0.83%)
- Ted Kennedy – 13 (0.43%)
- Wayne L. Hays – 5 (0.17%)
- Eugene McCarthy – 2 (0.07%)
- Ramsey Clark – 1 (0.03%)
- Walter Mondale – 1 (0.03%)

1972 Liberal Party Convention (presidential tally):

- George McGovern – 218 (95.61%)
- Benjamin Spock – 8 (3.51%)
- Abstaining – 2 (0.88%)

1972 United States presidential election:

- Richard Nixon/Spiro Agnew (R) (inc.) – 47,168,710 (60.7%) and 520 electoral votes (49 states carried)
- George McGovern/Sargent Shriver (D) – 29,173,222 (37.5%) and 17 electoral votes (1 state and D.C. carried)
- John Hospers/Theodora Nathan (LBT) – 3,674 (0.0%) and 1 electoral vote (Virginia Republican faithless elector)
- John G. Schmitz/Thomas J. Anderson (AI) – 1,100,868 (1.4%)
- Linda Jenness/Andrew Pulley (Socialist Workers) – 83,380 (0.1%)
- Benjamin Spock/Julius Hobson (People's) – 78,759 (0.1%)
- Others – 135,414 (0.2%)

== Celebrity support ==
McGovern's campaign for the presidential nomination, and as the nominee, included fundraising, organizing, benefit appearances and/or other volunteer efforts by numerous celebrities. These included:

- Alan Alda
- Alan Arkin
- Warren Beatty
- Saul Bellow
- Candice Bergen
- Julie Christie
- Bette Davis
- Cass Elliot
- Jules Feiffer
- Ben Gazzara
- Elliott Gould
- Gene Hackman
- Mark Hamill
- Goldie Hawn
- Dustin Hoffman
- James Earl Jones
- Stacy Keach
- Carole King
- Jack Klugman
- Burt Lancaster
- Alan Jay Lerner
- John Lennon
- Myrna Loy
- Shirley MacLaine
- Henry Mancini
- Lee Marvin (though he did not publicly endorse him)
- Elaine May
- Liza Minnelli
- Paul Newman
- Mike Nichols
- Jack Nicholson
- Leonard Nimoy
- Peter, Paul and Mary
- George Plimpton
- Robert Preston
- Harold Prince
- Tony Randall
- Janice Rule
- Diana Sands
- Ray Schoenke
- Simon and Garfunkel
- Neil Simon
- I.F. Stone
- Barbra Streisand
- James Taylor
- Hunter S. Thompson
- Marlo Thomas
- Jon Voight
- Dionne Warwick
- Dennis Weaver
- Raquel Welch
- Andy Williams
- Joanne Woodward
- Neil Diamond

During the campaign, actress Shirley MacLaine authored the book McGovern: The Man and His Beliefs. McGovern later wrote that MacLaine "campaigned virtually nonstop for two years", and that actor Warren Beatty (MacLaine's brother) "broke new ground" in organizing and producing the campaign's benefit concerts.

Beatty produced the all-star concert Four for McGovern featuring Barbra Streisand at the Los Angeles Forum, which grossed $300,000. Other Beatty concerts were held in San Francisco, Lincoln, and Cleveland. In June, Beatty produced the concert Together for McGovern which reunited Simon & Garfunkel and Peter, Paul and Mary. MacLaine headed a concert in October called Star-Spangled Women for McGovern. Actors Dennis Weaver and Candice Bergen presided over an Election Eve rally at Long Beach Airport in California attended by 25,000 people.

The campaign was also assisted by over a hundred well-known professional American football players, organized by Ray Schoenke of the Washington Redskins (Redskins coach George Allen and numerous other sports figures signed a letter supporting President Nixon).

== Legacy ==
After the resignation of Nixon following the Watergate scandal, a bumper sticker became popular: "Don't blame me – I'm from Massachusetts".

McGovern recognized the mixed results of the changes that he made to the Democratic nominating convention, saying, "I opened the doors of the Democratic Party and 20 million people walked out." Despite McGovern's landslide defeat, the Democratic Party did have a more socially and culturally liberal voter base than in the past due in large part to the efforts of McGovern's campaign. In their 2002 book The Emerging Democratic Majority, political scientist Ruy Teixeira and journalist John Judis referred to demographic trends favoring the Democratic Party, such as the party's advantage with women and racial minorities, as "George McGovern's Revenge," as many of those trends had their roots in McGovern's 1972 campaign.

Robert Novak was accused of manufacturing the quote that led to the "amnesty, abortion and acid" label. To rebut the criticism, Novak took Senator Thomas Eagleton to lunch after the campaign and asked whether he could identify Eagleton as the source. The senator said he would not allow his identity to be revealed. "Oh, he had to run for re-election... the McGovernites would kill him if they knew he had said that," Novak said. On July 15, 2007, after the source's death, Novak said on Meet the Press that the unnamed senator was Thomas Eagleton. Political analyst Bob Shrum says that Eagleton would never have been selected as McGovern's running mate if it had been known at the time that Eagleton was the source of the quote: "Boy, do I wish he would have let you publish his name. Then he never would have been picked as vice president. Because the two things, the two things that happened to George McGovern—two of the things that happened to him—were the label you put on him, number one, and number two, the Eagleton disaster. We had a messy convention, but he could have, I think in the end, carried eight or 10 states, remained politically viable. And Eagleton was one of the great train wrecks of all time."

== See also ==
- Fear and Loathing on the Campaign Trail '72
- The Boys on the Bus
- One Bright Shining Moment

== Bibliography ==
- Anson, Robert Sam, McGovern: A Biography, New York: Holt, Rinehart and Winston, 1972. ISBN 0-03-091345-4.
- Boller, Paul F., Presidential Campaigns: from George Washington to George W. Bush, 2nd Edition, Oxford University Press, 2004, ISBN 0195167163.
- Clinton, Bill, My Life, Vintage, 2005. ISBN 1-4000-3003-X.
- Dougherty, Richard, Goodbye, Mr. Christian: A Personal Account of McGovern's Rise and Fall, Garden City, New York: Doubleday & Company, 1973. ISBN 0-385-01546-1.
- Frum, David (2000). How We Got Here: The '70s. New York: Basic Books. ISBN 0-465-04195-7.
- Glasser, Joshua M. (2012). The Eighteen-Day Running Mate: McGovern, Eagleton, and a Campaign in Crisis. New Haven: Yale University Press. ISBN 9780300176292.
- Hart, Gary, Right from the Start: A Chronicle of the McGovern Campaign, New York: Quadrangle, 1973. ISBN 0-8129-0372-2.
- MacLaine, Shirley, McGovern: The Man and His Beliefs, New York: W.W. Norton & Company Limited, 1972.
- Mailer, Norman, St. George and the Godfather, New American Library, 1972.
- Mann, Robert, A Grand Delusion: America's Descent Into Vietnam, New York: Basic Books, 2001. ISBN 0-465-04369-0.
- McGovern, Eleanor, Uphill: A Personal Story, Boston: Houghton Mifflin Company, 1974. ISBN 0-395-19414-8.
- McGovern, George S., Grassroots: The Autobiography of George McGovern, Random House, 1977. ISBN 0-394-41941-3.
- Miroff, Bruce, The Liberals' Moment: The McGovern Insurgency and the Identity Crisis of the Democratic Party, University Press of Kansas, 2007. ISBN 978-0-7006-1546-9.
- Thompson, Hunter S., Fear and Loathing on the Campaign Trail '72, Warner Books, 1973. ISBN 0-446-31364-5.
- Watson, Robert P. (ed.), George McGovern: A Political Life, A Political Legacy, South Dakota State Historical Society Press, 2004. ISBN 0-9715171-6-9.
- Weil, Gordon L., The Long Shot: George McGovern Runs for President, New York: W. W. Norton & Company, 1973. ISBN 0-393-05498-5.
- White, Theodore H., The Making of the President 1968, Antheneum Publishers, 1969.
- White, Theodore H., The Making of the President 1972, Antheneum Publishers, 1973. ISBN 0-689-10553-3.
