= The Golden Rendezvous =

1962 novel by Alistair MacLean

- First edition (UK)
- Author: Alistair MacLean
- Cover artist: John Heseltine
- Language: English
- Genre: Thriller novel
- Publisher: Collins (UK); Doubleday (US)
- Publication date: 1962 (hardcover); 1964 (paperback)
- Publication place: United Kingdom
- Media type: Print (Hardback & Paperback)
- Pages: 223 pp (paperback)
- Preceded by: The Dark Crusader
- Followed by: The Satan Bug

The Golden Rendezvous is a novel written by Scottish author Alistair MacLean, and was first published in 1962. One of MacLean's most popular works, it combines mystery, suspense, action, clever bluffs and double bluffs, with MacLean's trademark self-deprecating wit.

== Plot introduction ==
Aboard the cargo vessel converted into a luxury cruise ship SS Campari somewhere in the Caribbean, all is not well. For Johnny Carter, the Chief Officer, the voyage has already begun badly; a revolution in the small Caribbean nation where the Campari lies in port; a tragedy that causes some passengers to be summoned home, while their places are taken by mysterious newcomers; and even the disappearance of a tactical nuclear missile from an area the ship had just visited. In addition, he suffers from a moody captain and unwanted attention from beautiful young Susan Beresford, traveling with her immensely wealthy family. However, when the Campari sails after a succession of delays attributable to sabotage, he realizes something is seriously wrong. A member of the crew is suddenly missing and the unsuccessful stem-to-stern search only increases tension. Then violence erupts and suddenly the whole ship is endangered by a master criminal whose intention is not a simple hijacking and ransoming of the wealthy hostages on board. The exact nature of his goal forms part of the mystery.

== Film, TV or theatrical adaptations ==
Golden Rendezvous appeared in cinema in a 1977 release directed by Ashley Lazarus. The protagonist, John Carter, was played by Richard Harris, romantic interest Susan Beresford by Ann Turkel, and with Gordon Jackson, David Janssen and Burgess Meredith in supporting roles.

The basic film plot follows that of the book for almost the entire story with only a few differences; for example, in the book Captain Bullen is wounded by gunfire during the taking of the 'Campari,' whilst in the film, Bullen is shot dead. As the book character spent the remainder of the story incapacitated, the plot continued in much the same way without him. However a different ending was scripted for the film in order to increase plot tension and create something far more dramatic and spectacular. The concluding fifteen minutes of the screenplay led to an ending that bore little resemblance to the book plot.

Perhaps because of this deviation from the original story, and any resulting disagreements following its release, the film was later renamed Nuclear Terror.

== Historical background ==
The often-referenced Caribbean island nation which had experienced a Socialist revolution some time before the plot begins, and which suffers from serious economic problems due to sanctions imposed by the US, is clearly Cuba, with its leader, "The Generalissimo", being Fidel Castro – though neither name is ever mentioned explicitly.

An older historical reference, from which the book's name derives, is to the fabulous Spanish treasure fleets of the 17th and 18th centuries, which attracted the attention of English pirates during the Golden Age of Piracy. In the book is depicted a reversal of the historical linguistic roles, with 20th-century Spanish-speaking pirates seeking to loot a large consignment of gold ingots being secretly transported between the United States and Britain.

== Reception ==
The Observer called the book "a bit crude and crazy; reminds you rather of a serial in a boys newspaper at the turn of the century." The Los Angeles Times said that "for pure undiluted excitement with constant fun along the way, Golden Rendezvous is a runaway success."

The book became a best seller.
