= Golden Rendezvous =

- DVD cover
- Directed by: Ashley Lazarus
- Written by: Alistair MacLean (novel); Allan Scott; Chris Bryant; John Gay; Stanley Price
- Produced by: Murray Frank; Andre Pieterse; Robert Porter
- Starring: Richard Harris; Ann Turkel; David Janssen; Gordon Jackson; Burgess Meredith; Dorothy Malone; John Vernon; John Carradine; Leigh Lawson; Robert Flemyng; Keith Baxter; Robert Beatty
- Cinematography: Kenneth Higgins
- Edited by: Ralph Kemplen
- Music by: Jeff Wayne
- Distributed by: United Artists (USA); Rank Film Distributors (UK)
- Release date: 1 December 1977 (United Kingdom)
- Running time: 109 minutes (theatrical release)
- Country: United Kingdom/South Africa
- Language: English

Golden Rendezvous is a 1977 South African action thriller film directed by Ashley Lazarus and starring Richard Harris, Ann Turkel and David Janssen. It was based on the 1962 novel The Golden Rendezvous by Alistair MacLean.

== Plot ==
The Caribbean Star, a combination cargo ship and floating casino is hijacked by terrorists led by Luis Carreras (John Vernon), who installs an atomic bomb, holding both the passengers and the bomb hostage, hoping to exchange them for the gold bullion on a U.S. Treasury ship. However, First Officer John Carter (Richard Harris), Susan Beresford (Ann Turkel), and Dr. Marston (Gordon Jackson) join forces to foil the plan.

== Cast ==
- Richard Harris – John Carter
- Ann Turkel – Susan Beresford
- David Janssen – Charles Conway
- Burgess Meredith – Van Heurden
- Gordon Jackson – Dr. Marston
- John Vernon – Luis Carreras
- Dorothy Malone – Mrs. Skinner
- Leigh Lawson – Tony Cerdan
- John Carradine – Fairweather
- Robert Flemyng – Capt. Bullen
- Keith Baxter – Preston
- Robert Beatty – Dr. Taubman
- Chris Chittell – Rogers
- Michael Howard – Benson
- Ian Yule – McCloskey
- Larry Taylor – Attacker

== Development ==
The novel was originally published in 1962. Film rights were bought almost immediately; Laurence Harvey announced he would star and produce along with Daniel Angel. "I think it's easily as exciting as Guns of Navarone", said Harvey.

However the film was not made until 1977. It starred Richard Harris and Ann Turkel, who were then married, and who had just appeared in The Cassandra Crossing together. Harris praised Turkel for encouraging him to cut down on his drinking. "Now my creativity is flowing again", he said. "Now in the middle of the night I must suddenly get up and write. I'm not going to end up like [Dylan] Thomas, lonely and misunderstood."

=== Differences from Novel ===
The basic film plot follows that of the book for almost the entire story with only a few differences; for example, in the book Captain Bullen is wounded by gunfire during the taking of the 'Campari'(Caribbean Star) whilst in the film, Bullen is shot dead. As the book character spent the remainder of the story incapacitated, the plot continued in much the same way without him. Similarly Dr. Taubman's character possessed a wife who was absent from the novel, as were David Janssen's character of Charles Conway, and Burgess Meredith's character Van Heurden. However a different ending was scripted for the film in order to increase plot tension and create something far more dramatic and spectacular. The final fifteen minutes of the screenplay led to a conclusion that bore little resemblance to the book plot.

Perhaps because of this deviation from the original story, and any resulting disagreements following its release, the film was later renamed 'Nuclear Terror.'

=== Production ===
The film was shot in South Africa. The film was started by Freddie Francis but completed by Ashley Lazarus.

The film went $1.5 million over budget. This was blamed on Richard Harris who, it was alleged, held up production with his drinking and rewriting of the script. Producer Euan Lloyd later discovered this was not entirely true – however, it made it difficult for Lloyd to cast Harris in his next film, The Wild Geese.

Harris admitted rewriting the script but says he was invited to do so. "I worked 20 hours a day, 7 days a week, helping to get them out of a hole. And at the end I got slammed for it. Worse – found myself uninsurable. Even after the film opened in Europe, I still didn't give up. I said 'Let me take 10 minutes out and put back some stuff and I promise you it'll work.' But they weren't interested. And so we're left with another Harris flop."

== Release ==
After the European release, a six-minute prologue was shot to make the plot more explicable.

The movie performed poorly at the box office.

The Guardian called the film "nothing but dross".

The film was re-edited and distributed as a TV movie on U.S. networks with the title Nuclear Terror. To get the film's duration down to the required 95–100 minutes most of the pre-title sequence was cut.

== Scandal ==
The film was tied up in a South African political scandal after a Supreme Court judge made public evidence of corruption and the misappropriation of millions of pound of public funds. Mr Justice Anton, Mostert was undertaking a one-man Commission of Inquiry into exchange control conventions, when he announced he had uncovered corruption, mostly the using of US$13.8 million (£8.6 million) in government funds to set up The Citizen, an English-language newspaper that would support the government. The scandal led to the resignation of Prime Minister John Vorster.

In addition, $5 million was transferred from a Swiss bank to a South African company called Thor Communicators, some of which was used as security for loans to make Golden Rendezvous.

Prime Minister Pieter Botha set up an official inquiry to investigate the allegations.

Producer Andre Pieterse admitted that 825,000 rand (£475,000) was transferred to him to create a film industry for blacks in South Africa. This would involve the production of ideological films, the distribution of films from abroad acceptable to South African blacks, and the construction chain of cinemas for blacks. However, due to difficulties with other government departments, the project was never realised and the money instead wound up in Golden Rendezvous.

Money for the film had been raised in South Africa but backers dropped out shortly before production had begun. Pieterse had already sold the distribution rights to the as-yet-unmade film in thirty two countries for a total of 2.5 million rand; if the film was not made he risked being sued and being stuck with a bill for wages for the cast and crew. So Pieterse refinanced the project through an American bank, Chemical, under stringer terms which resulted in another million dollars being added to the budget. Pieterse was allowed to use the government money to secure finance for the loan for Golden Rendezvous. Eschel Rhoodie was the head of the Department of Information at the time and a friend of Pieterse's. Pieterse:

I explained to Rhoodie the situation, the fact the I would be personally ruined, that the industry could be badly damaged, and talked him into employing 825,000 rand which at that stage was on fixed deposit with Barclays Bank — to allow me to employ it as security for the production loan. I was convinced, and I put it to him, that this situation would not be called, because the film was properly insured against completion, and when we completed it, we were certain that the foreign, American rights would be sow for at least enough money to meet the obligations of production, then this 825,000 rand would serve only as security till that time. Unfortunately for me the production got further out of hand, and the film far exceeded the budget.

Pieterse says filming ran into trouble because of difficulties involved in shooting on a ship, and because Richard Harris drank a bottle of vodka a day.

Pieterse alleged that these things caused filming to be delayed by 44 days and meant that the producer was unable to raise capital abroad, and make a sale to North America.

Pieterse later sought $1.5 million in damages from Harris. Harris was then making Game for Vultures in South Africa and a warrant was issued for his arrest by a Johannesburg court. Harris responded, "Mr Pieterse owes me money, not I him", claiming he was owed $50,000, and that Pieterse's comments were "totally untrue and completely defamatory."

Sheriffs failed to serve a warrant of arrest on Harris and it was reported that the parties were working on a settlement. "I don't believe that in a country like South Africa that they will arrest a gentleman like me", said Harris.

"I'd be a fool to deny I had a drink", said Harris. "But when I was drinking I never let it get in the way of my work. Everybody on that film was drinking, we were all so fucking miserable."

Harris threatened to sue for defamation and the matter never went to court.

Pieterse did succeed in selling the film to Time-Life for syndication for 525,000 rand.
