= The Fear (1995 film) =

American horror film in the year 1995

- Promotional poster
- Directed by: Vincent Robert
- Written by: Ron Ford
- Produced by: Richard Brandes
- Starring: Eddie Bowz; Darin Heames; Leland Hayward; Vince Edwards; Ann Turkel
- Edited by: Bernd Heinl
- Music by: Robert O. Ragland
- Release date: January 20, 1995
- Running time: 98 minutes
- Country: United States
- Language: English

The Fear is a 1995 American psychological horror film directed by Vincent Robert and starring Vince Edwards in his final film role, along with Eddie Bowz, Darin Heames, Leland Hayward, and Ann Turkel. Its plot follows a group of dysfunctional young adults who take a weekend retreat to a remote cabin, where they become threatened by a living wooden mannequin.

== Plot ==
A group of dysfunctional university students take a weekend retreat as part of a thesis study for Richard Strand, a psychology student studying fear, at his family's rural vacation cabin. Upon arrival, the group find a life-size wooden mannequin, "Morty," in the house. Richard reveals that Morty was a childhood toy of his, and he intends to use Morty as a soundboard for each of the individuals to confess their fears to. Only Richard's girlfriend, Ashley, is reluctant to participate.

Richard conducts a group session in which the participants explain their fears to Morty. Troy, a joking stoner, laughs off the exercise, though Leslie, Troy's elder foster sister, admits her fear of aging, while Vance declares his greatest fear is poverty. Richard's uncle Pete unexpectedly arrives, interrupting the session, with his younger girlfriend, Tanya. Pete invites himself to stay, despite Richard's insistence that the group remain a controlled study. Later that night, Tanya confesses her fear of water to Morty, while Mindy admits her fear of heights; Mindy's boyfriend, Gerald, tells her in private that he fears religion, as he was raised by a Christian zealot. Richard himself admits to Morty that he is afraid of commitment, and cites his mother's death in the cabin as a significant childhood trauma.

Tanya has a breakthrough with Richard, in which he reveals her fear of water is actually a metaphor for her fear of emotions, which he surmises based on Jungian theory. Meanwhile, Morty begins to surface inexplicably in different places at the cabin, posed outside windows and in the hot tub. When Richard accuses Ashley of placing Morty in the hot tub to frighten Tanya, Ashley returns his engagement ring to him. When asked where Morty came from, Richard recounts how his grandfather acquired Morty from a Native American man who carved the mannequin for him.

The group go out for a night out at a local Christmas-themed amusement park owned by Uncle Pete. Mindy is attacked in the park by an unseen assailant and raped. Gerald goes missing, and the group suspect their troubled acquaintance, Vance, is responsible, as he has made numerous sexual advances toward Mindy; furthermore, Ashley believes Vance could be the unknown rapist who has been sexually assaulting women on campus.

Vance flees back to the cabin with the intention of stealing money he suspects is concealed in the house. Upon arriving, he discovers the money beneath a floor hatch, but is killed by an unseen assailant and dragged under. The others arrive shortly after, but cannot locate Vance, and subsequently find their tires slashed. Pete and Tanya leave to the Christmas Village to obtain a vehicle, but become separated. Upon arriving at the park, Pete finds Gerald's crucified body in one of the buildings.

Meanwhile, at the cabin, Troy attempts to initiate sex with Leslie, but stops when Leslie implies she is Troy's biological mother. Traumatized, Troy flees into the woods. Leslie follows, only to find Morty dressed in Troy's clothes; in a matter of moments, Leslie quickly ages. Richard, after checking on Mindy, finds her apparently possessed, and able to animate Morty. Speaking through Mindy, Morty accuses Richard of causing his mother's death: Richard's father murdered her after Richard found her in bed with a lover, and buried her body in the woods. Richard and Mindy's physical fight ends with him throwing her out a window to her death.

Ashley flees the cabin, and encounters Troy in the woods, who reveals himself to be the campus rapist. He attempts to assault her, but Ashley kills him by striking him with a large branch. Uncle Pete returns to the cabin alone, and Richard explains his recollection of how his mother was killed. Pete denies this occurred, but Richard subsequently realizes Pete was the one having the affair with his mother, after spotting a matching tattoo on his shoulder. Ashley and Richard flee the cabin, with an animated Morty pursuing them. In the woods, Richard confronts his mother's grave, facing his greatest fear. They subsequently save Tanya, who is being attacked by Morty. Richard and Morty face off, and Morty relents, calmly walking into a pond and disappearing into the water.

Sometime later, the cabin is put up to sale and is visited by a real estate agent and a couple. Their son Corey disappears deep into the woods while playing with his soccer ball. After throwing his soccer ball out of view, Corey comes across Morty, having returned from the water and covered in lake weeds. They stare for a tense moment. After being asking if he is a good guy or bad guy, Morty kicks the soccer ball back to Corey.

== Cast ==
- Eddie Bowz as Richard Strand
- Heather Medway as Ashley
- Ann Turkel as Leslie
- Vince Edwards as Uncle Pete
- Darin Heames as Troy
- Anna Karin as Tanya
- Antonio Todd as Gerald
- Leland Hayward as Vance
- Monique Mannen as Mindy
- Erick Weiss as "Morty"
- Wes Craven as Dr. Arnold

== Release ==
The film was released theatrically on January 20, 1995, in Fresno, California.

=== Home media ===
The Fear was released on LaserDisc by A-Pix Entertainment. It was also released on VHS and DVD. The film was released on Blu-ray by Vinegar Syndrome in 2021.

== Soundtrack ==
The film is notable for its early Horrorcore soundtrack, which includes the title track The Fear (Morty's Theme) by Esham and early tracks by several pioneering horrorcore groups. Although previous horror films had included individual horrorcore tracks (for example, the Fat Boys' "Are You Ready for Freddy" for the film A Nightmare on Elm Street 4: The Dream Master), The Fear was the first film to try and capitalize on the burgeoning genre with a soundtrack completely devoted to it (with a 2013 LA Weekly article claiming the VHS box art "plugged the music, saying its soundtrack would do for horrorcore 'what Singles did for Grunge'"). It was released by Warlock Records.

=== Track listing ===
No.	Title	Artist	Length
1.	"The Fear (Morty's Theme)"	Esham	4:01
2.	"Black Peter"	Half Pit & Machete	4:25
3.	"Here Come The Gravediggaz"	Gravediggaz	3:46
4.	"Necrophobia"	Headless Horsemen	4:13
5.	"Better Off Dead"	Half Pit Half Dead	4:21
6.	"Life After Death"	Natas	4:14
7.	"Fear Flesh & Blood"	Machete	4:14
8.	"Graveyard Tales"	Terror	3:31
9.	"Dead Body Man"	Insane Clown Posse	4:03
10.	"Rocks Off"	Esham	3:21
11.	"Infared's Terror"	Infared	4:54
12.	"Run"	Flatlinerz	3:26
13.	"Sweet & Saxy (A Moment Of Calm Before You Die)"	Kim Waters	4:22
