= Ravagers (film) =

- U.S. theatrical release poster
- Directed by: Richard Compton
- Screenplay by: Donald S. Sanford
- Based on: novel A Path to Savagery by Robert Edmond Alter
- Produced by: John W. Hyde executive Saul David
- Starring: Richard Harris; Ernest Borgnine; Ann Turkel; Art Carney
- Cinematography: Vincent Saizis
- Edited by: Maury Winetrobe
- Music by: Fred Karlin
- Production company: Cinecorp
- Distributed by: Columbia Pictures
- Release date: May 1979
- Running time: 87 minutes
- Country: United States
- Language: English
- Budget: $4 million

Ravagers is a 1979 American science fiction action film directed by Richard Compton and based on the 1966 novel Path to Savagery by Robert Edmond Alter. The screenplay concerns survivors of a nuclear holocaust, who do what they can to protect themselves against ravagers, a mutated group of vicious marauders who terrorize the few remaining civilized inhabitants.

== Plot ==
In the aftermath of a nuclear holocaust, animal-like creatures known as "the ravagers" roam the earth and kill all survivors. A man named Falk (Richard Harris) witnesses his wife's murder by the creatures. Seeking vengeance, Falk becomes a vigilante.

He joins a small community, led by Rann (Ernest Borgnine), living aboard a ship anchored off shore. The ship is destroyed in an attack by the ravagers. Falk then leads his fellow survivors on a desperate quest for a place where they can live in peace.

== Cast ==
- Richard Harris as Falk
- Ernest Borgnine as Rann
- Anthony James as Ravager leader
- Art Carney as Sergeant
- Ann Turkel as Faina
- Alana Stewart as Miriam
- Woody Strode as Brown
- Seymour Cassel as Blind Lawyer
- Harvey Evans as Prison Guard
- Arch Archambault as Ravager #1
- Olivia Barton as Mushroom Woman
- Kate Bray as Grace
- Billy Carmack as Thug with Sickle
- Brian Carney as Foy
- Kim Crow as Flocker Woman
- Bob Westmoreland as Hank
- Kurt Grayson as Coop
- Gordon Hyde as Bert
- Steve Lashley as Ravager #2
- George Stokes as Bant
- Andre Tayir as Prisoner

== Production ==
The film was shot at the Alabama Space and Rocket Center and at the "Three Caves Quarry" at the base of Monte Sano Mountain in Huntsville, Alabama. The Three Caves location is unique because it was one of the first limestone quarries in Alabama and for a brief time in 1962 a possible fallout shelter.

== Releases ==
Ravagers is part of a long line of Hollywood-backed post-apocalyptic films from the 1970s, many of which are difficult to find on television or home video. In the UK, the film was released on Betamax and VHS, where Alana Stewart's voice was dubbed by actress Molly Wryn.

== Reception ==
The Los Angeles Times called Ravagers "handsomely produced but relentlessly dull... doesn't have enough story to tell."
