= The Satan Bug (novel) =

1962 novel by Alistair MacLean

- First edition (UK)
- Author: Alistair MacLean (pseudonym Ian Stuart)
- Cover artist: John Heseltine
- Language: English
- Genre: Thriller novel
- Publisher: Collins (UK); Scribner (US)
- Publication date: 1962
- Publication place: United Kingdom
- Media type: Print (Hardback & Paperback)
- Pages: 256
- Preceded by: The Golden Rendezvous
- Followed by: Ice Station Zebra

The Satan Bug is a first-person narrative thriller novel written by Scottish author Alistair MacLean. It was originally published in 1962 under the pseudonym Ian Stuart, and later republished under MacLean's own name.

== Plot ==
The story revolves around the theft of two germ warfare agents, botulinum toxin and the indestructible "Satan Bug" (a laboratory-conceived derivative of poliovirus), from the Mordon Microbiological Research Establishment (similar to Porton Down). There is no vaccine for the "Satan Bug" and it is so infectious that any release will rapidly destroy all human life on Earth. With these phials of unstoppable power, a mad "environmentalist" threatens the country's population unless Mordon is razed to the ground.

Like other of MacLean's works, the plot involves layers of deception. The first-person narrator, Pierre Cavell, is initially presented as an embittered figure who has been successively fired for insubordination from the British Army, the Metropolitan Police Service, and finally from Mordon. Cavell is called in by former colleagues at Special Branch after being "tested" with a bribe to ensure that he is still honest. The novel gradually reveals that for the past 16 years Cavell has in fact been working for "the General", apparently a senior intelligence director and Cavell's father-in-law, and that these thefts are the culmination of a series of security breaches at Mordon that Cavell and the General have been investigating for at least a year.

During the theft the current head of security is killed with a cyanide-laced sweet, presumably given to him by an insider he trusted. A variety of scientists and support staff come under suspicion, and it emerges that several of them have been coerced by blackmail or kidnapping to help the principal villain, without knowing his identity. The villain releases botulinum toxin over an evacuated area of East Anglia, killing hundreds of livestock and proving that his threat to use the Satan Bug should be taken seriously. He takes Cavell's wife, Mary, hostage and sets off to London to blackmail the British government by threatening to release the "Satan Bug" in the City of London's financial district. The villain uses his hostage to capture Cavell and several police officers and attempts to kill them with botulinum toxin. Cavell escapes, though one constable is poisoned and dies rapidly. (For dramatic purposes this is from convulsions like nerve agent or strychnine poisoning, rather than the slower paralysis and respiratory failure usually associated with botulism.)

Cavell uses Interpol to discover the villain's true identity and infers that the villain's London plan is really to cause the City of London to be evacuated, allowing a criminal gang time to break into and rob major banks and then escape by helicopter. After losing a fight on board the aircraft, the villain explains his motives and jumps to his death, leaving the remaining phials of agent unbreached.

== Release details ==
- 1962, UK
- 1962, US, Scribner's, hardback

== Theatrical adaptation ==
- The novel was loosely adapted as a 1965 film, directed by John Sturges, with James Clavell contributing to the screenplay. The film starred George Maharis, Richard Basehart and Anne Francis.
