= Beetlejuice Beetlejuice (soundtrack) =

2024 film soundtrack

Beetlejuice Beetlejuice (Original Motion Picture Soundtrack)

Soundtrack album by various artists
- Released: August 30, 2024
- Recorded: 2023–2024
- Length: 52:24
- Label: WaterTower Music

Singles from Beetlejuice Beetlejuice (Original Motion Picture Soundtrack)
- 1. "Day-O" Released: May 23, 2024

Beetlejuice Beetlejuice (Original Motion Picture Soundtrack) is the soundtrack to the 2024 film Beetlejuice Beetlejuice, directed by Tim Burton. A sequel to Beetlejuice (1988), the film stars Michael Keaton (as the title character), Winona Ryder, and Catherine O'Hara reprising their roles alongside new cast members Justin Theroux, Monica Bellucci, Jenna Ortega, and Willem Dafoe.

The film score is composed by regular Burton collaborator Danny Elfman and the soundtrack featured licensed songs heard in the film and two of Elfman's score cues. The soundtrack was released through WaterTower Music on August 30, 2024, a week ahead of the film's release.

== Background and release ==
The soundtrack incorporated licensed music as heard in the film. The traditional Jamaican folk song "Day-O (The Banana Boat Song)" was featured in the first film and was also included in the sequel. This song was covered by Alfie Davis and the Sylvia Young Theatre School Choir and was featured in the first trailer released on May 23, 2024. The same day, WaterTower Music released the cover as a digital single.

The soundtrack was released through WaterTower Music on August 30, 2024. Waxwork Records issued a deluxe edition double LP album set for pre-order on September 9, 2024, and expected to be issued online and in stores in November 2024. This edition featured the complete track list pressed in a 180-gram "Beetlejuice Splatter" (violet and green) colored vinyl along with a Sandworm etched on side-D, with an artwork by Phantom City Creative packaged in a matte satin coated gatefold sleeve with a 11-inch art print, handbook and liner notes.

== Track listing ==
Beetlejuice Beetlejuice (Original Motion Picture Soundtrack) track listing
No.	Title	Artist(s)	Length
1.	"MacArthur Park" (single version)	Donna Summer	3:55
2.	"Tragedy"	Bee Gees	5:01
3.	"Day-O"	Alfie Davis and the Sylvia Young Theatre School Choir	2:52
4.	"Somedays"	Tess Parks	2:40
5.	"Cry, Cry"	Mazzy Star	3:59
6.	"Where's the Man" (2023 remaster)	Scott Weiland	5:12
7.	"Right Here Waiting"	Richard Marx	4:28
8.	"Svefn-g-englar"	Sigur Rós	10:06
9.	"MacArthur Park"	Richard Harris	7:24
10.	"Main Title from Carrie"	Pino Donaggio	2:51
11.	"Main Title Theme"	Danny Elfman	3:20
12.	"End Titles"	Danny Elfman	4:35
Total length:			56:23

== Beetlejuice Beetlejuice (Score from the Original Motion Picture Soundtrack) ==
Beetlejuice Beetlejuice (Score from the Original Motion Picture Soundtrack)

Film score by Danny Elfman
- Released: October 25, 2024
- Recorded: 2023–2024
- Length: 45:57
- Label: WaterTower Music

Danny Elfman chronology
White Noise (2022)	Beetlejuice Beetlejuice (Score from the Original Motion Picture Soundtrack) (2024)	Dracula (2025)

Singles from Beetlejuice Beetlejuice
- 1. "Main Title Theme (from "Beetlejuice Beetlejuice")" Released: September 6, 2024

The film score is composed by regular Burton collaborator Danny Elfman. The score was released through WaterTower Music on October 25, 2024. Vinyl and CD releases were initially slated to come out in early 2025, but were made available for pre-order on June 20, 2025.

=== Track listing ===
All music is composed by Danny Elfman.

No.	Title	Length
1.	"Main Title Theme (From "Beetlejuice Beetlejuice)"	3:21
2.	"Ghost Host"	1:45
3.	"Plane Crash"	0:59
4.	"Boo"	1:23
5.	"Going to Beetlejuice"	1:12
6.	"Day-O (From "Beetlejuice Beetlejuice)" (Alfie Davis and the Sylvia Young Theatre School Choir)	2:53
7.	"Ghost That Matters"	2:00
8.	"Ex-Wife's Back"	2:34
9.	"Gallery Performance"	0:48
10.	"Obituary"	0:40
11.	"The Attic"	3:22
12.	"In the Model"	0:39
13.	"Ghost Story"	1:27
14.	"Snake Ceremony"	0:56
15.	"Beetlejuice Returns"	2:28
16.	"You Agreed to Swap Lives"	2:50
17.	"Saturn"	1:11
18.	"Out of Luck"	1:09
19.	"Deila Calls Beetlejuice"	1:22
20.	"Selfies Gone Wrong"	0:42
21.	"Dolores Interrupts"	1:01
22.	"Beetlejuice Balloons"	0:59
23.	"Delia Departs"	1:07
24.	"What's That?"	0:45
25.	"End Titles (From "Beetlejuice Beetlejuice)"	4:36
26.	"Waiting Room (More of a Dog Person)"	1:09
27.	"Waiting Room (Delia)"	0:39
28.	"Waiting Room (You're Dead, Ok?)"	0:53
29.	"Waiting Room – Bonus Track"	1:32
Total length:		45:57

== Reception ==
Wendy Ide of The Guardian wrote that "[Elfman's] contribution to the score of Beetlejuice Beetlejuice is archetypically Elfmanesque, sounding as though it's played by an orchestra of frenzied skeletons", but found the music choices to be a hit and miss. Owen Gleiberman of Variety described the score as "jumpy ghost music" and called the cover of "Day-O" and the musical sequence as "spectacular". Dana Stevens of Slate called it as a "zippy score".

David Rooney of The Hollywood Reporter wrote that Elfman's score "has all the qualities of his collaborative peak with Burton plus distinctive new flavors". Ty Burr of The Washington Post wrote "Danny Elfman's musical score, a character in its own right, returns like a runaway calliope." Mireia Mullor of Digital Spy wrote "Along with Danny Elfman's playful score, the movie includes glorious needle drops, with hits ranging from the Bee Gees' 'Tragedy' to Richard Marx's 'Wherever You Go, Whatever You Do'."

== Charts ==
Chart performance for Beetlejuice Beetlejuice (Original Motion Picture Soundtrack)
Chart (2024)	Peak position
Belgian Albums (Ultratop Wallonia)	180
UK Album Downloads (Official Charts)	46
UK Soundtrack Albums (Official Charts)	14

== Release history ==
Release dates and formats for Beetlejuice Beetlejuice (Original Motion Picture Soundtrack)
Region	Date	Format(s)	Label	Ref.
Various	August 30, 2024	Digital download; streaming	WaterTower Music	
Various	November 15, 2024	Vinyl and CD	Waxwork Records	
