= Deep Space (film) =

- Directed by: Fred Olen Ray
- Written by: Fred Olen Ray; T.L. Lankford
- Produced by: Alan Amiel
- Starring: Charles Napier; Ann Turkel; Bo Svenson; Ron Glass; Julie Newmar
- Cinematography: Gary Graver
- Edited by: Bruce Stubblefield; Natan Zahavi
- Music by: Alan Oldfield; Robert O. Ragland
- Production company: Trans World Entertainment
- Distributed by: Trans World Entertainment (U.S.)
- Release date: April 14, 1988 (video)
- Running time: 91 minutes
- Country: United States
- Language: English
- Budget: $1.5–2 million

Deep Space is a 1988 sci-fi horror film directed by Fred Olen Ray, starring Charles Napier, Ann Turkel and Bo Svenson. Napier stars as a cop trying to stop the murderous rampage of an escaped creature engineered by the government.

== Plot ==
A team working on a U.S.military satellite program under the direction of head scientist Forsythe loses control of a precious satellite. They realize that they can not prevent its crash on earth within the next two hours. Upon impact, the satellite breaks open, but its contents remain inert. Forsythe informs the officer in charge, General Randolph, of the situation. The satellite contains a biological weapon of a whole new genre, an actual sentient creature nicknamed "Sentar". Randolph wants the beast destroyed via its remote emergency system, but Forsythe is reluctant and minimizes the risks, arguing that there is little risk that it will wake up. However, a couple passing by disturbs the creature's sleep, and get killed after setting it loose.

The monster escapes towards Los Angeles and begins to terrorize the citizens. Meanwhile, veteran police lieutenant Ian McLemore is introduced to a newly transferred colleague from Atlanta, Carla Sandbourn, with whom he sympathizes. Their superior, Captain Robertson, attempts to dissuade Sandbourn from working with McLemore, as the latter has the reputation of getting involved in dangerous situations from which he always seems to come out unscathed, while his partners seldom live to tell the tale. McLemore is informed of an incoming call from a woman who claims to be a psychic and needs to talk to him, but refuses to take it. Instead he leaves for Innsmouth Road, where a double homicide scene has been discovered, with his regular partner Jerry Merris. There, they find a large pod that seems to be made of a hard, yet organic material, as well as several similar but smaller objects.

McLemore insists that he and Jerry steal two of the smaller pods and take them home to investigate further, as he fears a cover-up is afoot. Meanwhile the large one is taken to the local forensics lab, but during the night, the examiner, Rogers, is hacked to pieces by an unknown force. Testing also reveals that fragments of an unknown metal retrieved from the crime scene do not match any known material. When they attempt to return to the crime scene, McLemore and Merris are barred from entering by Military Police members, led by a mysterious suit who points his gun at them. Later, they see the same man exiting Robertson's office, who soon after informs them that the deaths have been ruled accidental, despite blatant evidence of the contrary. Back at his home, McLemore receives another call from the psychic who had earlier tried to contact him at the police station. The woman, named Lady Elaine Wentworth, claims to know what happened the previous night.

Sanbourn joins McLemore and they enjoy a date. McLemore remembers his pod and the two go to an entomologist that McLemore knew from a previous encounter, taking the pod. The pod is drilled open and hatches, with the creature inside attacking the entomologist and Sanbourn. The creature is destroyed in a terrarium filled with a gas. After the entomologist is wheeled away by the paramedics, McLemore recalls Merris' pod. He and Sanbourn go to Merris' home, to find that the pod has hatched and Merris has been killed. A chase ensues and the second creature is finally killed.

Lady Elaine calls Merris' home to tell McLemore where the original creature is. McLemore and Sandbourn find the location, and Sanbourn calls for backup. The creature eventually fights McLemore, and is winning until Sanbourn and Robertson, who has just arrived, attack. The distraction allows McLemore to decapitate the creature with a chainsaw.

== Cast ==
- Charles Napier as Detective Ian McLemore
- Ann Turkel as Carla Sandbourn
- Bo Svenson as Captain Robertson
- Ron Glass as Jerry Merris
- Julie Newmar as Lady Elaine Wentworth
- James Booth as Dr. Forsyth
- Norman Burton as General Randolph
- Jesse Dabson as Jason
- Elisabeth Brooks as Mrs. Ridley
- Anthony Eisley as Dr. Rogers

== Production ==
The film was originally going to be a sequel to William Malone's minor 1985 hit Creature, but director Fred Olen Ray hated the script and suggested filming one of his own instead. The director just happened to have an alien story written six years prior laying in his personal archive. The main character was originally the same as the one in Bulletproof, with the story written around him later tweaked to meet the needs of that film's producer. True to his habit, Ray peppered the film with short appearances by veteran character players. When he reached out to Anthony Eisley, the actor was shocked to learn that B-movie connoisseur Ray had cast him because he had loved him in The Mummy and the Curse of the Jackals, which he considered one of his worst films.

Filming started on April 20, 1987. After principal photography, Trans World executives called for reshoots. While they pushed for more similarities with Alien in some areas, they also ordered the addition of a military conspiracy against Ray's wishes, making the monster a man-engineered bioweapon rather than an actual extraterrestrial, as was the case in the original screenplay. The additional sessions took seven days and required building new sets, as well as filming five different endings that the producers could choose from, which the notoriously frugal helmer regarded as needless spending. The film ended up costing more than $1.5 million or closer to $2 million, depending on estimates.

The make-up and creature effects were done by a Sirius Effects team headed by Steve Neill, who had previously worked on the similar Galaxy of Terror and Forbidden World. According to Ray, the effects on Deep Space cost more than the entire budget of most of his earlier pictures. Sirius employee T. Dow Albon mentioned finding Ray's directorial approach rather unorthodox, as he shot the monster's chainsaw death scene despite some close-ups still being scheduled for the next day. Another mishap involved a botched car setpiece. Ray was also displeased with the film's score. All in all, the director felt that the film generally held up, but was disappointed with it given its relatively hefty budget.

== Release ==
According to a press release for a Charles Napier signing, the film was originally projected for an August 1987 release. By January 1988, Deep Space was slated for domestic release by Trans World's frequent distribution partner Vision P.D.G. at an unannounced date. The film was eventually released by Trans World on VHS and Betamax on April 14, 1988. Deep Space was re-released on Blu-ray by American publisher Scorpion Releasing on October 19, 2019. The disc was struck from a new master made by rightholders MGM, and includes a feature-length audio commentary from director Fred Olen Ray.

== Reception ==
Deep Space has received mixed reviews from critics, albeit more favorable than most of director Fred Olen Ray's output. VideoHound's Sci-Fi Experience was not impressed, calling the picture an "Alien rip-off" with an "exceptionally stupid cop hero", pointing that "[s]ome humorous moments try to keep one from thinking too hard about how much the monster resembles H.R. Giger's bigger-budget creation." James O'Neill, author of the book Sci-Fi on Tape, deemed the film to be little more than a remake of Ray's earlier Biohazard with a higher budget, writing that the creature was "described as a giant roach but actually looks like an H. R. Giger reject." He deemed the film "[n]othing special but the veteran cast has fun and it's nice to see character actor Napier get a lead for a change."

The BBC's RadioTimes Guide to Science Fiction was moderately favorable, giving the film three star and writing that "[p]rolific hack director Fred Olen Ray assembles another cast of trash icons for his most expensive offering to date ($1.5 million) and, for once, manages to craft a halfway decent Alien rip-off." John Stanley, author of The Creature Features Movie Guide, deemed that "[l]ow-budget director Fred Olen Ray rises above his previous programmers, for this sci-fi/horror meringue is well handled and the screenplay [...] has good characters and dialogue." He also praised the inclusion of recognizable character actors such as Anthony Eisley, Peter Palmer, James Booth and Julie Newmar. In a retrospective review, Brian Ordorf of Blu-ray.com found the film serviceable, writing that "Napier is fun to watch, along with the rest of the cast, but creepiness is certainly not there for Ray, who seems happy just to piece together a coherent picture with multiple creature encounters."
