= Bulletproof (1988 film) =

1988 American action film directed by Steve Carver

- Directed by: Steve Carver
- Written by: T.L. Lankford (story and screenplay); Fred Olen Ray (story); B.J. Goldman (screenplay)
- Produced by: Lisa M. Hansen (executive producer); Paul Hertzberg (producer)
- Starring: Gary Busey; Darlanne Fluegel; Henry Silva; Thalmus Rasulala; L. Q. Jones; René Enríquez
- Cinematography: Francis Grumman
- Edited by: Jeff Freeman
- Music by: Thomas Chase; Steve Rucker
- Distributed by: CineTel Films
- Release date: May 13, 1988 (U.S.)
- Running time: 94 mins.
- Country: United States
- Language: English
- Budget: $5,000,000 (estimated)
- Box office: $807,947 (USA)

Bulletproof is a 1988 American action film directed by Steve Carver and starring Gary Busey, Darlanne Fluegel, Henry Silva, Thalmus Rasulala, L. Q. Jones. Busey plays a reckless cop who travels to Mexico to retrieve a tank prototype hijacked by a terror group representing an alliance of anti-American powers.

== Plot ==
Frank McBain is a Los Angeles cop and former CIA operative, who left the agency after a botched mission where his partner Jack Benson lost his life. His failure garnered him the animosity of U.S. Army lieutenant Devon Shepard, who was caught in a love triangle with the two men, and the disdain of his peers, who suspected that he may have caused his colleague's death to keep Shepard to himself. McBain has earned the nickname "Bulletproof" due to his uncanny ability to survive bullet wounds, and keeps all thirty-nine projectiles that have failed to kill him as mementos in a mason jar.

Meanwhile, U.S. intelligence has learned of the existence of a secret camp located just 300 miles south of the Mexican border, which trains various Latin American communists and Arabic insurgents, all united under the banner of the anti-American People's Liberation Army. Looking for a diplomatic justification to wipe out the camp, top army generals decide to convoy a new and virtually bulletproof tank prototype, the MBT-90 (codename "Thunderblast"), past the Mexican border and into PLA territory to entice its hijack by the militants. Oblivious to the mission's real objective, Shepard is selected to be a part of the tank's escort. A patrol of revolutionaries headed by young Captain Pantaro duly stops the convoy, but they prove more radicalized than expected: most U.S. military personnel are swiftly killed while a few survivors, including Shepard and her friend Sergeant O'Rourke, get kidnapped and taken to the PLA camp along with the MBT-90.

There, Shepard gets acquainted with two men in charge, PLA general Maximiliano Brogado and his cruel Libyan advisor Colonel Kartiff, who shows a strong distaste for the emancipation afforded to American women like her. Following that debacle, McBain is called back to the CIA and tasked with retrieving the prototype in a secret, lone-wolf operation. Upon learning that his old partner's bereaved girlfriend is among the captives, he feels compelled to redeem himself towards her, and accepts. Meanwhile, Kartiff and Brogado discover that the tank is inoperational, as it has been outfitted with an electroshock device that prevents its use by unauthorized personnel. They threaten to kill more of Shepard's squadmates if she does not disable the security.

== Cast ==
- Gary Busey as Frank "Bulletproof" McBain
- Darlanne Fluegel as Devon Shepard
- Henry Silva as Colonel Kartiff
- Thalmus Rasulala as Billy Dunbar
- L. Q. Jones as Sergeant O'Rourke
- René Enríquez as Brogado
- Mills Watson as Colby
- James Andronica as Tarpley
- R.G. Armstrong as Miles Blackburn
- William Smith as Russian Major
- Luke Askew as Gallo
- Lincoln Kilpatrick as Briggs
- Lydie Denier as Tracy
- Ramón Franco as Camilo
- Juan Fernández as Pantaro
- Jorge Cervera Jr. as Hermano
- Lucy Lee Flippin as Sister Mary
- Redmond Gleeson as Father Riley
- Ken Medlock as Jack Benson
- Don Pike as Montoya
- Danny Trejo as Sharkey
- Gray Frederickson as Border Guard
- Christopher Doyle as Duvall
- Cary-Hiroyuki Tagawa as Thug In Flashback

== Production ==
=== Development ===
Fred Olen Ray wrote the film's story under the working title Thunderblast, and was originally going to direct as part of two-picture deal with CineTel, following Cyclone. The bullet-riddled hero was lifted by Ray and frequent collaborator T.L. Lankford from one of their earlier scripts, which eventually found its own way to the screen as Deep Space. According to Ray's biography, the character moment where Busey pulls a bullet from his shoulder was expanded with material excised from the equivalent scene in Deep Space, which was abridged at the request of producer Moshe Diamant due to his distaste for graphic gunshot wounds.

Bulletproof was intended as a step up in class for the fledgling CineTel, and the casting director told them that Ray—who had a reputation for campy films—lacked the pedigree needed to attract the reputable star they were looking for to headline. In response, president Paul Hertzberg removed Ray from the project and assigned directorial duties to Steve Carver, who boasted more mainstream credentials. This paved the way for Gary Busey's signing, while Ray moved on to the lower-budget Commando Squad for Trans World Entertainment. Although he received financial compensation for his dismissal, his relationship with Hertzberg remained strained for several years.

=== Filming ===
Busey filmed Bulletproof immediately after fulfilling his duties on Lethal Weapon, continuing the transition towards more action-oriented roles that followed his physical recovery from drug addiction. Photography was originally slated for July 1986, but was delayed to December 16, 1986. Busey mentioned wrapping up filming on the eve of an interview to The Daily Oklahoman, which was published on March 6. The military vehicles, included the tank redesigned by prop maker Gene Rizzardi to become the "Thunderblast", as well as several Mexican-style sets, were rented from the Veluzat family, Hollywood veterans who owned both a movie ranch and vehicle rental service.

While Gary Busey had vowed to clean up his act following his personal issues, Carver still found the actor difficult, which he attributed to a combination of temperament and method acting. The unusual insult "butthorn" was part of Busey's real-world vocabulary, so Carver told him to add it to the dialogue. Actor René Enriquez was given the green light to participate by the producers of his regular show Hill Street Blues, and was scheduled to start filming his part on Bulletproof on January 6, 1987. However, he was unexpectedly called back to Hill Street Blues on January 5. The actor remained committed to the feature, and the showrunners worked out their schedule to accommodate him.

Far more serious were the film's financial problems. The preliminary budget was pegged at $1.75 million. However production butted heads with the unions and ran out of money as costs skyrocketed past the $5 million mark, which resulted in several shutdowns and confrontations over unpaid wages. During one such dispute on February 12, 1986, a crew member was allegedly struck by a security guard employed by CineTel, although no charges were ultimately pressed due to lack of evidence.

== Release ==
The film was originally announced for August 1987. A later source announced it for late February 1988. The film benefited from an $1 million advertising campaign, which encompassed 300 billboards across the nation's major metropolitan centers. However, its impact was diminished when the release date, announced on the posters as April 29, 1988, was yet again delayed to May 13.

=== Theatrical ===
Bulletproof opened in domestic theaters on May 13, 1988 in a limited, 263-screen release. The film made $421,302 in its first weekend and finished with a gross of $807,947 at the domestic box office. The film ended up being CineTel's first money loser. The film's domestic bow was preceded by a limited U.K. release at select London Cannon Cinemas on December 11, 1987.

=== Home media ===
The film arrived on VHS and Betamax tapes through RCA Columbia Pictures Home Video on August 25, 1988. The U.K. VHS saw an earlier release on January 22, 1988, via Virgin Vision. It made its domestic DVD debut through budget publisher Platinum Disc on July 30, 2002.

== Reception ==
Bulletproof received largely negative reviews, with most critics pointing to its over-the-top nature. Michael Wilmington of the Los Angeles Times panned the film, writing that "only the opening scene has any life" and that "[i]t’s a genuine shame to watch Busey—one of the most vital character actors of the ‘70s, wasting himself in a cliche-ridden stinker like this". Caryn James of the New York Times wrote: "Steve Carver has directed Bulletproof as if he were putting together a jigsaw puzzle. He tries this piece, he tries that, he hammers in the pieces that don't quite fit." Robert S. Cauthorn of The Arizona Daily Star wrote that "[i]t is possible to view Bulletproof as a parody of the conventions found in the macho mania afflicting the nation's screens". However, he countered that the film "wants to woo the audience of the movies it seeks to ape. You can't have it both ways with parody."

Frazier Moore of The Atlanta Constitution compared it to the then-latest installment of the Rambo franchise and wrote: "Gary's film is not better or worse than Sly's, only terrible, but quality may not matter to you. What should is knowing which film you're watching, and now you do: Bulletproof is Rambo III with a dumb grin and sensible shoes". In his review syndicated through the McClatchy News Service, Joe Baltake of the Sacramento Bee praised the film, noting that Carver had "assembled a veritable treasure trove of action film/character actors" and concluding that "Bulletproof is delirious—all action, little talk and what little talk there is, is howlingly funny".

Media scholar Jack G. Shaheen critiqued the movie for its anti-Arab sentiment, writing that it reinforced the stereotypical association of Arabs with terrorism. In particular, Kartiff is portrayed as anti-Christian, sexually violent, and misogynistic (with the implication that Libyan women are all submissive).
