= The Satan Bug =

1965 film by John Sturges based on the 1962 novel

- Theatrical release poster
- Directed by: John Sturges
- Screenplay by: James Clavell; Edward Anhalt
- Based on: The Satan Bug by Ian Stuart
- Produced by: John Sturges
- Starring: George Maharis; Richard Basehart; Anne Francis; Dana Andrews
- Cinematography: Robert Surtees
- Edited by: Ferris Webster
- Music by: Jerry Goldsmith
- Production company: The Mirisch Corporation
- Distributed by: United Artists
- Release date: April 14, 1965 (United States)
- Running time: 114 minutes
- Country: United States
- Language: English
- Budget: $6 million or $1.8 million

The Satan Bug is a 1965 American crime science fiction suspense film from United Artists, produced and directed by John Sturges, that stars George Maharis, Richard Basehart, Anne Francis, and Dana Andrews. The screenplay by James Clavell and Edward Anhalt was loosely based on the 1962 novel of the same name by Alistair MacLean, written under the pseudonym Ian Stuart. The film score was composed by Jerry Goldsmith. The film featured the first use of a stabilized camera mount, invented by Nelson Tyler, placed on a helicopter.

== Plot ==
Lee Barrett, a former intelligence agent, is approached by a man offering him a job to join a political organization against bioweapons. However, the man turns out to be an impersonator sent by Barrett's former boss, Eric Cavanaugh, to test his loyalty. Cavanaugh asks Barrett to investigate the murder of the security chief and the disappearance of Dr. Baxter, the head scientist at Station Three, a secretive bioweapons laboratory.

Barrett and Cavanaugh arrive at the laboratory and are advised by Dr. Hoffman to seal the laboratory using concrete. Hoffman reveals that there are two deadly bioweapons inside: a strain of botulinus that oxidizes after eight hours and a newly developed virus called the "Satan Bug" that could wipe out all life on Earth. Barrett enters the sealed laboratory and finds Dr. Baxter dead, with the vials containing the "Satan Bug" and botulinus missing.

Barrett receives a mysterious telegram from his former flame, Ann, who is also assigned to work with him on the investigation. They discover the dead body of another scientist from the laboratory and trace the suspect to Charles Reynolds Ainsley, a reclusive millionaire, and pharmaceutical tycoon. Ainsley threatens to release the viruses unless Station Three is destroyed.

After a demonstration of the botulinus in Florida, Ainsley threatens to release more in Los Angeles County unless the laboratory is closed. Barrett and Ann follow a lead to an abandoned car and find the missing vials. They are confronted by armed men who take them to Dr. Hoffman's home. Unbeknownst to the henchmen, they are being followed.

At the home, the henchmen realize they are being followed by security agents. In a confrontation at an abandoned gas station, Barrett convinces the henchmen to keep Ann hostage while he escapes the garage, which is set on fire. Barrett stops a passing car driven by Hoffman, who is revealed to be Ainsley. They strike a deal to locate the vials in Los Angeles. As they are intercepted by security agents, Ainsley is arrested. Barrett realizes the agents are actually Ainsley's security guards, defeats them and confronts Ainsley again. A helicopter arrives to pick up Ainsley and Barrett goes with him.

Meanwhile, the authorities discover the other botulinus flask hidden in the ice of a concession stand at Dodger Stadium and disarm the boobytrap attached to it.

During a struggle, Barrett throws the pilot out of the helicopter and grabs the Satan Bug flask. Ainsley jumps out of the helicopter to his death and Barrett safely takes control of the helicopter. Barrett prepares to land at Los Angeles International Airport and tells General Williams by radio that he will give him the Satan Bug flask, "and we're right back where we started".

== Cast ==
- George Maharis as Lee Barrett
- Richard Basehart as Dr. Gregor Hoffman / Charles Reynolds Ainsley
- Anne Francis as Ann Williams
- Dana Andrews as General Williams
- John Larkin as Leonard Michaelson
- Richard Bull as Eric Cavanaugh
- Frank Sutton as Donald
- Ed Asner as Veretti
- Simon Oakland as Tasserly
- John Anderson as Reagan
- John Clarke as Raskin
- Hari Rhodes as Johnson
- Martin Blaine as Martin
- Henry Beckman as Baxter
- Harry Lauter as Fake SDI agent
- James Hong as Yang

Uncredited (in order of appearance)
John Hubbard	uniformed guard at Station Three, standing next to Raskin as they observe the landing of Agent Reagan's helicopter (Hubbard's character remains silent)
James W. Gavin	helicopter pilot who transported Agent Reagan to the compound and replies, "Yes, sir."
Harold Gould	Dr. Ostrer, scientist at the base who says, upon walking past, "Oh, Reagan, I've gotta talk to you."
Russ Bender	Mason, guard sitting at entrance to the compound, who replies to Reagan's question, "Six, sir. Eh… Doctor Baxter, Doctor Hoffman, Doctor Yang and three technicians."
Lee Remick	cocktail waitress, at bar featuring bongo drums and piano music, who whispers in Barrett's ear and then he whispers in her ear (Remick co-starred in Sturges' The Hallelujah Trail, released two months after The Satan Bug)
Noam Pitlik	clerk at Desert Air Motel who replies, "Oh yes, Mr. Barrett. You're in suite fifteen."
Michael Barrier	helicopter pilot, tracking the car carrying Barrett, Hoffman, Ann, Donald and Veretti, who says, "Getting a little difficult to keep 'em in sight. This is pretty rough country and it's closing in on the road."
William Bryant	SDI agent, one of Cavanaugh's men, driving the car that follows the vehicle carrying Barrett, Ann, Donald and Veretti, who says, "They've turned left on the Seco Road now. They—uh—slowed down and—well, for a moment we got awfully close to them."
James Doohan	SDI agent, one of Cavanaugh's men, in the passenger seat of the car that follows the vehicle carrying Barrett, Ann, Donald and Veretti. Doohan shares his scenes with William Bryant, but only Bryant has dialogue.
Carey Loftin	SDI agent who arrives at site of the jackknifed truck and starts a conversation with Donald, "Won't be long, he said. Did you ever hear a cop say anything else? It'll be hours."
Paul Sorensen	SDI agent who stops at site of the jackknifed truck and starts a conversation with Veretti, "Look at all those cans and busted beer bottles. You'd think people wouldn't throw things out there like that."
Tol Avery	police captain in charge of searching Dodger Stadium who says, "Hello! Yes, we're here looking. Nothing. Yes, we'll look in there. Of course, we'll look in there. Yeah, yeah, I know ..."
Lawrence Montaigne	uniformed specialist in military radar, tracking the path of the helicopter carrying Hoffman, who says, "Now here's the helicopter, sir. We've kept everything away from it, but we think it's the one."

== Release ==
=== Critical response ===
Bosley Crowther of The New York Times wrote, "The cast is a sturdy, competent one, able to move when allowed to, and do lively tricks with fists and guns." The Variety staff wrote, "The Satan Bug [has] certain unexplained, confusing elements which tend to make plot at times difficult to follow."

== See also ==
- List of American films of 1965
