= René Enríquez =

American actor (1933–1990)

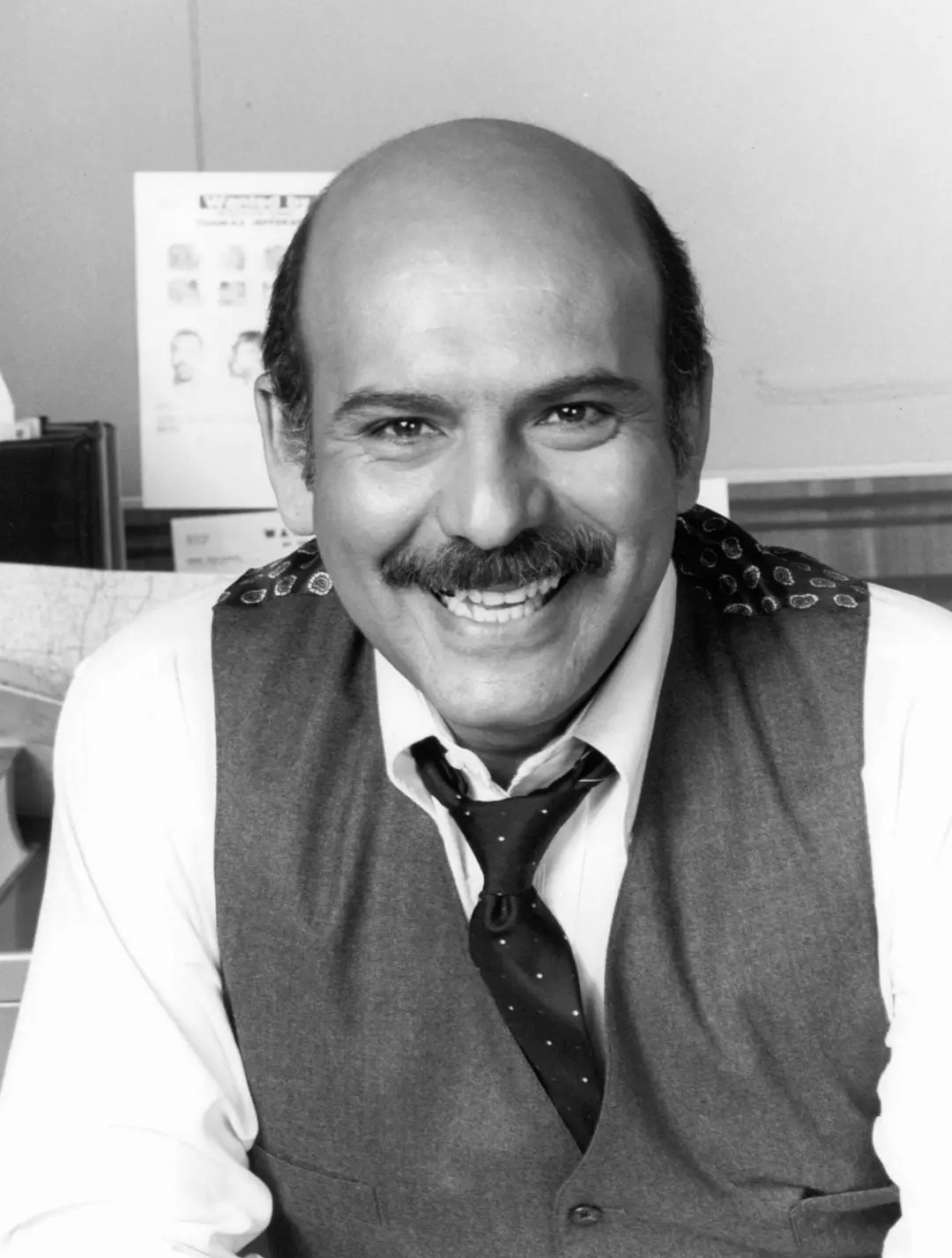
- Enríquez in Hill Street Blues, 1980
- Born: November 24, 1933; Granada, Nicaragua
- Died: March 23, 1990 (aged 56); Tarzana, California, U.S.
- Occupation: Actor
- Years active: 1960–1989
- Notable work: Hill Street Blues

René Enríquez (November 24, 1933 – March 23, 1990) was a Nicaraguan-born American television actor of the 1970s and 1980s. He is best remembered for his role as Lt. Ray Calletano in the long-running television series Hill Street Blues (1981–1987).

== Career ==
René Enríquez is best known for his role as Lt. Calletano on the Hill Street series. A role that he was proud to portray as a Hispanic actor. Life leading up to this role began when he returned to the United States at age 16. He attended City College of San Francisco, graduated from Cal State San Francisco, and served in the Air Force during the Korean War. He studied at the Academy of Dramatic Arts in New York. Before his role on Hill Street, he had roles on The Defenders, The Nurses, Naked City, Charlie's Angels, Benson, Quincy, and WKRP in Cincinnati.

Co-star Daniel J. Travanti reminisced that, during his time on Hill Street Blues, Enríquez was "sad, unhappy because they were not thrilled with him, they kept saying that it was difficult to understand him. He was really crushed when they let him go. ... He was sweet, sweet natured and grateful for what he had there but saddened by being let go." (Note: Enríquez appeared in all seven seasons of Hill Street Blues, in 109 of the series' 144 total episodes (76%). Early in the sixth season of the show, his character became captain of the Polk Avenue Precinct, and he appeared sparingly thereafter. See also List of Hill Street Blues episodes.)

Enríquez died on March 23, 1990, from AIDS, the first of two Hill Street Blues stars to die that year, as Kiel Martin succumbed to lung cancer on December 28. Original reports said Enríquez died of pancreatic cancer. However, upon publication of his death certificate, his cause of death was revealed to be complications resulting from AIDS. As reported on a 1992 episode of Entertainment Tonight, this was not a surprise to his Hill Street Blues costar Charles Haid, as Enríquez had disclosed to Haid the true nature of his affliction.

== Partial filmography ==
- Girl of the Night (1960) – Ricardo
- Bananas (1971) – Diaz
- Serpico (1973) – Cervantes Teacher (uncredited)
- Harry and Tonto (1974) – Grocery Clerk
- Night Moves (1975) – (voice, uncredited)
- Blood Bath (1976)
- The Great American Traffic Jam (1980, television film) - Mayor Julio Escontrerez
- Under Fire (1983) – President Anastasio Somoza
- Choices of the Heart (1983, television film) - Archbishop Oscar Romero
- The Evil That Men Do (1984) – Max
- Dream West (TV Mini-series 1986) – General Castro
- Hill Street Blues (1981–1987, TV series) – Lt. Ray Calletano / Captain Ray Calletano
- Bulletproof (1988) – Gen. Maximiliano Brogado
