= 99 and 44/100% Dead =

1974 film

99 and 44/100% Dead!
- Theatrical release poster
- Directed by: John Frankenheimer
- Written by: Robert Dillon
- Produced by: Mickey Borofsky; Joe Wizan
- Starring: Richard Harris; Edmond O'Brien; Bradford Dillman
- Cinematography: Ralph Woolsey
- Edited by: Harold F. Kress
- Music by: Henry Mancini
- Distributed by: 20th Century Fox
- Release date: August 29, 1974
- Running time: 98 minutes
- Country: United States
- Language: English

99 and 44/100% Dead!, released in the UK as Call Harry Crown, is a 1974 American action comedy film directed by John Frankenheimer and starring Richard Harris. The title is a play on an advertising slogan for Ivory soap.

In the film, a professional contract killer is hired to take part in a conflict between two rival crime bosses. The mission gets personal when the killer's love interest is kidnapped by the rival gang.

== Plot ==
Harry Crown, a stylish professional hit man with a pair of Browning Hi-Power 9mm pistols with ivory grips, carried in a shoulder holster, is brought in by mob boss "Uncle Frank" Kelly when his operation is challenged by Big Eddie, a grinning, lisping rival.

Crown is caught in the crossfire, as is his romantic interest, Buffy, a third-grade schoolteacher. In his attempt to take over the rackets, Big Eddie has hired Marvin "The Claw" Zuckerman, a sadistic one-armed killer with a prosthetic attachment that includes machine guns and knives.

Buffy is abducted, causing Harry to ignore Uncle Frank's warnings not to take on Eddie's men in broad daylight. A showdown in a warehouse results in The Claw being overpowered and literally disarmed. Harry appears to be too late to save Buffy, but a gunshot rings out and Big Eddie falls to the ground, slain by Uncle Frank.

== Cast ==
- Richard Harris as Harry Crown
- Edmond O'Brien as Uncle Frank Kelly
- Bradford Dillman as Big Eddie
- Chuck Connors as Marvin 'Claw' Zuckerman
- Ann Turkel as Buffy
- Constance Ford as Dolly
- David Hall as Tony
- Kathrine Baumann as Baby
- Janis Heiden as Clara
- Max Kleven as North
- Karl Lukas as Guard
- Tony Brubaker as Burt (as Anthony Brubaker)
- Jerry Summers as Shoes
- Roy Jenson as Jake

== Release ==
In 1969 the film was reported to be directed by Sergio Leone and starring Marcello Mastroianni and Charles Bronson.

Principal photography began on August 10, 1973, in Seattle before moving to Los Angeles.

Frankenheimer later described the film as "a bit off center":

It's like 1970s pop art, the idea being, quickly, that our society is so violent that the person best qualified to cope with it is the professional killer. I hope what happens won't be what happened with The Manchurian Candidate — horrible reviews and then five years later it's on everyone's list. I don't want that to happen again.

In an interview two decades later, Frankenheimer himself thought the film a failure. He felt that he did not do his best work on it and in hindsight he felt he should not have done this sort of satire.

== Home media ==
On December 13, 2011 Shout! Factory released the film on DVD as part of a double feature with The Nickel Ride.

== See also ==
- List of American films of 1974
- Richard Harris filmography
