= White Noise (soundtrack) =

Film score by Danny Elfman
- Released: November 18, 2022
- Recorded: 2022
- Genres: Electronic; synth; classical
- Length: 45:27
- Label: Netflix Music
- Producer: Danny Elfman

Danny Elfman chronology
Doctor Strange in the Multiverse of Madness (2022)	White Noise (2022)	Beetlejuice Beetlejuice (2024)

White Noise (Soundtrack from the Netflix Film) is the soundtrack album to the 2022 film directed by Noah Baumbach. The film's original score, which was composed by Danny Elfman, was released into a 20-track album on November 18, 2022 by Netflix Music. It also accompanies an original song, "The Cloud is Coming", performed by Dean Wareham and Britta Phillips. A single, "New Body Rhumba", was also recorded for the film's soundtrack and released on September 30, but was not included in the album.

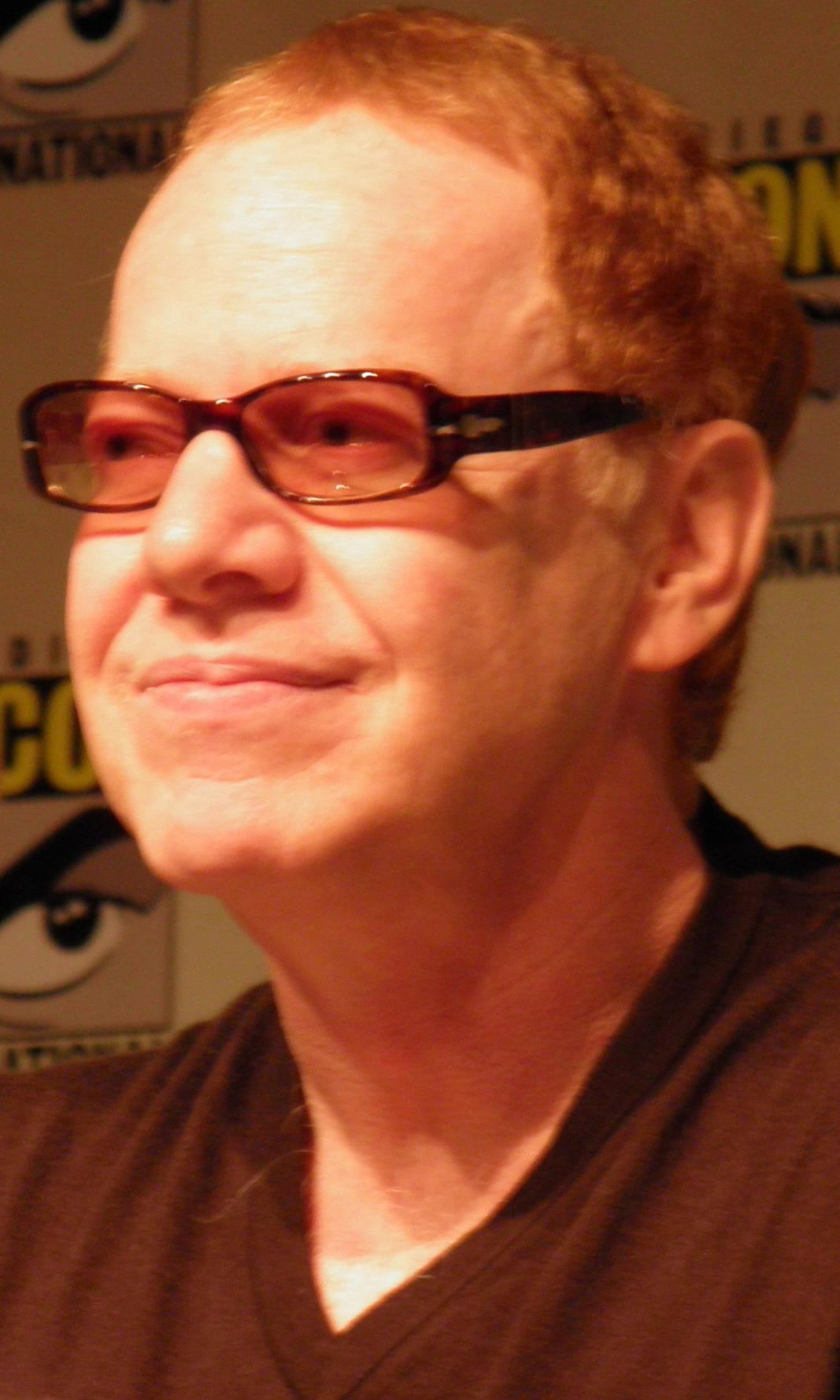
Danny Elfman composed the film's score.

== Development ==
In August 2022, Danny Elfman was revealed to be composing the original score for the film, in his first collaboration with Noah Baumbach. Since the film was not from a particular genre, he added that the film was "completely obvious to me that it was one of those projects that come along every now and then where there's no genre to indicate what type of music it should be". Baumbach said "Because it has an elevated tone, the music only helps that, and I think Danny's music situates the audience in important ways throughout the movie, because it is maybe surprising how it shifts in tones".

Baumbach instructed Elfman to create a soundscape similar to the combination of Aaron Copland and Giorgio Moroder's 1980s-based synthesizer, and Tangerine Dream's electronic music. Elfman composed the music based on these inspirations before seeing the final cut, and when the film was ready, he had nearly 20 minutes of his original ideas on the soundtrack. He produced a three-way score, with noir-influenced sounds from that time period, a cinematic and classical-based score and a simple and minimalist score for some characters, and felt that tying all the sounds were challenging. The score for White Noise, was created mostly using synthesisers, hence Elfman had to program the sounds that would come up "really fun and cool". Other instruments such as piano, strings and clarinet were used.

The theme "Duel Lecture" was released as a single from the album on November 17, 2022. On writing the song, Elfman had said "I just loved writing that because it was classical but not classical, playing to the kind of Bulgarian sense of the way Adam Driver is playing the speech. He gets so drawn up in it and is so theatrical that I just kind of went with him [...] It was just really fun following Adam Driver starting this relatively simple speech, and soon he's giving wild gestures, and then at the same time we're seeing a huge train crash. That was a delightful moment for me."

== Single ==
"New Body Rhumba" is the single track performed by American rock band LCD Soundsystem, that was released on September 30, 2022 through DFA and Columbia Records. The band's frontman James Murphy and Baumbach had been fan of the original novel, on which the film is based. The friendship between Murphy and Baumbach, and their previous collaboration, led Murphy to write a song for the film's soundtrack. However, the single was not included in the soundtrack album, which released on November 18, 2022. The song was mentioned as the possible contender for Best Original Song category at the 95th Academy Awards and at the 80th Golden Globe Awards.

== Track listing ==
No.	Title	Length
1.	"Waves and Radiation"	1:22
2.	"Me First"	2:05
3.	"Duel Lecture"	4:59
4.	"Airborne Toxic Event"	0:31
5.	"Toxic Chemicals"	1:00
6.	"Chew Gum or Smoke"	1:32
7.	"We're Late"	1:03
8.	"Highway Disaster"	1:06
9.	"Up There"	2:09
10.	"Teddy Bear"	1:51
11.	"Panic"	1:07
12.	"Terribly Sad Moment"	4:39
13.	"Trash"	3:34
14.	"Bad Dream"	2:16
15.	"Lost in the Kitchen"	1:14
16.	"Finding Mink"	3:02
17.	"You Shot You"	1:45
18.	"Sunrise"	2:43
19.	"Wrap Up"	0:55
20.	"Nebulous Mass"	2:32
21.	"The Cloud Is Coming" (performed by Dean Wareham and Britta Phillips)	4:02
Total length:		45:27

== Reception ==
Kristy Puchko of Mashable wrote that "music by Danny Elfman grumbles with an electric sense of dread". Ryan Leston of IGN wrote "An impeccable score by Danny Elfman only serves to heighten everything we see on screen, from the weirdness to the tension, with B-movie-style moments that seem predictably ominous." "Danny Elfman's nuanced score, which channels the modern classicism of John Adams, but adds a note of irony to the gravitas."

== Accolades ==
Award	Date of ceremony	Category	Recipient(s)	Result
Hollywood Music in Media Awards	November 16, 2022	Best Original Score in a Feature Film	Danny Elfman	Nominated
Hollywood Music in Media Awards	November 16, 2022	Best Original Song in a Feature Film	James Murphy, Nancy Whang, Patrick Mahoney ("New Body Rhumba")	Nominated
