= The Cassandra Crossing =

1976 film by George Pan Cosmatos

- Theatrical release poster
- Directed by: George Pan Cosmatos
- Screenplay by: Tom Mankiewicz; Robert Katz; George Pan Cosmatos
- Story by: Robert Katz; George Pan Cosmatos
- Produced by: Carlo Ponti; Lew Grade
- Starring: Sophia Loren; Richard Harris; Burt Lancaster; Ava Gardner; Martin Sheen; O. J. Simpson; Lee Strasberg
- Cinematography: Ennio Guarnieri
- Edited by: Roberto Silvi; Françoise Bonnot
- Music by: Jerry Goldsmith
- Production companies: ITC Entertainment; C. Cinematografica Champion s.p.a.; International Cine Productions
- Distributed by: AVCO Embassy Pictures
- Release dates: 18 December 1976 (Italy & Japan); 31 March 1977 (UK & West Germany)
- Running time: 129 minutes
- Country: United Kingdom; Italy; West Germany
- Language: English
- Budget: $3 million or $6 million
- Box office: $4.2 million $15,300,000 (Japan); SEK 152,111 (Sweden)

The Cassandra Crossing is a 1976 disaster thriller film directed by George Pan Cosmatos, from a screenplay he co-wrote with Tom Mankiewicz and Robert Katz. The film is about a viral outbreak aboard a cross-European train, as it heads to a derelict arch bridge which is liable to collapse. It stars an ensemble cast, featuring Sophia Loren, Richard Harris, Ava Gardner, Martin Sheen, Burt Lancaster, Lee Strasberg, O. J. Simpson, Ingrid Thulin, Lionel Stander, Ann Turkel, John Phillip Law, and Alida Valli.

With the backing of the media tycoon Sir Lew Grade (the head of the British broadcast network Associated Television) and the Italian film producer Carlo Ponti, the international all-star cast was expected to attract a widespread audience, with rights sold prior to filming, to both British and American distributors. Ponti also saw the production as a showcase for his wife, Sophia Loren. Shooting took place on-location in France and Switzerland, and at Cinecittà Studios.

The film was first released in Italy on December 18, 1976. It had a generally unfavourable critical response, though it was financially successful.

== Plot ==
When the existence of a strain of plague (vaguely identified as pneumonic) is revealed at the US mission at the International Health Organization in Geneva, three terrorists seek to blow up the US mission. Two of them are shot, one mortally, by security personnel, but one escapes. The surviving terrorist is hospitalized and quarantined and identified as Swedish. Elena Stradner and US military intelligence Colonel Stephen Mackenzie argue over the nature of the strain, which Stradner suspects is a biological weapon but which Colonel Mackenzie claims was in the process of being destroyed.

The third terrorist, Eklund, escapes and stows away on a train travelling from Geneva to Stockholm. Stradner believes that the train should be stopped so that the terrorist can be removed and quarantined, but Col. Mackenzie is concerned that all of the passengers on the train might be infected. Mackenzie insists on rerouting the train to a disused railway line which goes to a former Nazi concentration camp in Janov, Poland, where the passengers will be quarantined. However, the line crosses a dangerously unsound steel arch bridge known as the Kasundruv Bridge or the "Cassandra Crossing", out of use since 1948.

Mackenzie understands that the bridge might collapse as the train passes over it. The presence of the infected terrorist, and the rerouting of the train, precipitates the second conflict, among passengers on the train who include Jonathan Chamberlain, a famous neurologist; his ex-wife Jennifer Rispoli Chamberlain, a writer; a former inmate of Janov and Holocaust survivor Herman Kaplan; and Nicole Dressler, the wife of a German arms dealer. She is embroiled in an affair with her young companion Robby Navarro. Navarro is a heroin trafficker being pursued by Interpol agent Haley, who is travelling undercover as a priest.

Mackenzie informs Chamberlain of the presence of Eklund, who is found hiding in the baggage car next to a caged Basset Hound, but attempts to remove him via helicopter are unsuccessful. Just before the train enters a tunnel, the dog infected with Eklund's plague is transferred to the helicopter and taken back to the IHO lab. Chamberlain is also told that the plague has a 60% mortality rate. Mackenzie, however, informs passengers that police have received reports of anarchist bombs placed along the rail line, and that the train will be rerouted to Nuremberg. There the train is sealed with an enclosed oxygen system and a US Army medical team is placed aboard, with the now-deceased terrorist being placed in a hermetically sealed coffin. Armed guards with shoot-to-kill orders from Mackenzie also board the train, who wound Kaplan when he tries to escape. Chamberlain learns of the risk of the Cassandra Crossing.

Chamberlain also begins to suspect the disease is not as serious as originally thought: few of the passengers have become infected and even fewer have actually died. He radios Mackenzie suggesting the infected portion of the train be uncoupled and isolated, but Mackenzie, acting under orders, has no intention of stopping the train: if, as expected, the Cassandra Crossing collapses, it will neatly cover the fact that the American military has been harbouring germ warfare agents in a neutral country. Chamberlain and Haley form a group of passengers to overcome the guards and seize control of the train before it reaches the doomed bridge. At the lab, Dr. Stradner tests and monitors the ill dog, which spontaneously recovers, but Mackenzie is unimpressed and refuses to alter his plan.

Navarro is killed by the guards as he attempts to reach the engine from the outside. Haley is killed during a firefight while protecting a girl passenger. Kaplan learns of the plot to blow up the club car's bottled gas supply and expose the coupler. He sacrifices himself by setting off the explosion with a cigarette lighter. Chamberlain manages to separate the rear half of the train, hoping that with less weight the front half will cross safely. But the bridge collapses, killing everyone aboard the front half. Max, the train's conductor, applies the manual brakes and stops the remaining cars just before reaching the downed bridge. The survivors soon evacuate the remaining cars and head off on foot, no longer under guard or quarantine. In Geneva, both Stradner and Mackenzie depart: she keeps hope of survivors while he feels quiet guilt over the whole affair. After they leave, Major Stack informs Mackenzie's superior that both the colonel and the doctor are under surveillance.

== Cast ==
Sources:

- Sophia Loren as Jennifer Rispoli Chamberlain
- Richard Harris as Jonathan Chamberlain
- Burt Lancaster as Col. Stephen MacKenzie
- Martin Sheen as Robby Navarro
- Lee Strasberg as Herman Kaplan
- Ava Gardner as Nicole Dressler
- Ingrid Thulin as Elena Stradner
- O. J. Simpson as Haley
- Lionel Stander as Max the Conductor
- Ann Turkel as Susan
- John Phillip Law as Major Stack
- Alida Valli as Nanny
- Lou Castel as Eklund
- Ray Lovelock as Tom
- John P. Dulaney as Bobby
- Thomas Hunter as Captain Scott
- Stefano Patrizi as Lars
- Fausta Avelli as Caterina
- Carlo De Mejo as Alvin
- Renzo Palmer as Alberti

== Production ==
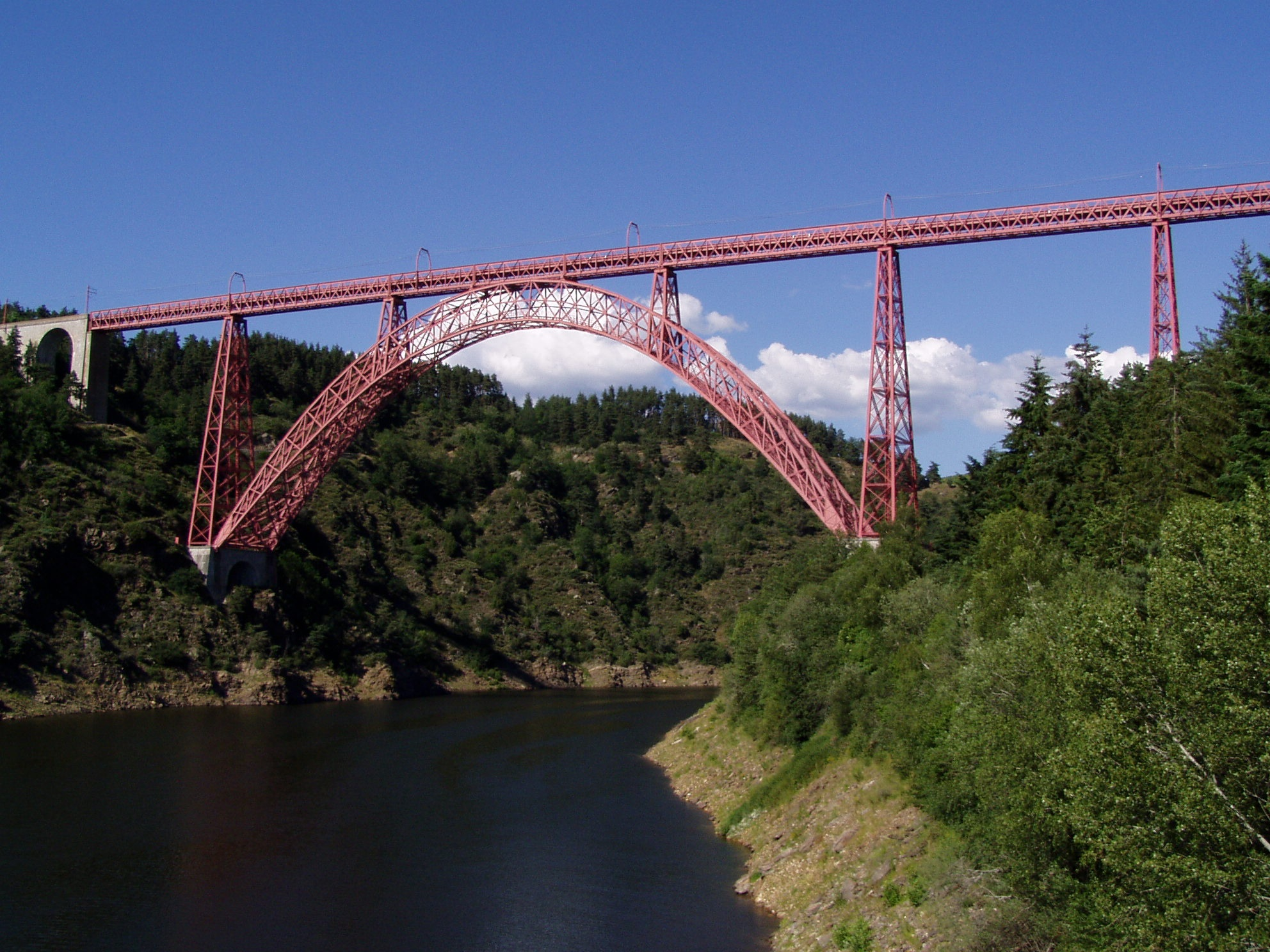
The Garabit Viaduct arch bridge was used to represent the condemned "Cassandra Crossing".

The Cinecittà studios in Rome were chosen for interiors, with French and Swiss locales providing most of the location footage. The steel arch bridge depicted in the film is actually the Garabit Viaduct in southern France, built from 1880 to 1884 by Gustave Eiffel, who later constructed the Eiffel Tower.

At the beginning of the film passengers arrive at Geneva railway station to embark on the train. The scenes were shot at Basel SBB railway station. Where Dr Chamberlain enters the station, the green coloured BVB trams and Basel's Central Station Square can be seen in the background.

Much of the film's special effects involved models and rear screen work that was largely effective, although the studio artwork shows a typical US diesel locomotive that doesn't resemble anything seen in the film.

Peter O'Toole was offered the lead, but turned it down. Richard Harris took the role. His wife, Ann Turkel, was cast as Susan.

The Cassandra Crossing was the third film made by George Pan Cosmatos. Ava Gardner said "the real reason I'm in this picture is money, baby, pure and simple." Tom Mankiewicz, who worked on the script, dubbed the film The Towering Germ, referencing a contemporaneous all-star disaster film, The Towering Inferno.

== Reception ==
The film holds a score of 42% on Rotten Tomatoes based on 12 reviews.

Richard Eder of The New York Times called the film "profoundly, offensively stupid," with Ava Gardner "awful in an awful role" and Sophia Loren "totally miscast." Gene Siskel of the Chicago Tribune gave the film 1.5 stars out of 4 and called it "an unintentional parody of a disaster film. The catastrophes that befall the passengers of a Geneva to Copenhagen train in the picture are positively ridiculous." Variety dismissed the film as, "a tired, hokey and sometimes unintentionally funny disaster film in which a trainload of disease-exposed passengers lurch to their fate." Kevin Thomas of the Los Angeles Times called the film "a disaster picture quite literally disastrous and so awful it's unintentionally hilarious." Gary Arnold of The Washington Post wrote, "Cosmatos is an absentminded, huffing-puffing director who seems to keep hoping we'll overlook his frazzled continuity, which suggests an old serial slapped together in such a way that the cliffhanging bits are never resolved." Richard Combs of The Monthly Film Bulletin wrote, "The one remotely enjoyable aspect of The Cassandra Crossing is that it knows no proportion in anything—from performances through plotting, shooting style and special effects, it is constantly outdoing itself in monumental silliness."

The film was booed and hissed at preview screenings by critics.

The graphic scenes of the passengers being killed at the end of the film had ensured an "R" rating in theatres and led to two "censored" and "uncensored" versions being released for broadcast and home media.

=== Box office ===
The Cassandra Crossing, however, still made money; the producers reported that they recouped the film's production costs out of Japan alone.
