= Richard Harris =

Irish actor and singer (1930–2002)

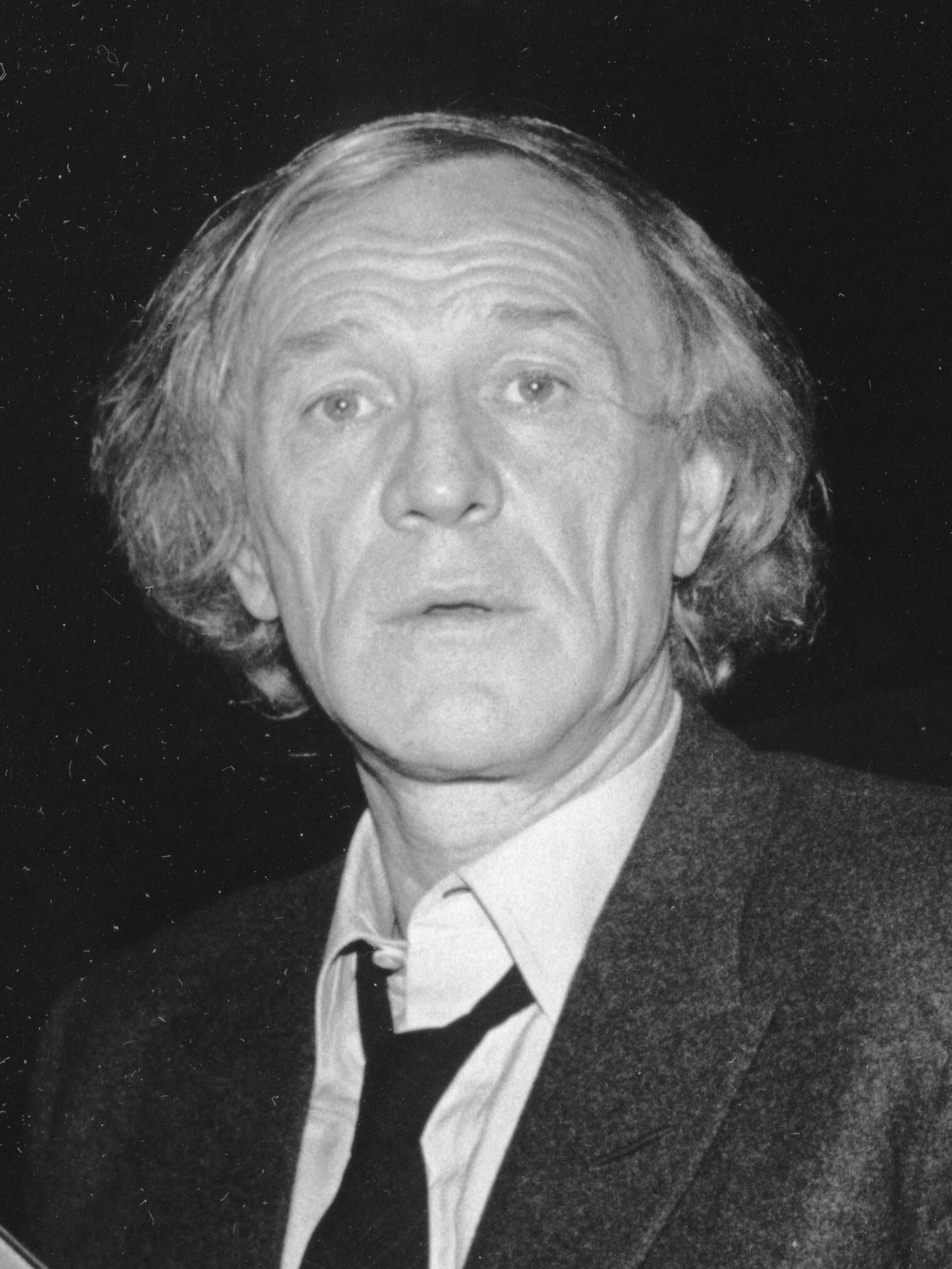
- Harris in 1985
- Born: Richard St John Francis Harris; 1 October 1930; Limerick, Ireland
- Died: 25 October 2002 (aged 72); London, England
- Education: London Academy of Music and Dramatic Art
- Occupations: Actor; singer
- Years active: 1947–2002
- Spouses: Elizabeth Rees-Williams (m. 1957; div. 1969); Ann Turkel (m. 1974; div. 1982)
- Children: Damian; Jared; Jamie

Richard St John Francis Harris (1 October 1930 – 25 October 2002) was an Irish actor and singer. Having studied at the London Academy of Music and Dramatic Art, he rose to prominence as an icon of the British New Wave. He received numerous accolades including the Cannes Film Festival Award for Best Actor, a Grammy Award, and a Golden Globe. In 2020 he was listed at number 3 on The Irish Times's list of Ireland's greatest film actors.

Harris received two Academy Award for Best Actor nominations for his performances in This Sporting Life (1963), and The Field (1990). Other notable roles include in The Guns of Navarone (1961), Red Desert (1964), A Man Called Horse (1970), Cromwell (1970), Unforgiven (1992), Gladiator (2000), and The Count of Monte Cristo (2002). He gained cross-generational acclaim for his role as Albus Dumbledore in the first two Harry Potter films: Philosopher's Stone (2001) and Chamber of Secrets (2002), the latter of which was his final film role.

He portrayed King Arthur in the 1967 film Camelot based on the Lerner and Loewe musical of the same name. For his performance, he received the Golden Globe Award for Best Actor – Motion Picture Musical or Comedy. He reprised the role in the 1981 Broadway musical revival. He received a Laurence Olivier Award for Best Actor nomination for his role in Pirandello's Henry IV (1991).

Harris received a Primetime Emmy Award for Outstanding Lead Actor in a Limited Series or Movie nomination for his role in The Snow Goose (1971). Harris had a number-one singing hit in Australia, Jamaica and Canada, and a top-ten hit in the United Kingdom, Ireland, and the United States with his 1968 recording of Jimmy Webb's song "MacArthur Park". He received a Grammy Award for Best Male Pop Vocal Performance nomination for the song.

== Early life and education ==
Harris was born on 1 October 1930 at Overdale, 8 Landsdown Villas, Ennis Road, Limerick, and was the fifth in a family of eight children (six boys and two girls) born to Ivan Harris, a flour merchant, and his wife, Mildred (née Harty). Overdale was "a tall, elegant, early 19th-century redbrick" house with nine bedrooms, in a wealthy part of Limerick, the houses "built at the turn of the 20th century for Limerick's burgeoning middle class... people who could afford properly grand drawing rooms, a bedroom each for the children and one for the pot, plus space for a few servants". He was educated by the Jesuits at Crescent College. A talented rugby union player, he appeared on several Munster Junior and Senior Cup teams for Crescent, and played for Garryowen. Harris's athletic career was cut short when he caught tuberculosis in his teens. He remained an ardent fan of the Munster Rugby and Young Munster teams until his death, attending many of their matches, and there are numerous stories of japes at rugby matches with the actors and fellow rugby fans Peter O'Toole and Richard Burton.

After recovering from tuberculosis, Harris moved to England, wanting to become a director. He could not find any suitable training courses, and enrolled to learn acting at the London Academy of Music and Dramatic Art (LAMDA). He had failed an audition at the Royal Academy of Dramatic Art and had been rejected by the Central School of Speech and Drama, because they felt he was too old at 24. While still a student, he rented the tiny "off-West End" Irving Theatre, and there directed his production of Clifford Odets's play Winter Journey (The Country Girl).

After completing his studies at the academy, he joined Joan Littlewood's Theatre Workshop. He began getting roles in West End theatre productions, starting with The Quare Fellow in 1956, a transfer from the Theatre Workshop. He spent nearly a decade in obscurity, learning his profession on stages throughout the UK.

== Career ==
=== 1959–1963: Early roles and breakthrough ===
Harris made his film debut in 1959 in the film Alive and Kicking, and played the lead role in The Ginger Man in the West End in 1959. In his second film, he had a small role as an IRA Volunteer in Shake Hands with the Devil (1959), supporting James Cagney. The film was shot in Ireland and directed by Michael Anderson who offered Harris a role in his next film, The Wreck of the Mary Deare (1959), shot in Hollywood.

Harris played another IRA Volunteer in A Terrible Beauty (1960), alongside Robert Mitchum. He had a memorable bit part in the film The Guns of Navarone (1961) as a Royal Australian Air Force pilot who reports that blowing up the "bloody guns" of the island of Navarone is impossible by an air raid. He had a larger part in The Long and the Short and the Tall (1961), playing a British soldier; Harris clashed with Laurence Harvey and Richard Todd during filming. For his role in the film Mutiny on the Bounty (1962), despite being virtually unknown to film audiences, Harris reportedly insisted on third billing, behind Trevor Howard and Marlon Brando, an actor he greatly admired. However, Harris fell out with Brando over the latter's behaviour during the film's production.

Harris's first starring role was in the film This Sporting Life (1963), as a bitter young coal miner, Frank Machin, who becomes an acclaimed rugby league football player. It was based on the novel by David Storey and directed by Lindsay Anderson. For his role, Harris won Best Actor in 1963 at the Cannes Film Festival and an Academy Award nomination. Harris followed this with a leading role in the Italian film, Michelangelo Antonioni's Il Deserto Rosso (Red Desert, 1964). This won the Golden Lion at the Venice Film Festival.

Harris received an offer to support Kirk Douglas in a British war film, The Heroes of Telemark (1965), directed by Anthony Mann, playing a Norwegian resistance leader. He then went to Hollywood to support Charlton Heston in Sam Peckinpah's Major Dundee (1965), as an Irish immigrant who became a Confederate cavalryman during the American Civil War. He played Cain in John Huston's film The Bible: In the Beginning... (1966). More successful at the box office was Hawaii (1966), in which Harris starred alongside Julie Andrews and Max von Sydow.

=== 1967–1971: Rise to prominence ===
As a change of pace, he was the romantic lead in a Doris Day spy spoof comedy, Caprice (1967), directed by Frank Tashlin. Harris next performed the role of King Arthur in the film adaptation of the musical play Camelot (1967). Critic Roger Ebert described the casting of Harris and Vanessa Redgrave as "about the best King Arthur and Queen Guenevere I can imagine". Harris revived the role on Broadway at the Winter Garden Theatre from 15 November 1981 to 2 January 1982, and broadcast on HBO a year later. Starring Meg Bussert as Guenevere, Richard Muenz as Lancelot and Thor Fields as Tom of Warwick. Harris, who had starred in the film, and Muenz also took the show on tour nationwide.

In The Molly Maguires (1970), he played James McParland, the detective who infiltrates the title organisation, headed by Sean Connery. It was a box-office flop. However A Man Called Horse (1970), with Harris in the title role, an 1825 English aristocrat who is captured by Native Americans, was a major success. He portrayed Oliver Cromwell in the film Cromwell in 1970 opposite Alec Guinness as King Charles I of England. That year British exhibitors voted him the 9th-most popular star at the UK box office.

In 1971, Harris starred in a BBC TV film adaptation The Snow Goose, from a screenplay by Paul Gallico. It won a Golden Globe for Best Movie made for TV and was nominated for both a BAFTA and an Emmy. and was shown in the United States as part of the Hallmark Hall of Fame. He made his directorial debut with Bloomfield (1971) and starred in Man in the Wilderness (1971), a revisionist Western based on the Hugh Glass story.

=== 1973–1981: Established actor ===
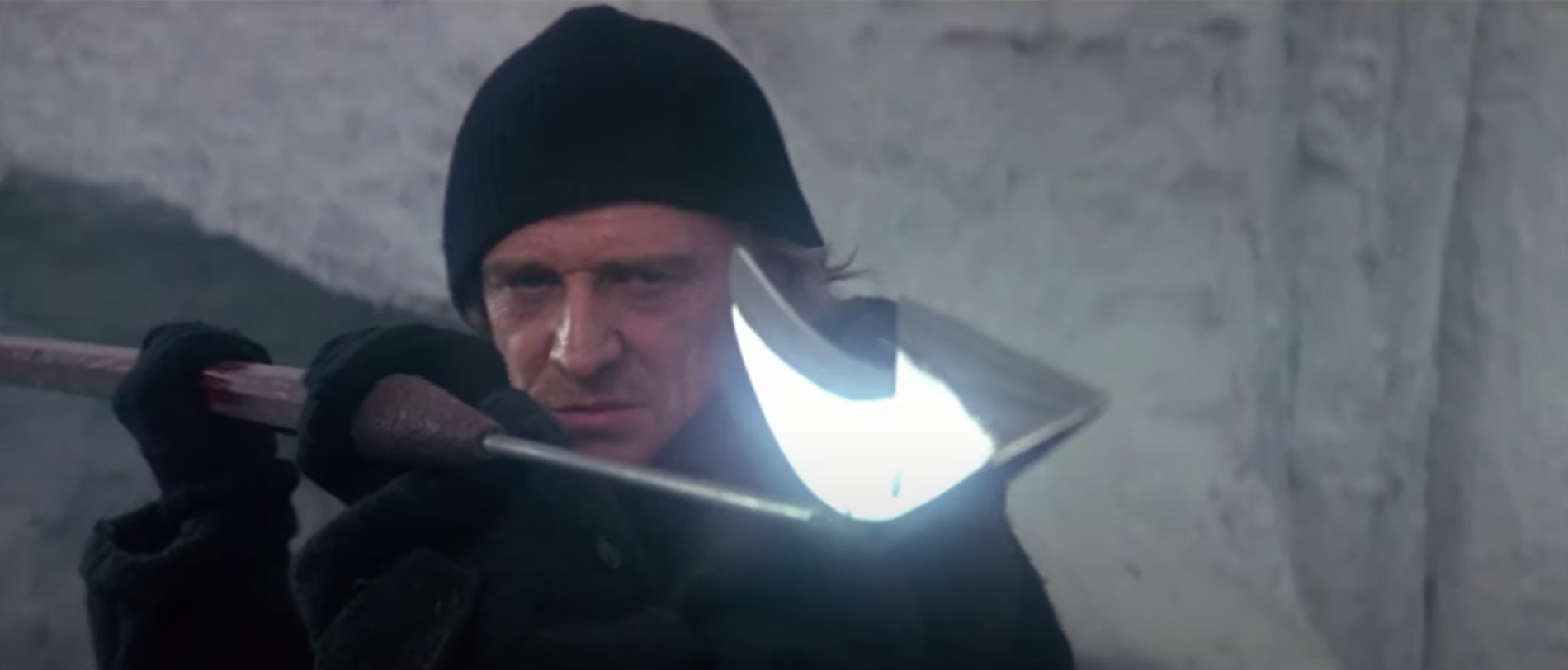
Harris in Orca

Harris starred in a Western for Samuel Fuller, Riata, which stopped production several weeks into filming. The project was re-assembled with a new director and cast, except for Harris, who returned: The Deadly Trackers (1973). In 1973 Harris published a book of poetry, I, In the Membership of My Days, which was later reissued in part in an audio LP format, augmented by self-penned songs such as "I Don't Know".

Harris starred in two thrillers: 99 and 44/100% Dead (1974), for John Frankenheimer, and Juggernaut (1974), for Richard Lester. In Echoes of a Summer (1976) he played the father of a young girl with a terminal illness. He had a cameo as Richard the Lionheart in Robin and Marian (1976), for Lester, then was in The Return of a Man Called Horse (1976). Harris led the all-star cast in the train disaster film The Cassandra Crossing (1976). He played Gulliver in the part-animated Gulliver's Travels (1977) and was reunited with Michael Anderson in Orca (1977), battling a killer whale.

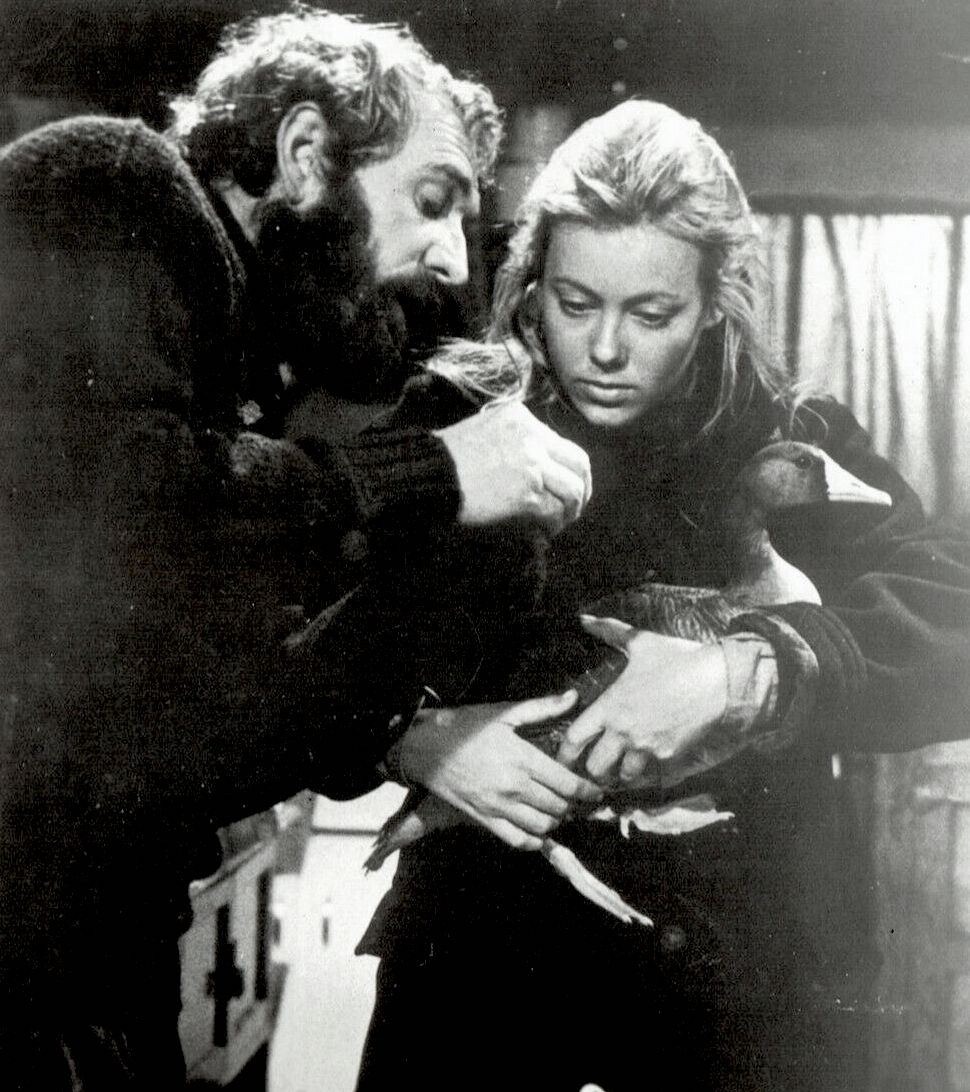
Harris and Jenny Agutter in The Snow Goose (1971)

He appeared in another action film, Golden Rendezvous (1977), based on a novel by Alistair Maclean, shot in South Africa. Harris was sued by the film's producer for his drinking; Harris counter-sued for defamation and the matter was settled out of court. Golden Rendezvous was a flop but The Wild Geese (1978), where Harris played one of several mercenaries, was a big success outside America. Ravagers (1979) was more action, set in a post-apocalyptic world. Game for Vultures (1979) was set in Rhodesia and shot in South Africa.

In Hollywood, he appeared in The Last Word (1979), then supported Bo Derek in Tarzan, the Ape Man (1981). He made a film in Canada, Your Ticket Is No Longer Valid (1981), a drama about impotence. He followed it with another Canadian film, Highpoint, a movie so bad it was not released for several years.

=== 1980–1988: Continued success ===
For a while in the 1980s, Harris went into semi-retirement on Paradise Island, in the Bahamas, where he kicked his drinking habit and embraced a healthier lifestyle. It had a beneficial effect. Harris's career was revived by his success on stage in Camelot, and powerful performance in the West End run of Luigi Pirandello's Henry IV.

He was the subject of This Is Your Life in 1990, when he was surprised by Michael Aspel during the curtain call of the Pirandello's play Henry IV at the Wyndham's Theatre in London. Over several years in the late 1980s, Harris worked with Irish author Michael Feeney Callan on his biography, which was published by Sidgwick & Jackson in 1990. His film work during this period included: Triumphs of a Man Called Horse (1983), Martin's Day (1985), Strike Commando 2 (1988), King of the Wind (1990) and Mack the Knife (1990) (a film version of The Threepenny Opera in which he played J.J. Peachum ) plus the TV film version of Maigret, opposite Barbara Shelley. This indicated declining popularity which Harris told his biographer, Michael Feeney Callan, he was "utterly reconciled to".

=== 1989–2002: Stardom and final roles ===
In June 1989 the director Jim Sheridan cast Harris in the lead role in The Field, written by the esteemed Irish playwright John B. Keane. The lead role of "Bull" McCabe was to be played by the former Abbey Theatre actor Ray McAnally. When McAnally died suddenly on 15 June 1989, Harris was offered the McCabe role. The Field was released in 1990 and earned Harris his second Academy Award nomination for Best Actor. He lost to Jeremy Irons for Reversal of Fortune. In 1992, Harris had a supporting role in the film Patriot Games. He also had roles in Unforgiven (1992), Wrestling Ernest Hemingway (1993) and Silent Tongue (1994). He played the title role in Abraham (1994) and had the lead in Cry, the Beloved Country (1995).

A lifelong supporter of Jesuit education principles, Harris established a friendship with University of Scranton President Rev. J. A. Panuska and raised funds for a scholarship for Irish students established in honour of his brother and manager, Dermot, who had died the previous year of a heart attack. He chaired acting workshops and cast the university's production of Julius Caesar in November 1987.

Harris appeared in two films which won the Academy Award for Best Picture: firstly as the gunfighter "English Bob" in the revisionist Western Unforgiven (1992); secondly as the Roman Emperor Marcus Aurelius in Ridley Scott's Gladiator (2000). He also played a lead role alongside James Earl Jones in the Darrell Roodt film adaptation of Cry, the Beloved Country (1995). In 1999, Harris starred in the film To Walk with Lions. After Gladiator, Harris played the supporting role of Albus Dumbledore in the first two of the Harry Potter films, Harry Potter and the Philosopher's Stone (2001) and Harry Potter and the Chamber of Secrets (2002), the latter of which was his final film role. Harris portrayed Abbé Faria in Kevin Reynolds' film adaptation of The Count of Monte Cristo (2002). The film Kaena: The Prophecy (2003) was dedicated to him posthumously as he had voiced the character Opaz before his death.

Harris hesitated to take the role of Dumbledore in Harry Potter and the Philosopher's Stone (2001) owing to the multi-film commitment and his declining health, but he ultimately accepted because, according to his account of the story, his 11-year-old granddaughter threatened never to speak to him again if he did not take it. In an interview with the Toronto Star in 2001, Harris expressed his concern that his association with the Harry Potter films would outshine the rest of his career. He explained, "Because, you see, I don't just want to be remembered for being in those bloody films, and I'm afraid that's what's going to happen to me."

Harris also made part of the Bible TV movie project filmed as a cinema production for the TV, a project produced by Lux Vide Italy with the collaboration of RAI and Channel 5 of France, and premiered in the United States in the channel TNT in the 1990s. He portrayed the main and title character in the production Abraham (1993) as well as Saint John of Patmos in the 2000 TV film production Apocalypse.

== Singing career ==
Harris recorded several albums of music, one of which, A Tramp Shining, included the seven-minute hit song "MacArthur Park" (Harris insisted on singing the lyric as "MacArthur's Park"). This song was written by Jimmy Webb, and it reached number 2 on the American Billboard Hot 100 chart. It also topped several music sales charts in Europe during the summer of 1968. "MacArthur Park" sold over one million copies and was awarded a gold disc. In 2024, "MacArthur Park" was featured in the wedding sequence of the Tim Burton film Beetlejuice Beetlejuice. A second album, also consisting entirely of music composed by Webb, The Yard Went on Forever, was released in 1969. In the 1973 TV special "Burt Bacharach in Shangri-La", after singing Webb's "Didn't We", Harris tells Bacharach that since he was not a trained singer he approached songs as an actor concerned with words and emotions, acting the song with the sort of honesty the song is trying to convey. Then he proceeds to sing "If I Could Go Back", from the Lost Horizon soundtrack.

== Personal life ==
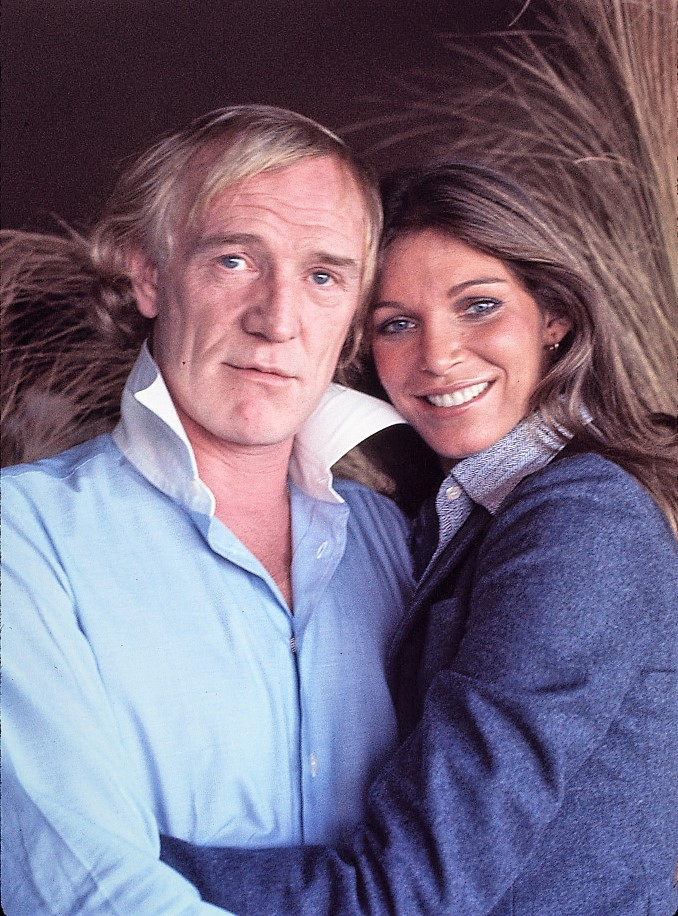
Richard Harris and Ann Turkel in 1977

In 1957 Harris married Elizabeth Rees-Williams, daughter of David Rees-Williams, 1st Baron Ogmore. They had three children: the director Damian Harris, and the actors Jared Harris and Jamie Harris. Harris and Rees-Williams divorced in 1969, after which Elizabeth married Rex Harrison. Harris's second marriage was to the American actress Ann Turkel in 1974. They divorced in 1982.

Harris was a member of the Knights of Malta.

Harris paid £75,000 for William Burges' Tower House in Holland Park, London, in 1968, after discovering that the American entertainer Liberace had arranged to buy the house but had not yet put down a deposit. Harris employed the original decorators, Campbell Smith & Company Ltd., to carry out extensive restoration work on the interior.

Harris was a vocal supporter of the Provisional Irish Republican Army (PIRA) from 1973 until 1984. In January 1984, remarks he made on the previous month's Harrods bombing caused great controversy, after which he discontinued his support for the PIRA.

At the height of his stardom in the 1960s and early 1970s, Harris was almost as well known for his hellraiser lifestyle and heavy drinking as he was for his acting career. He was a longtime alcoholic until he became a teetotaller in 1981. Nevertheless, he did resume drinking Guinness a decade later. He gave up drugs after almost dying from a cocaine overdose in 1978.

== Illness and death ==
Harris was diagnosed with Hodgkin's disease in August 2002, reportedly after being hospitalised with pneumonia. He died at University College Hospital in Bloomsbury, London, on 25 October 2002, aged 72. Harris quipped "It was the food!" as he was wheeled out of the Savoy Hotel for the last time. Harris spent his final three days in a coma. Harris's body was cremated, and his ashes were scattered in the Bahamas, where he owned a home.

Harris was a lifelong friend of the actor Peter O'Toole, and his family reportedly hoped that O'Toole would replace Harris as Dumbledore in Harry Potter and the Prisoner of Azkaban (2004). There were, however, concerns about insuring O'Toole for the six remaining films in the series. Harris was ultimately succeeded as Dumbledore by Michael Gambon. Chris Columbus, director of the first two Harry Potter films, had visited Harris during his last days and had promised not to recast Dumbledore, confident of his eventual recovery. In a 2021 interview with The Hollywood Reporter, Columbus revealed that Harris was writing an autobiography during his stay at the hospital, but it has not been published.

== Memorials and legacy ==
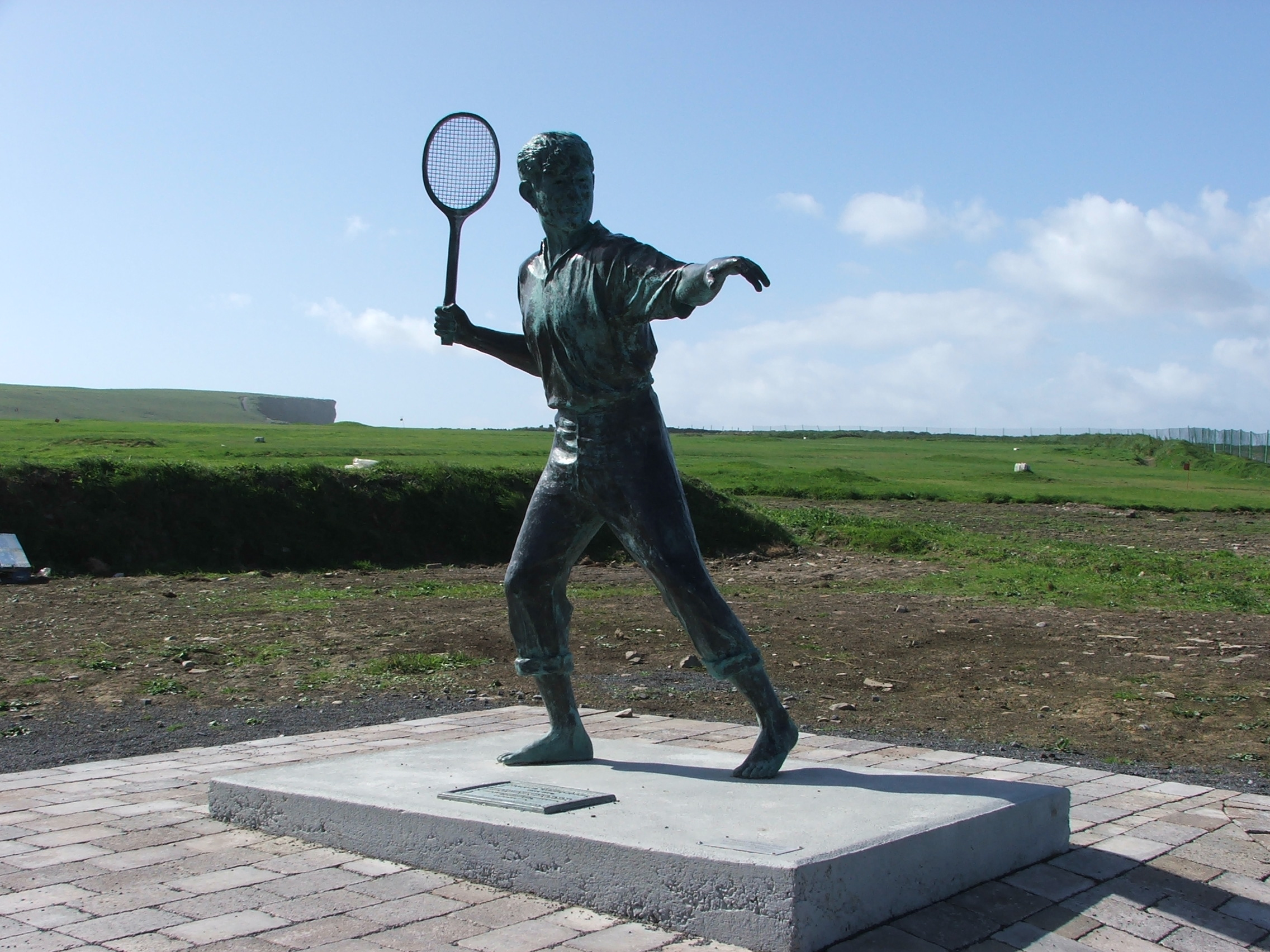
A statue in Kilkee, Ireland, of the young Harris playing racquetball

On 30 September 2006, Manuel Di Lucia, of Kilkee in County Clare, a longtime friend, organised the placement in Kilkee of a bronze life-size statue of Harris. It shows Harris at the age of eighteen playing racquetball. (He had won the local competition three or four consecutive times during the late 1940s.) The sculptor was Seamus Connolly and the work was unveiled by Russell Crowe. Harris was an accomplished squash racquets player, winning the Tivoli Cup in Kilkee four consecutive years (1948 to 1951), a record unsurpassed to this day.

A statue of Harris as King Arthur in Limerick City

Another life-size statue of Harris, as King Arthur from his film Camelot, has been erected in Bedford Row, in the centre of his home town of Limerick. The sculptor of this statue was the Irish sculptor Jim Connolly, a graduate of the Limerick School of Art and Design.

At the 2009 BAFTAs, Mickey Rourke dedicated his Best Actor award to Harris, calling him a "good friend and great actor".

In 2013 Rob Gill and Zeb Moore founded the annual Richard Harris International Film Festival. The Richard Harris Film Festival is one of Ireland's fastest-growing film festivals, growing from just ten films in 2013 to over 115 films in 2017. Each year, one of Harris's sons attends the festival in Limerick.

In 2015, the Limerick Writers' Centre unveiled a commemorative plaque outside Charlie St George's pub on Parnell Street. The pub was a favourite drinking place of Harris on his visits to Limerick. The plaque, celebrating Harris's literary output as part of a Literary Walking Tour of Limerick, was unveiled by his son Jared Harris.

In 1996, Harris was honoured with a commemorative Irish postage stamp for the "Centenary of Irish Cinema", a four-stamp set featuring twelve Irish actors in four Irish films. He was again honoured in 'Irish Abroad' stamps in 2020.

Ridley Scott, who had directed Harris in Gladiator, cast Paul Mescal as Lucius Verus in Gladiator II in part because Mescal resembled Harris, who portrayed his character's grandfather in the original film.

== Acting credits ==
=== Film ===
Year	Title	Role	Notes	Ref.
1959	Alive and Kicking	Lover		
1959	Shake Hands with the Devil	Terence O'Brien		
1959	The Wreck of the Mary Deare	Higgens		
1960	A Terrible Beauty	Sean Reilly		
1961	The Guns of Navarone	Squadron Leader Barnsby RAAF		
1961	The Long and the Short and the Tall	Corporal Edward "Johnno" Johnstone		
1962	Mutiny on the Bounty	Seaman John Mills		
1963	This Sporting Life	Frank Machin		
1964	Red Desert	Corrado Zeller		
1965	The Heroes of Telemark	Knut Straud		
1965	Major Dundee	Capt. Benjamin Tyreen		
1966	The Bible: In The Beginning	Cain		
1966	Hawaii	Rafer Hoxworth		
1967	Caprice	Christopher White		
1967	Camelot	King Arthur		
1970	The Molly Maguires	Detective James McParlan		
1970	A Man Called Horse	John Morgan		
1970	Cromwell	Oliver Cromwell		
1971	Bloomfield	Eitan	Also director and additional writer	
1971	Man in the Wilderness	Zachary Bass		
1973	The Deadly Trackers	Sheriff Sean Kilpatrick		
1974	99 and 44/100% Dead	Harry Crown		
1974	Juggernaut	Lt. Cmdr. Anthony Fallon		
1976	Echoes of a Summer	Eugene Striden	Also executive producer	
1976	Robin and Marian	Richard the Lionheart		
1976	The Return of a Man Called Horse	Lord John Morgan	Also executive producer	
1976	The Cassandra Crossing	Dr. Jonathan Chamberlain		
1977	Gulliver's Travels	Gulliver		
1977	Orca: The Killer Whale	Captain Nolan		
1977	Golden Rendezvous	John Carter		
1978	The Wild Geese	Capt. Rafer Janders		
1979	Ravagers	Falk		
1979	Game for Vultures	David Swansey		
1980	The Last Word	Danny Travis		
1981	Tarzan, the Ape Man	James Parker		
1981	Your Ticket Is No Longer Valid	Jason		
1983	Triumphs of a Man Called Horse	John Morgan		
1984	Highpoint	Lewis Kinney		
1985	Martin's Day	Martin Steckert		
1988	Strike Commando 2	Vic Jenkins		
1990	King of the Wind	King George II		
1990	Mack the Knife	Mr. Peachum		
1990	The Field	'Bull' McCabe		
1992	Patriot Games	Paddy O'Neil		
1992	Unforgiven	English Bob		
1993	Wrestling Ernest Hemingway	Frank		
1994	Silent Tongue	Prescott Roe		
1995	Cry, the Beloved Country	James Jarvis		
1996	Trojan Eddie	John Power		
1997	Savage Hearts	Sir Roger Foxley		
1997	Smilla's Sense of Snow	Dr. Andreas Tork		
1997	This Is the Sea	Old Man Jacobs		
1998	The Barber of Siberia	Douglas McCraken		
1999	To Walk with Lions	George Adamson		
1999	Grizzly Falls	Old Harry		
2000	Gladiator	Marcus Aurelius		
2001	The Pearl	Dr. Karl		
2001	My Kingdom	Sandeman		
2001	Harry Potter and the Philosopher's Stone	Professor Albus Dumbledore		
2002	The Count of Monte Cristo	Abbé Faria		
2002	Harry Potter and the Chamber of Secrets	Professor Albus Dumbledore	Posthumous release	
2004	Kaena: The Prophecy	Opaz (voice)	Posthumous release	

=== Television ===
Year	Title	Role	Notes
1958	ITV Play of the Week	Michael O'Riordan	Episode: "The Iron Harp"
1958	ITV Television Playhouse	Dan Galvin	Episode: "Rest in Violence"
1958	The DuPont Show of the Month	Performer	Episode: "The Hasty Heart"
1960	Armchair Theatre	Major Gaylord	Episode: "Come in Razor Red"
1960	The Art Carney Special	Performer	Episode: "Victory"
1971	The Snow Goose	Philip Rhayader	Television movie
1982	Camelot	King Arthur	Television movie
1988	Maigret	Jules Maigret	Television movie
1993	Abraham	Abraham	Television movie
1995	The Great Kandinsky	Ernest Kandinsky	Television movie
1997	The Hunchback	Claude Frollo	Television movie
2000	The Apocalypse	John the Apostle	Television movie
2003	Julius Caesar	Sulla	Miniseries, 2 episodes; posthumous release

=== Theatre ===
Year	Title	Role	Venue
1947	Easter	Sebastian	Playhouse Limerick
1956–1957	A View from the Bridge	Louis	Comedy Theatre, London
1957	Macbeth	Ross	Theatre Royal Stratford East
1957	You Won't Always Be at the Top	Mick	Theatre Royal Stratford East
1957	And the Wind Blew	Monsignor Gusman	Theatre Royal Stratford East
1957–1958	The Pier	Tommy Ledou	Bristol Old Vic
1958	Love and Lectures	George Bernard Shaw	Theatre Royal Stratford East
1958	The Quare Fellow	Micksar	Comedy Theatre, London
1958	Man, Beast and Virtue	Paulino	Theatre Royal Stratford East
1959	The Dutch Courtesan	Malheureux	Theatre Royal Stratford East
1959	The Ginger Man	Sebastian Dangerfield	Fortune Theatre
1959	Fings Ain't Wot They Used T'Be	George/Sgt. Collins	Theatre Royal Stratford East
1963	The Diary of a Madman	Aksenti Ivanovitch	Royal Court Theatre Downstairs
early 1970s	Becket	Unsure	Haymarket Theatre, London
1981–1985	Camelot	King Arthur	Old Vic Theatre, London; Winter Garden Theatre, Broadway; National Tour
1989–1990	Henry IV	Henry IV	Theatre Royal, Bath
1990	Henry IV	Henry IV	Wyndham's Theatre Wimbledon Theatre, London

== Awards and nominations ==
Year	Award	Category	Nominated work	Result	Ref.
1963	Academy Awards	Best Actor in a Leading Role	This Sporting Life	Nominated	
1991	Academy Awards	Best Actor in a Leading Role	The Field	Nominated	
1968	Golden Globe Awards	Best Motion Picture Actor – Musical/Comedy	Camelot	Won	
1991	Golden Globe Awards	Best Actor in a Motion Picture – Drama	The Field	Nominated	
1968	Grammy Awards	Album of the Year	A Tramp Shining	Nominated	
1968	Grammy Awards	Contemporary Pop Male Vocalist	MacArthur Park	Nominated	
1973	Grammy Awards	Best Spoken Word Recording	Jonathan Livingston Seagull	Won	
1975	Grammy Awards	Best Spoken Word Recording	The Prophet	Nominated	
1963	Cannes Film Festival	Best Actor Award	This Sporting Life	Won	
1964	British Academy Film Award	Best British Actor	This Sporting Life	Nominated	
1971	Berlin International Film Festival	Golden Berlin Bear	Bloomfield	Nominated	
1971	Moscow Film Festival	Best Actor	Cromwell	Won	
1972	Primetime Emmy Award	Outstanding Single Performance by an Actor	The Snow Goose	Nominated	
1990	Evening Standard Theatre Awards	Best Actor	Henry IV	Won	
1991	Laurence Olivier Awards	Best Actor	Henry IV	Nominated	
2000	European Film Awards	Lifetime Achievement Award	—N/a	Won	
2001	Empire Awards	Lifetime Achievement Award	—N/a	Won	
2001	London Film Critics Circle Awards	Dilys Powell Award	—N/a	Won	
2001	Actor Awards	Outstanding Cast in a Motion Picture	Gladiator	Nominated	
2002	British Independent Film Awards	Best Actor	My Kingdom	Nominated	
2002	British Independent Film Awards	Outstanding Contribution by an Actor	—N/a	Won	
2003	Phoenix Film Critics Society Awards	Best Acting Ensemble	Harry Potter and the Chamber of Secrets	Nominated	

== Discography ==
=== Studio albums ===
Year	Album	Chart positions	
Year	Album	US	US CB
1968	A Tramp Shining	4	3
1968	The Yard Went On Forever	27	21
1971	My Boy	71	42
1972	Slides	181	125
1972	Tommy (Note: (narration of some tracks))	5	—
1973	His Greatest Performances	—	—
1974	The Prophet (Note: (music by Arif Mardin, based on The Prophet by Kahlil Gibran))	—	173
1974	I, in the Membership of My Days	—	167
1977	Gulliver Travels	—	—
1992	Little Tramp (Note: (musical))	—	—
2004	The Apocalypse (Note: (The Story of John the Apostle on an Island named Patmos))	—	—

=== Soundtracks ===
Year	Album/Media	Notes
1963	This Sporting Life	Performer: "Here in My Heart"
1965	Major Dundee	Performer: "Dixie"
1966	The Milton Berle Show	Performer: "The Impossible Dream"
1967	Camelot	Original Motion Picture Soundtrack
1968	Toast of the Town	Performer: "Camelot"
1970	The Molly Maguires	Performer: "Eileen Aroon"
1973	Burt Bacharach in Shangri-La	Performer: "Didn't We?"
1976	Echoes of a Summer	Performer: "The Last Castle"
1982	Camelot	Original West End recording
1989	Camp Midnite	Performer: "MacArthur Park"
1989	Mack the Knife	Original Motion Picture Soundtrack
1990	London Symphony Orchestra: "Tommy"	Performer: "Go to the Mirror!"
1992	The Tonight Show Starring Johnny Carson	Performer: "MacArthur Park"
1993	Here's Looking at You, Warner Bros.	Performer: "Camelot"
1996	Unhook the Stars	Performer: "MacArthur Park"
1996	Trojan Eddie	Performer: "Don't Laugh at Me ('Cause I'm a Fool)"
1999	"Weird Al" Yankovic Live!	Credit: "Jurassic Park" (MacArthur Park parody)
2003	"Weird Al" Yankovic: The Ultimate Video Collection	Credit: "Jurassic Park" (MacArthur Park parody)
2008	The Wrecking Crew!	Performer: "MacArthur Park"
2014	The Tonight Show Starring Jimmy Fallon	Performer: "MacArthur Park"
2024	Beetlejuice Beetlejuice	Performer: "MacArthur Park"

=== Singles ===
- "Here in My Heart" (Theme from This Sporting Life)" (1963)
- "How to Handle a Woman (from Camelot)" (1968)
- "MacArthur Park" (1968)
- "Didn't We?" (1968)
- "The Yard Went On Forever" (1968)
- "The Hive" (1969)
- "One of the Nicer Things" (1969)
- "Fill the World With Love" (1969)
- "Ballad of A Man Called Horse" (1970)
- "Morning of the Mourning for Another Kennedy" (1970)
- "My Boy" (1971)
- "Turning Back the Pages" (1972)
- "Half of Every Dream" (1972)
- "Go to the Mirror" (1973)
- "Trilogy (Love, Marriage, Children)" (1974)
- "The Last Castle (Theme from Echoes of a Summer)" (1976)
- "Lilliput (Theme from Gulliver's Travels)" (1977)

=== Compilations ===
- A Tramp Shining (1993)
- The Prophet (1995)
- The Webb Sessions 1968–1969 (1996)
- MacArthur Park (1997)
- Slides/My Boy (2-CD Set) (2005)
- My Boy (2006)
- Man of Words Man of Music The Anthology 1968–1974 (2008)
- Richard Harris & Scott English Greatest Hits (2011)

== See also ==
- List of Irish actors
- List of Academy Award winners and nominees from Ireland
- List of actors with Academy Award nominations
- List of actors with more than one Academy Award nomination in the acting categories
- List of Irish Grammy Award winners and nominees
- List of Golden Globe winners
