= Ann Turkel =

American actress and former model

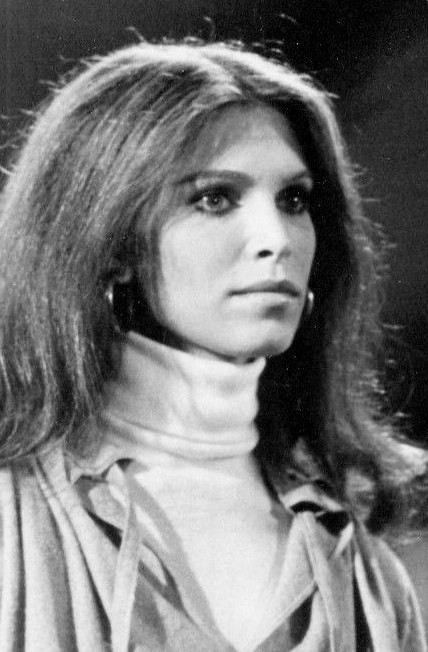
- Turkel in Matt Helm, 1975
- Born: July 16, 1946 (age 80); New York City, New York
- Occupations: Actress, model
- Years active: 1968–present
- Spouse: Richard Harris (m. 1974; div. 1982)

Ann Turkel is an American actress and former model, known for her collaborations with, and marriage to, actor Richard Harris.

== Early life ==
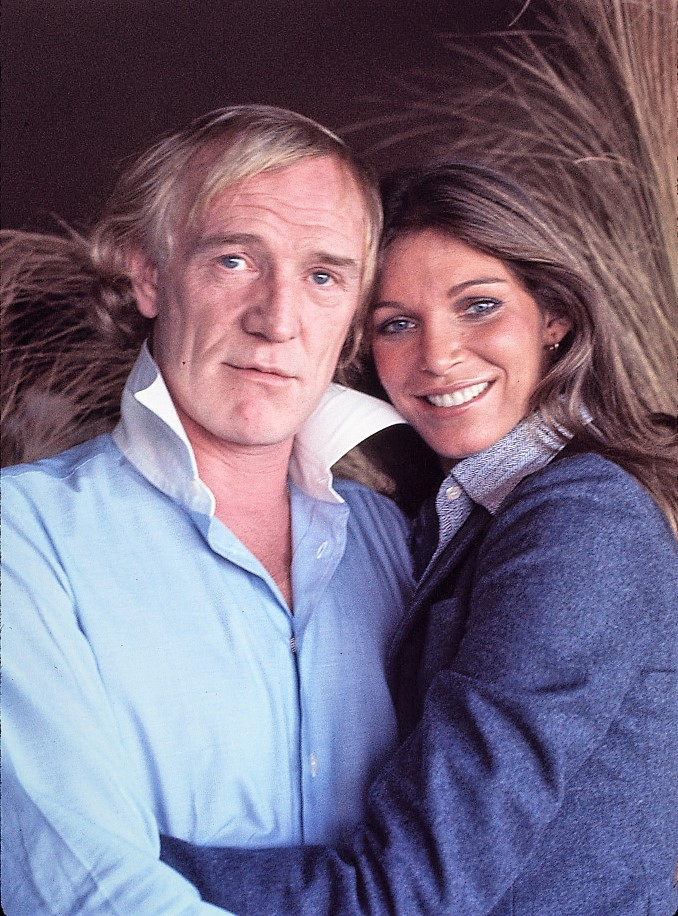
Richard Harris and Ann Turkel in 1977

Born into a Jewish middle-class family and raised in Manhattan, Turkel had, by age 16, studied with both Sanford Meisner at the Neighborhood Playhouse and Philip Burton at the American Musical and Dramatic Academy. (Note: Although the cited source, Cliff Goodwin's Richard Harris biography, specifies "the Musical Theater Academy" as one of the two schools attended by Turkel, no such institution appears to have existed at this time, whereas the similarly named American Musical and Dramatic Academy was, in fact, co-founded and—until his retirement—directed by one of the two named teachers, Philip Burton. (Similarly, the other named school, the Neighborhood Playhouse School of the Theatre, was—aside from one four-year stretch—headed by the other named teacher, Sanford Meisner, for more than half a century.))

== Career ==
In the late 1960s, she was photographed for American Vogue. Patrick Lichfield captured images of her on location in the United Kingdom, the Bahamas, and Italy during the early 1970s, and included them in his 1981 book The Most Beautiful Women.

After a brief appearance in the film Paper Lion (1968), her first major role was in the 1974 film, 99 and 44/100% Dead starring her future husband Richard Harris, and they acted together in The Cassandra Crossing (1976), Golden Rendezvous (1977) and Ravagers (1979).

She portrayed comic strip heroine Modesty Blaise in a 1982 TV pilot.

Her other movie roles included Portrait of a Hitman (1979), with Jack Palance, and Humanoids from the Deep (1980), Deep Space (1988) and The Fear (1995). She also played the role of modeling agent and immortal Kristen in "Chivalry", a season four episode of Highlander: The Series.

== Personal life ==
Turkel and Harris married in 1974 in Beverly Hills. They were divorced in 1982. Despite their divorce, she and Harris remained good friends.

== Filmography ==
=== Film ===
Year	Title	Role
1968	Paper Lion	Susan
1974	99 and 44/100% Dead	Buffy
1976	The Cassandra Crossing	Susan
1977	Golden Rendezvous	Susan Beresford
1979	Portrait of a Hitman	Cathey
1979	Ravagers	Faina
1980	Humanoids from the Deep	Dr. Susan Drake
1988	Deep Space	Carla Sandbourn
1995	The Fear	Leslie
1997	Touch Me	Linda
2006	A-List	Star in bar
2006	Deja Vu	Technician

=== Television ===
Year	Title	Role	Notes
1975	Matt Helm	Maggie Gantry	Pilot episode, first broadcast as ABC Movie of the Week
1978	Greatest Heroes of the Bible	Delilah	Mini-series episode "Samson & Delilah"
1981	Death Ray 2000	Sabina Dorffman	TV movie
1982	Modesty Blaise	Modesty Blaise	TV movie
1982	Massarati and the Brain	Diane : Wilma	TV movie
1982	The Fall Guy	Shawna Ives / Kitty Ives	episode "The Ives Have It"
1982, 1983	Fantasy Island	Rowena Haversham, Leila Proctor	2 episodes
1983	Matt Houston	Maureen Flanders	episode "Here's Another Fine Mess"
1983	The Love Boat	Stacy Banks	episode "Vicki's Dilemma/Discount Romance/ Loser & Still Champ"
1983–1984, 1985	Knight Rider	Adrianne Margeaux / Adrianne St. Clair, Bianca Morgan	S2/E9: "Soul Survivor", S2/E18: "Goliath Returns", S3/E20: "Knight in Retreat"
1984	Masquerade	unnamed	episode "Caribbean Holiday"
1984	The New Mike Hammer	Gail Storrs-Rainey	episode "Catfight"
1985	Riptide	Denise McKean	episode "Baxter and Boz"
1985	Street Hawk	Melanie Ryan / Katherine Reese	episode "Female of the Species"
1985	Hollywood Beat	Lita	"Pilot" episode
1986	Night Court	Judge Eve Gardner	episode "Contempt of Courting"
1986	Scarecrow and Mrs. King	Pam Jentry	episode "Three Little Spies"
1986	Murder, She Wrote	Barbara Bennington	episode "Stage Struck"
1987	Worlds Beyond	Helen Scott	episode "Captain Randolph"
1991	White Hot: The Mysterious Murder of Thelma Todd	Gloria Swanson	TV movie (uncredited)
1991	Silk Stalkings	Roxanne Dockweiler aka Roxy The Doxy	"Pilot" episode
1991	Chance of a Lifetime	Tippi van Norden	TV movie
1992	Down the Shore	unnamed	episode "Waiting for Aldo"
1994	RoboCop: The Series	Louise	episode "What Money Can't Buy"
1995	Highlander	Kristin	episode "Chivalry"
1998	The Hunger	Woman	episode "A River of Night's Dreaming"
1999	Beyond Belief: Fact or Fiction	Mrs. Richerds	Anthology series episode "E-Mail II/Blood Donor/Epitaph/Stiches in Time/Soldier"
