= No Way to Treat a Lady (film) =

1968 film by Jack Smight

- Theatrical release poster
- Directed by: Jack Smight
- Screenplay by: John Gay
- Based on: No Way to Treat a Lady by William Goldman
- Produced by: Sol C. Siegel
- Starring: Rod Steiger; Lee Remick; George Segal; Eileen Heckart; Murray Hamilton; Michael Dunn
- Cinematography: Jack Priestley
- Edited by: Archie Marshek
- Music by: Stanley Myers
- Production company: Sol C. Siegel Productions
- Distributed by: Paramount Pictures
- Release date: March 20, 1968
- Running time: 108 minutes
- Country: United States
- Language: English
- Box office: $3.1 million (US and Canada rentals)

No Way to Treat a Lady is a 1968 American psychological thriller film with elements of black comedy, directed by Jack Smight, and starring Rod Steiger, Lee Remick, George Segal, Eileen Heckart, Murray Hamilton, and Michael Dunn. Adapted by John Gay from William Goldman's 1964 novel of the same name, it follows a serial killer in New York City who impersonates various characters in order to gain the trust of women before murdering them.

Released on March 20, 1968, the film earned $3.1 million domestically, and received largely favorable reviews from critics, with praise for Steiger's performance and the film's blending of horror and dark humor. Segal was nominated for a BAFTA Award for Best Actor in a Supporting Role for his portrayal as Detective Moe Brummel.

A musical comedy adaptation by Douglas J. Cohen was produced in 1987, and revived Off-Broadway in 1996.

== Plot ==
Christopher Gill is a serial killer fixated on his late mother, a noted stage actress. Gill preys on lonely middle-aged women. A Broadway theatre owner and director, he adopts various disguises in order to put his victims at ease and avoid identification, impersonating characters such as an Irish priest, a German plumber, a flamboyant gay hairdresser, a policeman, and a transvestite. Upon gaining his victims' trust, Gill strangles them to death before painting a pair of lips on their foreheads with garish red lipstick.

Police detective Morris Brummell is investigating the murders. Brummel is quoted in a newspaper describing the latest murder as well-planned and well-executed. This appeals to Gill's ego, so he starts telephoning Brummel to discuss the murders and the state of the investigation. Brummel is able to elicit a few scraps of information about Gill, including his obsession with his mother, but for the most part, Gill succeeds in taunting him without giving away his identity.

Meanwhile, Brummel's own overbearing mother wants her son to be more like his successful doctor brother and settle down, while disapproving of his career choice. Brummell's new love interest is Kate Palmer, who glimpsed Gill shortly before he committed the first murder, though not well enough to identify him in a way that would aid the investigation. Palmer wins over Brummell's mother by claiming she is planning to become Jewish, and by pretending to dominate her son.

To lure Gill out, Brummel fabricates a sixth murder victim to the newspaper. Gill, falling for the ruse, calls Brummel and attempts to attribute the murder to a copycat killer; Brummel in turn tricks Gill into describing his physical appearance. After reading a subsequent false newspaper story claiming that a suspect has been arrested for the sixth murder, Gill calls Brummel again and expresses his relief. However, Brummel reveals that the "suspect" has been released, angering Gill, who then decides to target Palmer.

Posing as a caterer, Gill arrives at Palmer's apartment and eventually attacks her, but is forced to flee before he can kill her. During the ensuing police manhunt, Gill is seen entering his theatre via a side door. Investigating the sighting, Brummell chats amiably with Gill, initially unaware that the man before him is Palmer's attacker. As Brummell observes a large portrait of a woman wearing deep red lipstick hanging in the theatre lobby, Gill discloses that the woman is his mother, inadvertently exposing his true identity.

Brummel confronts Gill with his suspicions, but Gill feigns nonchalance. Brummel goes to inspect the costume room, and on his way back, as he is passing the theatre stage, Gill attacks him with the backstage rigging. Brummel is staggered but is able to fatally shoot Gill before he attacks again. A deranged Gill imagines some of his murder victims in the audience and begs Brummel for forgiveness, before succumbing to his wound.

== Cast ==
- Rod Steiger as Christopher Gill
- Lee Remick as Kate Palmer
- George Segal as Morris Brummel
- Eileen Heckart as Mrs. Brummel
- Murray Hamilton as Inspector Haines
- Michael Dunn as Mr. Kupperman
- Martine Bartlett as Alma Mulloy
- Barbara Baxley as Belle Poppie
- Irene Dailey as Mrs. Fitts
- Doris Roberts as Sylvia Poppie
- Ruth White as Mrs. Himmel
- Val Bisoglio as Detective Monaghan
- David Doyle as Lieutenant Dawson
- Kim August as Sadie

== Production ==
=== Screenplay ===
Goldman wrote the original novel while experiencing writer's block, when writing Boys and Girls Together (1964). He was inspired by an article about the Boston Strangler which suggested there might be two stranglers operating, and Goldman wondered what would happen if that were the case and they got jealous of each other.

=== Development ===
In October 1966, it was announced that Sol C. Siegel had signed a three-picture deal with Paramount Pictures, of which the first was to be an adaptation of No Way to Treat a Lady. In December Siegel hired John Gay to adapt the novel into a screenplay. (Jack Smight later said Goldman refused to do the screen adaptation claiming that a novelist should never adapt his or her work for the screen.)

In March 1967, Jack Smight signed to direct. By May, Rod Steiger was playing the lead and George Segal joined the cast in June.

Paramount was helmed by Robert Evans at the time, but Smight said he received more assistance from his executive Peter Bart. "He was enormously helpful to me under some very trying circumstances," said Smight.

Tony Curtis was Evans' choice to play the detective, but Smight insisted that the role go to George Segal.

=== Filming ===
Filming started in June 1967 and mostly took place in Brooklyn Heights, New York. The original plan was to shoot three weeks in New York and do all interiors at Paramount's studio, but in the end, Smight and Siegel decided to shoot the entire film in New York.

"It's Steiger's film", said Segal. "He runs around doing all sorts of different roles and I just stop by and watch him... It's a big, comfortable Hollywood production and I have banker's hours."

Eileen Heckart filmed her scenes during the day while appearing at night in You Know I Can't Hear You When the Water's Running.

Filming was completed by September 1967.

Sol Siegel was reportedly unhappy with the ending, but was overruled by the director and star.

The novel was reissued under Goldman's name in 1968 to coincide with the release of the film. Anthony Boucher of The New York Times called it "dazzling".

Smight was entitled to 15% of the net profits. He says he never received any, but blames this on studio accounting.

== Release ==
=== Box office ===
No Way to Treat a Lady premiered on March 20, 1968, and grossed $3.1 million at the US box office.

=== Critical response ===
Wanda Hale of the New York Daily News praised the film for Steiger's "tour-de-force performance" and its blending of humor and the macabre. The People critic Ernest Betts likened the film to the works of Alfred Hitchcock, praising Steiger's performance and summarizing: "The film has a macabre humor which just takes the edge off the horror and is sometimes hilarious."

Vincent Canby of The New York Times wrote of the film: "Beneath all the outrageous make-up, hairpieces, disguises and belly laughs in No Way to Treat a Lady, there is a curious and ironic comment about the land of stifling mother love... There is nothing wrong with this sort of sheer sensation for its own sake as long as the gags and Steiger's masquerades maintain their bold effrontery. When they don't, however, as happens with increasing frequency toward the end, the mind begins to wander."

On the review aggregator website Rotten Tomatoes, the film holds an approval rating of 89% based on nine reviews, with an average rating of 7.8/10.

Actor George Segal was nominated for a BAFTA Award for Best Actor in a Supporting Role for his portrayal of Detective Moe Brummel.

=== Home media ===
Paramount Home Entertainment released the film on DVD on September 3, 2002. And available in digital media format at iTunes Store and Google Play Store. Under license from Paramount, Scream Factory released the film on Blu-ray for the first time on December 21, 2021.

== Related works ==
In 1987, Douglas J. Cohen adapted the film into a musical comedy, which was revived Off-Broadway by the York Theatre Company in 1996. That production was nominated for an Outer Critics Circle Award for Best Musical Revival.

== See also ==
- List of American films of 1968

== Sources ==
- "No Way to Treat a Lady". Time. March 29, 1968. Archived from the original on October 23, 2012.
