= Joseph Mascolo =

American musician and actor (1929–2016)

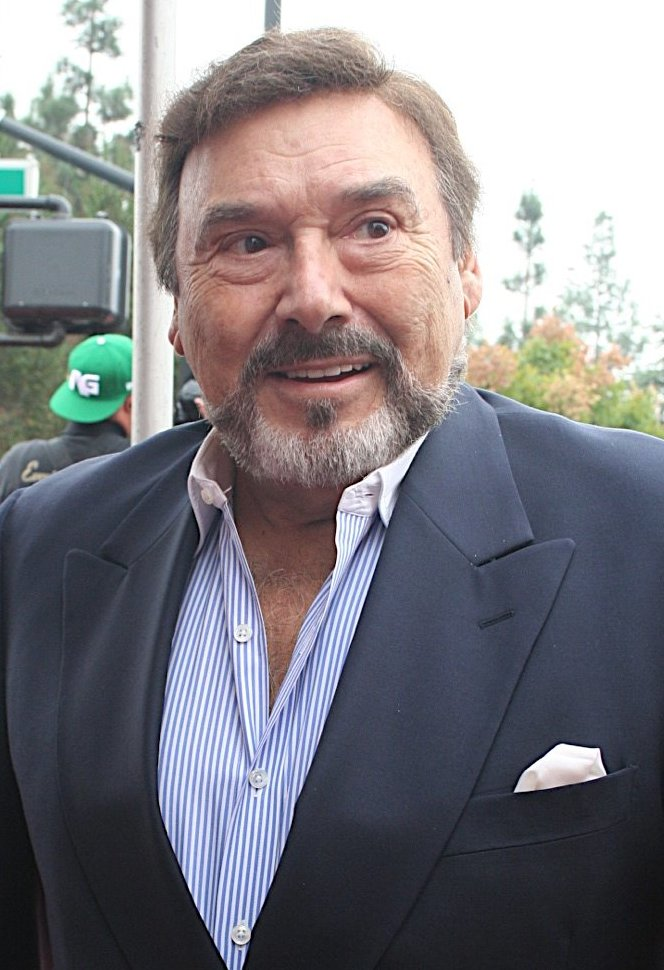
- Mascolo, on the red carpet at the 62nd Annual Mother Goose Parade in San Diego County, 2008
- Born: Joseph Peter Mascolo; March 13, 1929; West Hartford, Connecticut, U.S.
- Died: December 8, 2016 (aged 87); Santa Clarita, California, U.S.
- Resting place: Forest Lawn Memorial Park, Hollywood Hills
- Education: University of Miami; United States Military Academy
- Occupation: Actor
- Years active: 1957–2016
- Spouses: Rose Maimone (m. 1953; died 1986) Patricia Schultz (m. 2005)
- Children: 1

Joseph Peter Mascolo (March 13, 1929 – December 8, 2016) was an American musician and dramatic actor. During his long career, he acted in numerous motion pictures and television series. He played villain Stefano DiMera on NBC's soap opera Days of Our Lives from 1982 to 2016. He also starred as Massimo Marone on the CBS soap opera The Bold and the Beautiful from 2001 to 2006.

== Early life ==
Mascolo was born on March 13, 1929 and was raised in West Hartford, Connecticut. His parents, Anna Mascolo (née DeTuccio; 1908–2010) and Peter Mascolo (1902–2008), were both immigrants from Naples, Italy and had their 80th wedding anniversary in 2008 shortly before his father died. He had one sister, Marie Anna LaVoie (April 24, 1936–April 16, 2024), who was also the widow of Ronald W. LaVoie (1934–December 24, 2022) of Yucca, California. He attended the United States Military Academy after graduating high school. Mascolo attended the University of Miami. To support himself financially, he studied acting under famed acting coach Stella Adler in New York City. He originally was trained in classical music and opera.

== Career ==
=== Theatre ===
Mascolo was in the 1962 production of Night Life as Kazar and the understudy of Neville Brand. He was in the 1966 production of Dinner at Eight as Ricci. Mascolo was in the 1969 production of The Time of Your Life as Blick. His final theatrical appearance was in 1972's That Championship Season as Phil Romano.

=== Film ===
Mascolo's first film appearance was in 1968's Hot Spur as Carlo. He was in 1972's neo-noir action crime–drama film Shaft's Big Score! as Gus Mascola. Mascolo was in 1973's The Spook Who Sat by the Door and 1978's Jaws 2 as Len Peterson. He was in 1981's Sharky's Machine as JoJo Tipps and 1982's Yes, Giorgio Mascolo's last film appearance was in 1986's Heat as Baby.

=== Television ===
Mascolo was best known in the recurring role of Stefano DiMera on Days of Our Lives from 1982 to 1985, returning briefly in 1988, again from 1993 to 2001, and making appearances again since 2007 until Stefano's death in 2016, making his final appearance on February 9, 2017, airing 2 months after his death, and won three Soap Opera Digest Awards. He has also played a wide range of roles on many different series including (but not limited to) a Stefano-like villain named Nicholas Van Buren on General Hospital, and Carlos Alvarez on Santa Barbara. Before achieving his fame, he was seen in the earlier soap operas Where the Heart Is and From These Roots. He also made primetime television appearances on All in the Family, The Eddie Capra Mysteries, Lou Grant and The Rockford Files.

Mascolo portrayed Massimo Marone on CBS's The Bold and the Beautiful beginning August 2001. He decided not to renew his contract with the show in July 2006, due to a lack of storyline and decided to return to Days of Our Lives, where his character Stefano DiMera was resurrected after six years.

Mascolo also appeared in The Incredible Hulk in October 1979, as Mr. Arnold in the episode "Brain Child". 10 years later, he would appear again in NBC's The Trial of the Incredible Hulk, as Albert G. Tendelli, a police confidant of Daredevil. He also appeared in an episode of Hart to Hart on 1/3/84 as villain Mr. Rhodes.

== Personal life and death ==
Mascolo married Rose Maimone in 1953. They had a son named Peter. Maimone died in 1986. In 2005, Mascolo married his second wife, Patricia Schultz. In January 2016, he told Soap Opera Digest that he had suffered a stroke in the spring of 2015. "During my rehab, I thought this would be a good time for Stefano to leave."

Mascolo died on December 8, 2016, in Santa Clarita, California at 87 after years of battling Alzheimer's disease. He was interred at Forest Lawn Memorial Park (Hollywood Hills).

== Theatre ==
Year	Title	Venue	Role	Dates	Notes	Ref.
1962	Night Life	Brooks Atkinson Theatre	Kazar	October 23, 1962 – December 15, 1962	Understudy of Neville Brand.; Directed, written, and produced by Sidney Kingsley.	
1966	Dinner at Eight	Alvin Theatre	Ricci	September 27, 1966 – January 14, 1967	Directed by Tyrone Guthrie, written by George S. Kaufman & Edna Ferber, and produced by Elliot Martin, Lester Osterman, Jr., Alan King & Walter A. Hyman, Ltd.	
1968	West Side Story	Lincoln Center	Schrank	June 24, 1968 – September 7, 1968	Directed and choreography by Lee Theodore and produced by The Musical Theater of Lincoln Center & Richard Rodgers.	
1969	The Time of Your Life	Vivian Beaumont Theatre	Blick	November 6, 1969 – December 20, 1969	Directed by John Hirsch, written by William Saroyan, and produced by Jules Irving.	
1970	Camino Real	Vivian Beaumont Theatre	Officer	January 8, 1970 – February 21, 1970	Directed by Milton Katselas, written by Tennessee Williams, and produced by Jules Irving.	
1970	Operation Sidewinder	Vivian Beaumont Theatre	Colonel Warner	March 12, 1970 – April 25, 1970	Directed by Michael Schultz, written by Sam Shepard, music composed and performed by The Holy Modal Rounders, and produced by Jules Irving.	
1970	The Good Woman of Setzuan	Vivian Beaumont Theatre	Policeman	November 5, 1970 – December 13, 1970	Directed by Robert Symonds, written by Bertolt Brecht, translated by Ralph Manheim, featuring songs by John Lewin & Herbert Pilhofer, and produced by Jules Irving.	
1971	Murderous Angels	Playhouse Theatre	Col. Alcibiade Zbyre	December 20, 1971 – January 9, 1972	Based on the novel of the same name by Conor Cruise O'Brien.; Directed by Gordon Davidson, written by O'Brien, produced by T. Edward Hambleton with arrangement by Elliot Martin & George W. George.	
1972	That Championship Season	Booth Theatre	Phil Romano	September 14, 1972 – April 21, 1974	Understudy of Paul Sorvino.; Directed by A. J. Antoon, written by Jason Miller, and produced by Joseph Papp.	

== Filmography ==
=== Film ===
Year	Title	Role	Notes
1968	Hot Spur	Jason O'Hara	Western film written and directed by R.L. Frost.
1972	Shaft's Big Score!	Gus Mascola	Neo-noir action crime–drama film directed by Gordon Parks.
1973	Happy Mother's Day, Love George	Piccolo	Mystery film produced and directed by Darren McGavin.; Credited as Joe Mascolo.; Also known as Run Stranger, Run.
1973	The Spook Who Sat by the Door	Senator Hennington	Action crime–drama film directed by Ivan Dixon.; Based on the 1969 novel of the same name by Sam Greenlee.
1978	Jaws 2	Len Peterson	Horror thriller film directed by Jeannot Szwarc.
1981	Gangster Wars	Salvatore Maranzano	Crime film directed by Richard C. Sarafian.; Based on the 1981 miniseries The Gangster Chronicles.
1981	Sharky's Machine	Detective Joe "Joe-Joe" Tipps	Drama–thriller film directed by Burt Reynolds.; Adaptation of William Diehl's first novel Sharky's Machine.
1982	Yes, Giorgio	Dominic Giordano	Musical–comedy film directed by Franklin J. Schaffner.; Based on the novel by Anne Piper.
1986	Heat	"Baby"	Action–thriller film directed by Dick Richards and Jerry Jameson.; Based on William Goldman's 1985 novel of the same name.

=== Television ===
Year	Title	Role	Notes
1957	True Story	Tony Brenner	Episode: "The Accident" (S1.E3)
1961	From These Roots	Jack Lander	American soap opera
1961	True Story	Tony Brenner	Episode: "6 May 1961" (S5.E11)
1967	Coronet Blue	Bodyguard	Episode: "A Dozen Demons" (SS1.E3)
1969	The Good Guys	Chauffeur	Episode: "The World's Second Greatest Lover" (S1.E18)
1969	The Doctors	Policeman	Episode: "#1.1668" (S6.E96, 30 Apr 1969)
1969	The Doctors	Policeman	Episode: "#1.1669" (S6.E97, 1 May 1969)
1973	The Resolution of Mossie Wax	Guest	TV movie. Drama film directed by Bob Walsh.
1973	Where the Heart Is	Ed Lucas	Episode: "#1.868"
1973	Where the Heart Is	Ed Lucas	Episode: "#1.873"
1974	All in the Family	Pat Bushmill	Episode: "Gloria's Boyfriend" (S4.E19)
1974	Dominic's Dream	Dominic Bente	Pilot sitcom written and directed by Garry Marshall.
1975	Baretta	Frank Cassell	Episode: "He'll Never See Daylight" (S1.E1, Pilot)
1975–1976	Bronk	Mayor Pete Santori	Contract role
1976	NBC Special Treat	Papa	Episode: "Papa and Me" (S1.E5)
1976	Kojak	Detective Jeff Braddock	Episode: "A Summer Madness" (S4.E2)
1976	Monster Squad	Lawrence of Moravia	Episode: "Lawrence of Moravia" (S1.E12)
1976	ABC Afterschool Special	Mr. Singleton	Episode: "Mighty Moose and the Quarterback Kid" (S5.E3)
1977	Switch	Phillip Aspen / Martin Lorrimer	Episode: "Portraits of Death" (S2.E13)
1977	Stonestreet: Who Killed the Centerfold Model?	Max Pierce	TV movie. Mystery film directed by Russ Mayberry.
1977	The Rockford Files	Gibby	Episode: "Crack Back" (S3.E21)
1978	The Eddie Capra Mysteries	Joe Callen/Dr. David Weller	Episode: "Dirge for a Dead Dachshund" (S1.E6)
1978	Lou Grant	McIntyre	Episode: "Babies" (S2.E10)
1979	The Incredible Hulk	Mr. Arnold	Episode: "Brain Child" (S3.E3)
1981	The Gangster Chronicles	Salvatore Maranzano	Miniseries directed by Richard C. Sarafian.
1982–2017	Days of Our Lives	Stefano DiMera	Contract role (1982–85; 1993–2001; 2007–16); Recurring (1988; 2016–17)
1984	Hart to Hart	Nick Rhodes	Episode: "Harts on the Run" (S5.E12)
1984	Ernie Kovacs: Between the Laughter	Richards	TV movie. Biographical film directed by Lamont Johnson and written by April Smith.
1985	Comedy Factory	Peter Wagner	Episode: "Side by Side" (S1.E1, Pilot)
1985	Brothers	Howard Dovall	Episode: "A House Divided" (S2.E10)
1985	Crazy Like a Fox	Guest	Episode: "Fox in 3/4 Time" (S2.E5)
1985	Santa Barbara	Carlo Alvarez	Recurring
1986	CBS Schoolbreak Special	Ed Martinson	Episode: "Have You Tried Talking to Patty?" (S3.E2)
1986	Hill Street Blues	Melvin Jardino	Episode: "I Want My Hill Street Blues" (S6.E15)
1986	Joe Bash	Captain Charles Taylor	Episode: "Joe's First Partner (S1.E5)
1987	Hunter	Mick Shaughnessy	Episode: "Shades" (S3.E22)
1987	It's Garry Shandling's Show	Lieutenant Gerard	Episode: "The Fugitive" (S2.E3)
1987	Rags to Riches	Viktor Leskov	Episode: "Russian Holiday" (S2.E10)
1988	The Equalizer	Tony Costa	Episode: "Always a Lady" (S3.E22)
1989	General Hospital	Nicholas Van Buren	Recurring
1989	The Trial of the Incredible Hulk	Albert G. Tendelli	TV movie. Superhero film directed by Bill Bixby.
2001–2006	The Bold and the Beautiful	Massimo Marone IV	Contract role (2001–06)
