= The Silent Gondoliers =

1983 novel by William Goldman

- First edition
- Author: William Goldman
- Language: English
- Publication date: 1983
- Publication place: United States
- Pages: 110
- ISBN: 0-345-31279-1

The Silent Gondoliers is a 1983 novel by William Goldman, written under the pseudonym of "S. Morgenstern". The novel purports to explain why the gondoliers of Venice no longer sing, through the story of the protagonist Luigi. Chapters I and II build up further mythology behind the name Morgenstern and the backstory of Gondolierian history, and the tale of Luigi actually starts in Chapter III.

It was published by Del Rey Books in hardcover in 1983, and a trade paperback version came out from Del Rey in 2001. Paul Giovanopoulos provided 20 pen-and-ink illustrations for the story.

== Author ==
Goldman also uses the pseudonym "S. Morgenstern" in his better-known novel, The Princess Bride. However, in this tale, he writes as if he remembers spending Christmas in Venice, with the echo of singing gondoliers, once as a child and again with his wife and daughters. The story haunts him and he begins to research. This leads him into the trail of why gondoliers can no longer sing well, contrary to the belief that "gondoliers are the greatest singers of the world".

== Synopsis ==
Luigi is an aspiring gondolier in Venice. Though he is a talented boatman, he is a terrible singer, and people get stomach cramps and migraines just listening to him. As gondoliers have a reputation as the best singers in the world, and customers expect it as part of the service, a tone-deaf gondolier is unacceptable, no matter how skilled he is with his oar..

As the story unfolds, his fiancee Laura Lorenzini breaks off her engagement, and marries a 'better suitor'. Though he is an awful singer, Luigi's friends are fond of him and his affable nature. It is agreed that although he cannot be a gondolier, he can work in the Tavern, the Gondoliers' exclusive haunt. But over time he becomes dissatisfied.

Luigi disappears for many years, and is turned away from various singing teachers. Finally Piccoli agrees to teach him, although unbeknown to Luigi, Piccoli has not taught in many years and is deaf. Luigi eventually returns to Venice and sings, but his singing is even worse because it has become more powerful. When a 'killer storm' approaches, everyone is in danger. When the Church of Souls of Those Who Died for the Sea, the most sacred building to the Gondoliers, is struck by lightning, even the most skilled gondoliers in Venice are too overcome with fear to go out and call for the Great Fireboat of Venice to save their church from fire.

Finally, Luigi manages to reach the Great Fireboat of Venice, which sets out to save the church. The other gondoliers notice that Luigi did not return with the fireboat, and discover him sailing on the turbulent waters of the Grand Canal. Covered by the noise of the storm, Luigi is finally able to realize his dream of singing on the Grand Canal, singing songs from Bellini and all the solos he knows. All the gondoliers witness this and they talk about it all night.

After the storm, the Queen of Corsica visits. She requests a gondolier to sing for her on her royal boat. One gondolier starts to sing ’O sole mio, but sings terribly to the queen's disgust. It is discovered that all gondoliers have started to sing terribly from that moment on, and so no-one asks them to sing anymore.

Luigi is reinstated as a gondolier, without the requirement to sing. After a long career and happy life, as with all gondoliers when they die, Luigi is set in his black boat and pushed out into the Adriatic Sea.

== Background ==
Goldman says he got the idea to write the book when visiting Venice with his then-wife:

We were on one of the water buses, Vaporettos, and a bunch of gondoliers came rowing down the canal and they were quiet. I suddenly turned to [my wife] Ilene and I said, 'I know why the gondoliers don't sing' and we got off the bus immediately and I went running back to the hotel. I wrote the story down in about five minutes on a piece of paper.

Goldman says this was one of the few times that a novel had popped into his head "fully formed", the other being No Way to Treat a Lady.
