= Elliott Kastner =

American film producer (1930–2010)

- Born: January 7, 1930; New York City, U.S.
- Died: June 30, 2010 (aged 80); London, England, UK
- Education: University of Miami; Columbia University
- Occupation: Film producer
- Years active: 1965–2010
- Spouse(s): Carolyn Hughes (m. 1960; div. 197?); Tessa Kennedy (m. 1971; div. 199?)
- Children: 2

Elliott Kastner (January 7, 1930 – June 30, 2010) was an American film producer, whose best known credits include Where Eagles Dare (1968), The Long Goodbye (1973), The Missouri Breaks (1976), and Angel Heart (1987).

== Early life and career ==
Kastner was born to a Jewish family in New York City. His father died when he was young, and he was raised by his mother in Harlem.

He attended the University of Miami and Columbia University. During the 1950s, he was stationed with United States European Command in Frankfurt and Paris.

=== Agent ===
Kastner worked in the mail room at the William Morris Agency in New York, becoming a literary agent. He moved to Los Angeles and became a talent agent at the Music Corporation of America (MCA). When that agency merged with Decca Records, which owned Universal Pictures, Lew Wasserman, the president of MCA, made Kastner vice president of production at Universal. He worked there for two years before becoming an independent producer.

== Producer ==
Kastner's first film as producer was Bus Riley's Back in Town (1965) based on a script by William Inge and starring Ann-Margret and Michael Parks. Inge was so unhappy with the final result he requested his name be taken off the credits and the film was not a commercial or critical success.

=== Jerry Gershwin ===
Kastner then teamed up with producer Jerry Gershwin to form Winkast Film Productions, based at Pinewood Studios in Buckinghamshire. They wound up making eleven movies together, the first of which was the highly popular Harper (1966) from a novel by Ross Macdonald and directed by Jack Smight. The screenplay was written by William Goldman who had been talking to Kastner about a film of Goldman's novel Boys and Girls Together; Goldman suggested that the Ross MacDonald Lew Archer series would make a good movie, and Kastner bought the rights. Kastner then got Goldman to write a sequel The Chill, but it was never made.

Kastner's third film was Kaleidescope (1966), made in England, directed by Smight with Warren Beatty and Susannah York. Kastner and Gershwin raised the finance independently, and sold it to a studio, Warner Bros. "That was the beginning of producers taking control creatively by self financing", said his stepson Cassian Elwes, who later became a producer himself.

Winkast then made The Bobo (1968), starring Peter Sellers and his then-wife Britt Ekland, and Sweet November (1968), with Sandy Dennis. Both were released through Warners, but Sol Madrid (1968) was released through MGM.

Sol Madrid was directed by Brian G. Hutton who helmed Kastner and Gershwin's next film, Where Eagles Dare (1968). The producer had managed to persuade Alistair MacLean to write an original screenplay as a vehicle for Richard Burton (it was later turned into a novel). The movie was a big hit and led to Kastner adapting several other MacLean stories and working with Burton a number of other times. Other MacLean adaptations included When Eight Bells Toll (1971), Fear is the Key and Breakheart Pass (1975).

Less popular was The Night of the Following Day (1969) with Marlon Brando.

Burton was meant to star in Laughter in the Dark (1969) but was fired during filming and replaced by Nicol Williamson. Kastner had involvement in Man on Horseback (1969).

In the late 1960s Kastner wanted rock star Jim Morrison to play Billy the Kid in a movie adaption of Michael McClure's The Beard.

Kastner also partnered with noted producers Alan Ladd, Jr. and Jay Kanter between 1969 and 1972, producing with them the films The Walking Stick, A Severed Head, Tam-Lin, Villain, The Nightcomers (directed by Michael Winner, with Marlon Brando), X Y & Zee (with Burton's then-wife Elizabeth Taylor) and Fear Is the Key (from a novel by Alistair MacLean).

Kastner is also famous for his film adaptations of three Raymond Chandler's novels based on the exploits of one of Chandler's most famous creations, Philip Marlowe: The Long Goodbye (1973), Farewell, My Lovely (1975) and The Big Sleep (1978). The first starred Elliot Gould and was directed by Robert Altman, with finance from United Artists. The latter two both starred Robert Mitchum as Marlowe and were financed by Lew Grade's ITC; The Big Sleep was shot in Britain under the direction of Michael Winner.

As part of the ITC deal, Kastner produced Dogpound Shuffle.

Kastner admired Altman's work on The Long Goodbye and wanted to collaborate with him in a production of 92 in the Shade by Tom McGuane, however the two men had a disagreement and the film was directed by McGuane himself. It was one of three McGuane projects produced by Kastner, the others being Ranchlo Deluxe and The Missouri Breaks. The latter starred Marlon Brando and Jack Nicholson. Kastner famously got each star to commit by lying and telling them the other one had already signed.

Around this time he also produced A Little Night Music which was a huge flop.

In a 1977 article Mario Puzo wrote about the Cannes Film Festival said that a group of producers regarded Kastner as "the greatest genius in the movie business... [he] has put together very big films, nearly all of which are flops. And yet he can get the money and stars to produce any movie he decides to. He does it with a phone, irresistible charm, and shameless chutzpah."

Colleague Jay Kanter said Kastner's reputation in Hollywood was "Some good, some bad. He was relentless in pursuing what he wanted. I mean dogged in his pursuit." He added "If Elliott believed in some material, he'd never hesitate to put his own money into buying it and hiring writers to develop a screenplay. He was passionate about what he did, and he was a terrific salesman as well."

His obituary in the Guardian stated that "Kastner was relentless in his pursuit of getting what he wanted. Mostly he wanted to entice well-known playwrights and novelists to write screenplays, or gain the rights of those works whose authors were no longer around to cajole."

== Later years ==
Kastner planned to make Nightwork from a novel by Irwin Shaw directed by Frank Perry but the film was not made.

He made Absolution starring Richard Burton.

Kastner independently financed Oxford Blues which he sold to MGM. Peter Bart, an executive at MGM at the time, called Kastner "a maverick filmmaker... a stooped, rumpled, wizened little man" who "had a reputation in the industry for coming up with deals that were far more intriguing than his movies. Though over the years he’d produced a couple of highprofile films... he’d also proven remarkably adept at funding obscure films that failed to find audiences." Bart claims the film was made for $1.8 million but Kastner sold it to MGM for $6 million, including his $1 million fee.

In the mid-1980s Kastner frequently worked with his step son, Cassian Elwes. In the 1970s he had mentored Arnon Milchan.

Kastner produced Heat from a novel by William Goldman starring Burt Reynolds. Robert Altman was going to direct but he and Kastner clashed and Altman left the project. Kastner replaced him with Dick Richards, who had directed Farewell My Lovely for Kastner, but Richards clashed with Reynolds and left the project during filming.

In 1987 Kastner and Andre Blay bought 70% of Cinema Group Home video. In the late 1980s he was going to make Jericho with Marlon Brando. Instead he made Angel Heart with Alan Parker. Parker called Kastner " an irascible gadfly in the film industry, having been involved with more films than Technicolor and outlived fifty studio heads and as many lawsuits. Many was the time I’ve seen him ‘work’ the tables in the Pinewood Studios restaurant on the way to the men's room. He usually stayed just long enough to blow his nose in your napkin, dispense some wickedly cynical aphorism about the movies and move on. There is an oft-told story that Marlon Brando finally said yes to doing Missouri Breaks because he could not face the prospect of Elliott Kastner, on his knees, crying in front of him one more time."

In 1988 he declared bankruptcy.

In the late 1990s he bought Roger Corman's Concorde New Horizons for $100 million.

Kastner had a financial interest in A Chorus of Disapproval directed by Michael Winner.

Kastner's career was marked by a number of lawsuits, including with Mickey Rourke and David McClintick, and over the film Frank and Jesse.

Kastner was sued by Marlon Brando over a proposed musical film version of Treasure Island.

== Family ==
He was married and divorced twice. In 1960 he first married actor Carolyn Hughes. He was the second husband of the interior designer Tessa Kennedy (m 1971), with whom he had two children, a son, Dillon and a daughter, Milica. He had been introduced to Kennedy by Warren Beatty.

"The marriage worked very well", says Kennedy. "For eight years we'd only spend three or four days a month together. It wouldn't have lasted more than a year if we'd been together because we're very different and volatile." Kennedy and Kastner separated in 1995.

He was also a stepfather to Kennedy's three sons from a previous marriage: film producer Cassian Elwes, artist Damian Elwes and actor Cary Elwes.

== Death ==
Elliott Kastner died of cancer on June 30, 2010, in London at the age of 80.

Towards the end of his life he had approached David Thomson to see if he was interested in writing Kastner's biography. Thomson recalled:

He was the way producers were once supposed to be—showily cynical yet deeply attached to his projects; absolutely aware that a producer had to make a lot of pictures before the trash and the triumphs got sorted out; belligerent but sensitive, tough-mouthed sometimes; arrogant and Cagneyesque, but very well read; devoted to writers and alert to children... He admitted he had been a scoundrel sometimes—you had to be—but he knew there was good work to show for it.

According to one obituary he: "Was noted for his skill in bringing together writers, directors and stars for generally commercial (though sometimes surprisingly cerebral) films. He excelled in literary adaptations, from popular works such as those of Raymond Chandler and Alistair MacLean to the more esoteric output of such writers as Iris Murdoch, Vladimir Nabokov and Edna O'Brien. He also favoured tales with strong, single-minded heroes and produced films featuring such actors as Marlon Brando, Paul Newman, Jack Nicholson, Robert Mitchum, Burt Reynolds and Richard Burton."

In 2014 it was announced a deal had been struck to release all of his films on DVD.

== Filmography ==
He was a producer in all films unless otherwise noted.

=== Film ===
Year	Film	Credit	Notes	Ref.
1965	Bus Riley's Back in Town			
1966	Harper			
1966	Kaleidoscope			
1967	The Bobo			
1968	Sol Madrid			
1968	Sweet November			
1968	Where Eagles Dare			
1969	The Night of the Following Day	Executive producer		
1969	Man on Horseback	Executive producer		
1969	Laughter in the Dark			
1970	The Walking Stick	Executive producer		
1970	Tam-Lin	Executive producer		
1970	A Severed Head			
1971	When Eight Bells Toll			
1971	Villain	Executive producer		
1971	The Nightcomers	Executive producer	Uncredited	
1972	X Y & Zee	Executive producer		
1972	Cry for Me, Billy	Executive producer		
1972	Fear Is the Key	Executive producer		
1973	The Long Goodbye	Executive producer		
1973	Jeremy			
1973	Cops and Robbers			
1974	11 Harrowhouse			
1975	Rancho Deluxe			
1975	Farewell, My Lovely	Executive producer		
1975	Russian Roulette	Executive producer		
1975	92 in the Shade	Executive producer		
1975	Breakheart Pass	Executive producer		
1975	Dogpound Shuffle			
1976	The Missouri Breaks			
1976	Swashbuckler	Executive producer		
1977	Black Joy			
1977	A Little Night Music			
1977	Equus			
1977	The Stick Up		Uncredited	
1978	The Big Sleep			
1978	Absolution			
1979	Goldengirl			
1979	Yesterday's Hero	Executive producer		
1980	Saturn 3	Executive producer	Uncredited	
1980	North Sea Hijack			
1980	The First Deadly Sin	Executive producer		
1982	Death Valley			
1983	Man, Woman and Child	Executive producer		
1984	Oxford Blues			
1984	Garbo Talks			
1984	Big Truck and Sister Clare	Executive producer		
1986	Nomads			
1986	Heat		Uncredited	
1987	Angel Heart			
1987	White of the Eye			
1987	Zombie High			
1988	Jack's Back		Uncredited	
1988	The Blob			
1988	Homeboy			
1988	Zits			
1989	Never on Tuesday			
1994	Frank and Jesse			
1996	Love Is All There Is			
2001	Sweet November			
2005	Opa!		Final film as a producer	

Miscellaneous crew

Year	Film	Role
1973	Cops and Robbers	Presenter
1975	Rancho Deluxe	Presenter
1975	Russian Roulette	Presenter
1975	92 in the Shade	Presenter
1976	The Missouri Breaks	Presenter
1977	Black Joy	Presenter
1977	The Stick Up	Presenter
1978	The Medusa Touch	In association with
1978	Absolution	Presenter
1979	Yesterday's Hero	Presenter
1980	Saturn 3	Presents in association with
1980	North Sea Hijack	Presenter
1980	The First Deadly Sin	Presenter
1986	Heat	Presenter
1988	The Blob	Presenter
1989	A Chorus of Disapproval	Presenter

Thanks

Year	Film	Role
1965	Wild Seed	Special thanks
1979	Natural Enemies	Special thanks
1989	Warm Summer Rain	The producers wish to thank
1991	The Dark Backward	Grateful acknowledgment
2011	A Thousand Kisses Deep	Special thanks
2012	Papadopoulos & Sons	Dedicated to the memory of

==== Unmade films ====
- The Children of Sanchez (1962)
- Flight into Camden from novel by David Storey (1962)
- Hanno's Doll with Jane Fonda and Stanley Kramer (1962)
- adaptation of Boys and Girls Together (1966) – to be directed by Sydney Pollack
- The Telephone Book an original script by Harry Cohn (1966)
- Sard Harker based on a book by John Masefield
- Fruit of the Poppy by Robert Wilder
- Chow Charlie Baby based on novel by David Dodge
- The Violent Land a western to be directed by Brian Hutton
- Revolutionary Road based on novel by Richard Yates
- musical adaptation of Treasure Island for Cinema Center Films (1968)
- The Chill (1967) – sequel to Harper – at one stage to be directed by Sam Peckinpah
- Rose of Tibet (late 1960s)
- Hall of Mirrors (late 1960s)
- Caribbean (late 1960s)
- The Violent Land (late 1960s)
- Hive of Glass (late 1960s)
- Sard Harder (late 1960s)
- Confidence Man (late 1960s)
- adaptation of Gore Vidal's Julian with script by Vidal (1968)
- adaptation of The Forty Days of Musa Daugh (1969)
- The Pictures of Fidelman (1971) based on novel by Bernard Malmud
- Sleep is for the Rich based on novel by Donald MacKenzie (1972)
- The Boy Who Invented the Bubble Gun (1973)
- Untitled Tony Bennett/Ruby Braff-George Barnes Quartet Documentary a.k.a. This Funny World (working title) (1973)
- adaptation of The Fountainhead (1975) – to be directed by Michael Cimino
- Gunfighters (1977)
- Serpentine based on life of Charles Sobhraj (1977)
- The Quest of St. James Elk (1981) – to be directed by John McTiernan
- adaptation of The Deer Park by Norman Mailer (1987)
- adaptation of book Indecent Exposure (1987)
- Jericho with Marlon Brando (1988)
- The Madman's Tale based on novel by John Kaztenbach (2004)

=== Television ===
Year	Title	Notes
1969	Michael Kohlhaas	
1969	Phantom India	Documentary
1979	Mr. Horn	Television film

== Theatre credits ==
- Two Weeks Somewhere Else by Herman Raucher (1966)
- Marilyn! The Musical (1983)
