= Tinsel (novel) =

1979 novel by William Goldman

- First edition
- Author: William Goldman
- Cover artist: Richard Huebner
- Language: English
- Publisher: Delacorte Press
- Publication date: 1979
- Publication place: United States
- Pages: 342
- ISBN: 0-385-29031-4

Tinsel is a 1979 novel written by William Goldman. It was the third of a four-book deal he had with Delacorte Press after Marathon Man and Magic. He called it "my Hollywood novel."

== Background ==
Goldman had gone through an intense period of work writing screenplays and realised it had been two years since he wrote anything that was just for him, so decided to write a novel.

He says he began writing Tinsel on April Fools' Day 1978 and finished it five months later. Goldman actually started to write two novels at the same time, both about Hollywood. He would work three pages on one, three pages on the other, and said at the end of the first week the second novel, which became Tinsel "was working alright, so I just gave up on the other". He finished Tinsel in August.

Goldman said in a 1979 interview that he was motivated to write the novel to explore the treatment of women in Hollywood:

There are a couple of basic truths about this town. One is that nobody knows anything about what will work. It's all a search for past magic. Those who can no longer produce it are useless. The other truth is that everyone in the movie community is searching for heat. John Travolta was the hottest thing ever-ever; only Dustin Hoffman after The Graduate and Midnight Cowboy was comparable. Then Travolta made a movie with Lily Tomlin (Moment by Moment) and where were his fans? Farrah Fawcett is a year from game shows. This is why we're all so nervous. There's no carry over of affection. It's why nobody can cut their price. You're worth a million dollars or you're unemployed. That's what happened to Elizabeth Taylor and what I wanted to tell in Tinsel. What happens to the women of Hollywood?

He also said the novel was similar to his earlier novel Boys and Girls Together. "It's about five people in a town and how their lives develop and interact, and it's fairly long for me, longer than novels I've been doing lately."

== Reception ==
Larry McMurtry, reviewing the book for the New York Times, wrote, "Mr. Goldman never gets beneath the stereotypes ... Some of the dialogue is bright and readable, but it doesn't begin to fill in the cracks."

== Notes ==
- Brady, John (1981). The Craft of the Screenwriter.
