= James Goldman =

American playwright and screenwriter (1927–1998)

- Born: James Goldman; June 30, 1927; Chicago, Illinois, U.S.
- Died: October 28, 1998 (aged 71); New York City, U.S.
- Spouses: Marie McKeon (m. 1962; div. 1972); Barbara Goldman (m. 1975)
- Children: 2
- Relatives: William Goldman (brother)

James Goldman (June 30, 1927 – October 28, 1998) was an American playwright and screenwriter. He won an Academy Award for his screenplay The Lion in Winter (1968). His younger brother was novelist and screenwriter William Goldman.

== Biography ==
Born on June 30, 1927, the first son of a Jewish family in Chicago, Illinois, Goldman grew up primarily in Highland Park, Illinois, a Chicago suburb. He is most noted as the playwright of The Lion in Winter and for writing the screenplay of its 1968 film adaptation, for which he received an Academy Award. He also wrote the book for the Broadway musical Follies (1971), which was nominated for a Tony Award.

He attended the University of Chicago and Columbia University, earning a master's degree and studying music criticism. In 1952, Goldman was drafted into the U.S. Army. After his discharge in 1954, he pursued a career as a playwright.

Goldman died in 1998 from a heart attack in New York City. He had lived there for many years.

== Works ==
=== Theatre ===
- Blood, Sweat and Stanley Poole (1961), with William Goldman
- They Might Be Giants (1961), London
- A Family Affair (1962), musical, book only (lyrics by William Goldman, music by John Kander)
- The Lion in Winter (1966, revived 1999)
- Follies (1971, revived 2001 and 2011), musical, book only (lyrics and music by Stephen Sondheim), Tony nomination for Best Book of a Musical
- Tolstoy (1996)

=== Film and television ===
- Evening Primrose (1966), book only (music and lyrics by Stephen Sondheim)
- The Lion in Winter (1968)
- They Might Be Giants (1971)
- Nicholas and Alexandra (1971)
- Robin and Marian (1976)
- Oliver Twist (1982)
- White Nights (1985)
- Anna Karenina (1985)
- Anastasia: The Mystery of Anna (1986)
- Queenie (1987) (as Winston Beard)

=== Novels ===
- Waldorf (1965)
- The Man From Greek and Roman (1974)
- Myself as Witness (1979)
- Fulton County (1989)
