= William Goldman =

American writer (1931–2018)

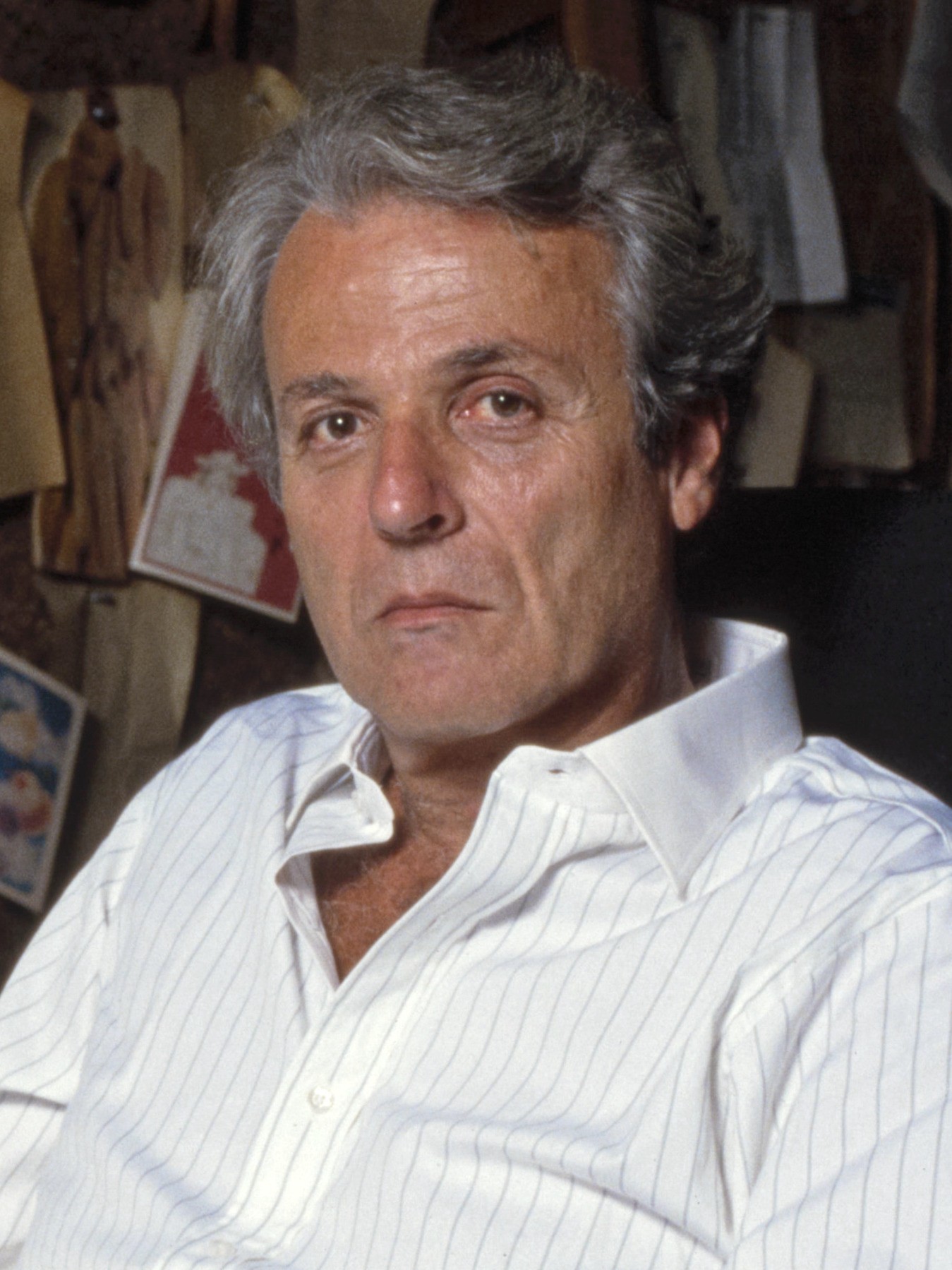
- Goldman in 1987
- Born: August 12, 1931; Chicago, Illinois, U.S.
- Died: November 16, 2018 (aged 87); New York City, U.S.
- Education: Oberlin College (BA); Columbia University (MA)
- Occupations: Non-fiction author; novelist; playwright; screenwriter
- Spouse: Ilene Jones (m. 1961; div. 1991)
- Children: 2
- Relatives: James Goldman (brother)
- Writing career
- Pen name: S. Morgenstern, Harry Longbaugh
- Years active: 1957–2015
- Genres: Drama, fiction, literature, thriller

William Goldman (August 12, 1931 – November 16, 2018) was an American novelist, screenwriter and playwright who wrote 16 novels and numerous screenplays in a career spanning seven decades. He received the Academy Award for Best Original Screenplay and Best Screenplay from the BAFTAs and Golden Globes for his first original screenplay, Butch Cassidy and the Sundance Kid (1969), and he received the Academy Award for Best Adapted Screenplay for All the President's Men (1976). Both of these films have been inducted into the National Film Registry by the Library of Congress, along with The Princess Bride (1987) which he adapted from his 1973 novel, and all three were included on the 2006 list by the Writers Guild of America of the 101 Greatest Screenplays. Among his other accolades were three Writers Guild of America Awards, including the 1985 Laurel Award for Screenwriting Achievement, two Edgar Awards for Best Motion Picture Screenplay, and a Hugo Award for Best Dramatic Presentation.

Goldman collaborated twice each with George Roy Hill, Peter Yates, Rob Reiner and Simon West, and thrice with Richard Attenborough. He adapted his novels Marathon Man (1974, filmed in 1976), Magic (1976, filmed in 1978), and Heat (1985, filmed in 1986 and as Wild Card in 2015.) His screenplays for Misery (1990), Hearts in Atlantis (2001), and Dreamcatcher (2003) were all adapted from works by Stephen King, and he later adapted Misery for the stage in 2012. His other produced plays, Blood, Sweat and Stanley Poole (1961) and A Family Affair (1962) were collaborations with his brother James Goldman, also an Academy Award-winning writer. Goldman's other screenplays include The Stepford Wives (1975), A Bridge Too Far (1977), Chaplin (1992) and The Ghost and the Darkness (1996), and he was an uncredited script doctor on Twins (1988), A Few Good Men (1992), Indecent Proposal, Last Action Hero (both 1993), and Fierce Creatures (1997). In his later years he served as a mentor to a number of writers, including A Few Good Men writer Aaron Sorkin. His nonfiction books include The Season: A Candid Look at Broadway (1969), the memoirs Adventures in the Screen Trade (1983) and Which Lie Did I Tell? (2000), and the essay collection The Big Picture (2001).

Though Goldman was self-effacing of his own work, Sean Egan said his achievements were made "without ever lunging for the lowest common denominator. Although his body of work has been consumed by millions, he has never let his populism overwhelm a glittering intelligence and penchant for upending expectation."

== Early life and education ==
Goldman was born in Chicago on August 12, 1931, the second son of Marion (née Weil; 1904–1993) and Maurice Clarence Goldman (1893–1947). He grew up in Highland Park, Illinois in a Jewish family. Goldman's father was a successful businessman, working in Chicago and in a partnership, but he suffered from alcoholism, which cost him his business. He "came home to live and he was in his pajamas for the last five years of his life," according to Goldman. His father died by suicide while Goldman was still in high school. It was a 15-year-old Goldman who discovered the body. His mother was deaf, which created additional stress in the home.

=== Education and military service ===
Goldman attended Oberlin College in Oberlin, Ohio, and he began to write when he took a creative-writing course there, according to his memoir Adventures in the Screen Trade (1983). His grades in the class were "horrible". He was an editor of Oberlin's literary magazine, and he submitted his short stories to it anonymously. He recalls that the other editors read his submissions and remarked, "We can't possibly publish this shit."

Goldman graduated from college in 1952 during the Korean War, and he was soon drafted into the Army. He was assigned as a clerk in The Pentagon Defense headquarters because he knew how to type, and he was discharged with the rank of corporal in September 1954.

He returned to graduate studies under the G.I. Bill, earning a Master of Arts degree at Columbia University and graduating in 1956. Throughout this period, he was writing short stories in the evenings, but he struggled to have them published.

== Career ==
=== Novelist ===
Goldman did not originally plan to become a screenwriter. His main interests were poetry, short stories, and novels. In 1956, he completed a master's thesis at Columbia University on the comedy of manners in America.

His older brother James Goldman was a playwright and screenwriter. They shared an apartment in New York with their friend John Kander, also an alumnus of Oberlin. Kander was working on his Ph.D. in music, and the Goldman brothers wrote the libretto for his dissertation. Kander was the composer of more than a dozen musicals, including Cabaret and Chicago, and all three of them eventually won Academy Awards.

On June 25, 1956, Goldman began writing his first novel The Temple of Gold, completing it in less than three weeks. He sent the manuscript to agent Joe McCrindle, who agreed to represent him; McCrindle submitted the novel to Knopf, who agreed to publish it if he doubled the length. It sold well enough in paperback to launch Goldman on his career. He wrote his second novel Your Turn to Curtsy, My Turn to Bow (1958) in a little more than a week. It was followed by Soldier in the Rain (1960), based on Goldman's time in the military. It sold well in paperback and was turned into a film, though Goldman had no involvement in the screenplay.

=== Theater work ===
Goldman and his brother received a grant to do some rewriting on the musical Tenderloin (1960). They then collaborated on their own play, Blood, Sweat and Stanley Poole (1961), and on the musical, A Family Affair (1962), written with John Kander. Both plays had short runs.

Goldman began writing Boys and Girls Together, but found that he suffered writer's block. His writer's block continued, but he had an idea for the novel No Way to Treat a Lady (1964) based on the Boston Strangler. He wrote it in two weeks, and it was published under the pseudonym Harry Longbaugh—a variant spelling of the Sundance Kid's real name, which Goldman had been researching since the late 1950s. He then finished Boys and Girls Together, which became a best seller.

=== Screenwriter ===
Cliff Robertson read an early draft of No Way to Treat a Lady and hired Goldman to adapt the short story Flowers for Algernon for the movies. Before he had even finished the script, Robertson recommended him to do some rewriting on the spy spoof Masquerade (1965), in which Robertson was starring. Goldman did that, then finished the Algernon script. Robertson disliked it, though, and hired Stirling Silliphant, instead, to work on what became Charly (1968).

Producer Elliot Kastner had optioned the film rights to Boys and Girls Together. Goldman suggested that Kastner make a film of the Lew Archer novels of Ross Macdonald and offered to do an adaptation. Kastner agreed, and Goldman chose The Moving Target. The result was Harper (1966) starring Paul Newman, which was a big hit.

=== Butch Cassidy and the Sundance Kid ===
Goldman returned to novels, writing The Thing of It Is... (1967). He taught at Princeton and wished to write something, but he could not come up with an idea for a novel. Instead, he wrote Butch Cassidy and the Sundance Kid, his first original screenplay, which he had been researching for eight years. He sold it for $400,000, the highest price ever paid for an original screenplay at that time. The movie was released in 1969, a critical and commercial success that earned Goldman an Academy Award for Best Original Screenplay. The money enabled Goldman to take some time off and research the nonfiction book The Season: A Candid Look at Broadway (1969).

Goldman adapted Steven Linakis's novel In the Spring the War Ended into a screenplay, but it was not filmed. Neither were scripts of The Thing of It Is, which came close to being made several times in the early '70s, and Papillon, on which he worked for six months and three drafts; the book was filmed, but little of Goldman's work was used. He returned to novels with Father's Day (1971), a sequel to The Thing of It Is.... He also wrote the screenplay for The Hot Rock (1972).

=== The Princess Bride ===
Goldman's next novel was The Princess Bride (1973); he also wrote a screenplay, but it was more than a decade before the film was made. That same year, he contracted a rare strain of pneumonia, which resulted in his being hospitalized and affected his health for months. This inspired him into a burst of creativity, including several novels and screenplays.

Goldman's novel writing moved in a more commercial direction following the death of his editor Hiram Haydn in late 1973. This started with the children's book Wigger (1974), followed by the thriller Marathon Man (1974), which he sold to Delacorte as part of a three-book deal worth $2 million. He sold movie rights to Marathon Man for $450,000.

His second book for Delacorte was the thriller Magic (1976), which he sold to Joe Levine for $1 million. He did the screenplays for the film versions of Marathon Man (1976) and Magic (1978). He also wrote the screenplay for The Stepford Wives (1975), which he says was an unpleasant experience because director Bryan Forbes rewrote most of it; Goldman tried to take his name off it, but they would not let him. He was reunited with director George Roy Hill and star Robert Redford on The Great Waldo Pepper (1975), which Goldman wrote from an idea of Hill.

=== All the President's Men ===
Redford hired Goldman to write the screenplay for All the President's Men (1976). Goldman wrote the famous line "Follow the money"; while the line is often attributed to Deep Throat, it is not found in Bob Woodward's notes nor in Woodward and Carl Bernstein's book or articles. The book does have the far less quotable line from Woodward to Senator Sam Ervin, who was about to begin his own investigation: "The key was the secret campaign cash, and it should all be traced..."

Goldman was unhappy with the film. The Guardian says that he changes the subject when asked about the film, but suggests that his displeasure may be because he was pressured to add a romantic interest to the film. In his memoir, Goldman says of the film that if he could live his life over, he would have written the same screenplays, "Only I wouldn't have come near All the President's Men." He said that he has never written as many versions of a screenplay as he did for that film. Speaking of his choice to write the script, he said: "Many movies that get made are not long on art and are long on commerce. This was a project that seemed it might be both. You don't get many and you can't turn them down."

In Michael Feeney Callan's book Robert Redford: The Biography, Redford is reported as stating that Goldman did not actually write the screenplay for the film, a story that was excerpted in Vanity Fair. Written By magazine conducted a thorough investigation of the screenplay's many drafts and concluded, "Goldman was the sole author of All The President's Men. Period."

=== Joseph E. Levine ===
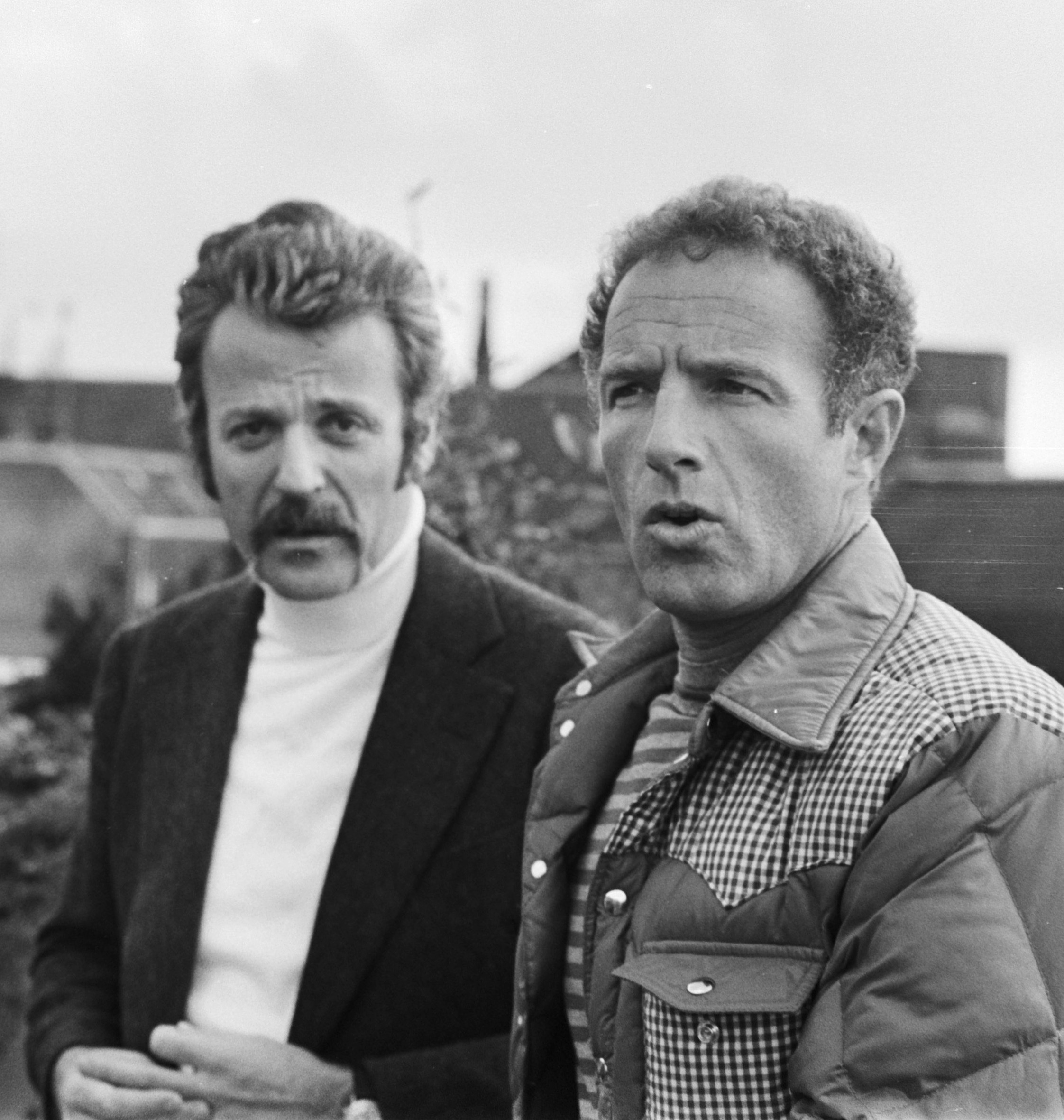
Goldman (left) and James Caan while shooting A Bridge Too Far in 1976

Goldman had a happier experience when hired by Joseph E. Levine to write A Bridge Too Far (1977) based on the book by Cornelius Ryan. Goldman later wrote a promotional book, Story of A Bridge Too Far (1977), as a favor to Levine, and signed a three-film contract with the producer worth $1.5 million.

He wrote a novel about Hollywood, Tinsel (1979), which sold well. He wrote two more films for Levine, The Sea Kings and Year of the Comet, but did not write a third. He did a script about Tom Horn; Mr. Horn (1979), was filmed for TV.

Goldman was the original screenwriter for the film version of Tom Wolfe's novel The Right Stuff; director Philip Kaufman wrote his own screenplay without using Goldman's material, because Kaufman wanted to include Chuck Yeager as a character; Goldman did not.

He wrote a number of other screenplays around this time, including The Ski Bum; a musical adaptation of Grand Hotel (1932) that was going to be directed by Norman Jewison; and Rescue, the story of the rescue of Electronic Data Systems employees during the Iranian Revolution. None were made into films.

=== Adventures in the Screen Trade and the "Leper Period" ===
After several of his screenplays were not filmed, Goldman found himself in less demand as a screenwriter. He published a memoir about his professional life in Hollywood, Adventures in the Screen Trade (1983), which summed up the entertainment industry in the opening sentence of the book, "Nobody knows anything."

He focused on novels: Control (1982), The Silent Gondoliers (1983), The Color of Light (1984), Heat (1985), and Brothers (1986). The last, a sequel to Marathon Man, was Goldman's last published novel.

=== Return to Hollywood ===
Goldman attributed his return to Hollywood to signing with talent agent Michael Ovitz at Creative Artists Agency. He went to work on Memoirs of an Invisible Man, although he left the project relatively early.

Hollywood's interest in Goldman was reawakened; he wrote the scripts for film adaptations of Heat (1986) and The Princess Bride (1987). The latter was directed by Rob Reiner for Castle Rock, which hired Goldman to write the screenplay for Reiner's adaptation of Stephen King's novel Misery, considered "one of [King's] least adaptable novels". The film, for which Kathy Bates received an Academy Award for Best Actress, performed well with critics and at the box office.

Goldman continued to write nonfiction regularly. He published a collection of sports writing, Wait Till Next Year (1988) and an account of his time as a judge at both the Cannes Film Festival and the Miss America Pageant, Hype and Glory (1990).

Goldman began to work steadily as a "script doctor", doing uncredited work on films including Twins (1988), A Few Good Men (1992), Indecent Proposal (1993), Last Action Hero (1993), Malice (1994), Dolores Claiborne (1995), and Extreme Measures. Most of these movies were by Castle Rock.

He was credited on several other movies: Year of the Comet (1992), which was eventually filmed by Castle Rock, but was not a success; the biopic Chaplin (1992), directed by Richard Attenborough; Maverick (1994), a popular hit; The Chamber (1996), from a novel by John Grisham; The Ghost and the Darkness (1996), an original script based on a true story; Absolute Power (1997) for Clint Eastwood; and The General's Daughter (1999), from the novel by Nelson DeMille.

=== Later career ===
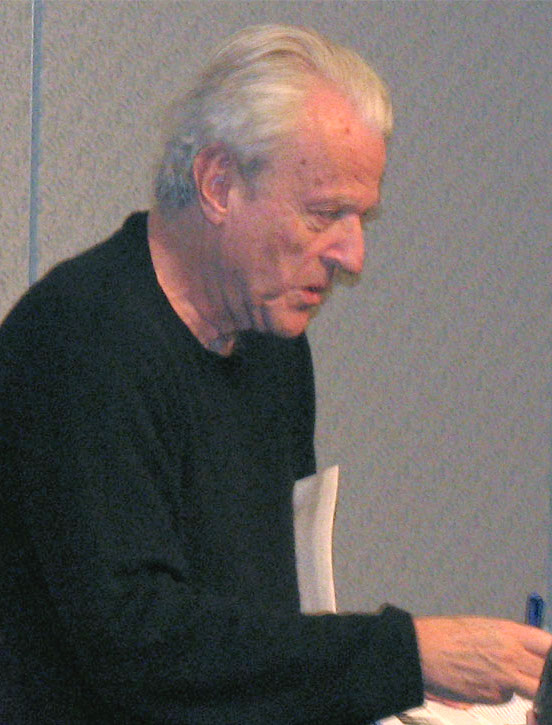
Goldman at the 2008 Screenwriting Expo

Goldman wrote another volume of memoirs, Which Lie Did I Tell? (2000), and a collection of his essays, The Big Picture: Who Killed Hollywood? and Other Essays (2001).

His later screenplay credits include Hearts in Atlantis (2001) and Dreamcatcher (2003), both from novels by Stephen King. He adapted Misery into a stage play, which made its debut on Broadway in 2015 in a production starring Bruce Willis and Laurie Metcalf.

His script for Heat was filmed again as Wild Card (2015), starring Jason Statham.

After his death, screenwriter Peter Morgan wrote that Goldman had completed a final book on Hollywood, comparing the production of three different films, including Morgan's Frost/Nixon, but that the book had run into legal problems and was never published. Writers Tony Gilroy and Scott Frank said Goldman spent considerable time mentoring and advising other writers.

=== Critical reception ===
In their feature on Goldman, IGN said, "It's a testament to just how truly great William Goldman is at his best that I actually had to think hard about what to select as his 'Must-See' cinematic work". The site described his script for All the President's Men as a "model of storytelling clarity... and artful manipulation".

Art Kleiner, writing in 1987, said, "William Goldman, a very skilled storyteller, wrote several of the most well-known films of the past 18 years—including Marathon Man, part of All the President's Men, and Butch Cassidy and the Sundance Kid."

Three of Goldman's scripts have been voted into the Writers Guild of America hall-of-fame's 101 Greatest Screenplays list.

In his book evaluating Goldman's work, William Goldman: The Reluctant Storyteller (2014), Sean Egan said Goldman's achievements were made "without ever lunging for the lowest common denominator. Although his body of work has been consumed by millions, he has never let his populism overwhelm a glittering intelligence and penchant for upending expectation."

=== Self-appraisal ===
In 2000, Goldman said of his writing:

Someone pointed out to me that the most sympathetic characters in my books always died miserably. I didn't consciously know I was doing that. I didn't. I mean, I didn't wake up each morning and think, today I think I'll make a really terrific guy so I can kill him. It just worked out that way. I haven't written a novel in over a decade... and someone very wise suggested that I might have stopped writing novels because my rage was gone. It's possible. All this doesn't mean a helluva lot, except probably there is a reason I was the guy who gave Babe over to Szell in the "Is it safe?" scene and that I was the guy who put Westley into The Machine. I think I have a way with pain. When I come to that kind of sequence I have a certain confidence that I can make it play. Because I come from such a dark corner.

Goldman also said of his work: "I [don't] like my writing. I wrote a movie called Butch Cassidy and the Sundance Kid and I wrote a novel called The Princess Bride and those are the only two things I've ever written, not that I'm proud of, but that I can look at without humiliation."

=== Awards ===
He won two Academy Awards: one for Best Original Screenplay for Butch Cassidy and the Sundance Kid, and Best Adapted Screenplay for All the President's Men. He also won two Edgar Awards, from the Mystery Writers of America, for Best Motion Picture Screenplay: for Harper in 1967, and for Magic (adapted from his 1976 novel) in 1979. In 1985, he received the Laurel Award for Screenwriting Achievement from the Writers Guild of America.

== Personal life ==
He was married to Ilene Jones from 1961 until their divorce in 1991; the couple had two daughters, Jenny Rebecca (b. 1962) and Susanna (b 1965). Ilene, a native of Texas, modeled for Neiman Marcus; Ilene's brother was actor Allen Case.

Goldman was survived by his partner of nineteen years, Susan Burden, his daughter Jenny, and a grandson. His daughter Susanna died on 15 January 2015.

Goldman said that his favorite writers were Miguel de Cervantes, Anton Chekhov, W. Somerset Maugham, Irwin Shaw, and Leo Tolstoy.

He was a die-hard fan of the New York Knicks, having held season tickets at Madison Square Garden for over 40 years. He contributed a writing section to Bill Simmons's bestselling book about the history of the NBA, in which he discussed the career of Dave DeBusschere.

Since his death his collection of personal books is managed by INKQ Rare Books in Addison, Texas.

== Death ==
Goldman died at his Manhattan apartment on November 16, 2018, due to colon cancer complicated by pneumonia. He was 87.

== Works ==
=== Theatre ===
==== Produced ====
- Tenderloin (1960), uncredited doctoring work
- Blood, Sweat and Stanley Poole (1961), with James Goldman
- A Family Affair (1962), lyrics; book was by James Goldman, music by John Kander
- Misery (2012), adapted from the novel Misery

==== Unproduced ====
- Madonna and Child – with James Goldman
- Now I Am Six
- Something Blue – musical
- musical of Boys and Girls Together (aka Magic Town)
- Nagurski – musical
- The Man Who Owned Chicago – musical with James Goldman and John Kander
- musical of The Princess Bride – with Adam Guettel (abandoned after royalty disputes)

=== Screenplays ===
==== Produced ====
Year	Title	Director	Notes
1965	Masquerade	Basil Dearden	
1966	Harper	Jack Smight	
1969	Butch Cassidy and the Sundance Kid	George Roy Hill	Also producer (Uncredited); Academy Award for Best Original Screenplay; BAFTA Award for Best Screenplay; Nominated- Golden Globe Award for Best Screenplay
1972	The Hot Rock	Peter Yates	
1975	The Stepford Wives	Bryan Forbes	
1975	The Great Waldo Pepper	George Roy Hill	
1976	Marathon Man	John Schlesinger	Based on his novel; Nominated- Golden Globe Award for Best Screenplay
1976	All the President's Men	Alan J. Pakula	Academy Award for Best Adapted Screenplay; Nominated- BAFTA Award for Best Screenplay; Nominated- Golden Globe Award for Best Screenplay
1977	A Bridge Too Far	Richard Attenborough	
1978	Magic	Richard Attenborough	Based on his novel
1986	Heat	Dick Richards; Jerry Jameson	Based on his novel
1987	The Princess Bride	Rob Reiner	Based on his novel
1990	Misery	Rob Reiner	
1992	Memoirs of an Invisible Man	John Carpenter	
1992	Year of the Comet	Peter Yates	
1992	Chaplin	Richard Attenborough	
1994	Maverick	Richard Donner	
1996	The Chamber	James Foley	
1996	The Ghost and the Darkness	Stephen Hopkins	
1997	Absolute Power	Clint Eastwood	
1999	The General's Daughter	Simon West	
2001	Hearts in Atlantis	Scott Hicks	
2003	Dreamcatcher	Lawrence Kasdan	
2015	Wild Card	Simon West	Based on his novel

Consultant

- A Few Good Men (1992)
- Malice (1993)
- Dolores Claiborne (1995)
- Extreme Measures (1996)
- Good Will Hunting (1997)

Uncredited

- Twins (1988)
- Indecent Proposal (1993)
- Last Action Hero (1993)
- Fierce Creatures (1997)

==== Unproduced ====
- Flowers for Algernon: Good Old Charley Gordon (1964) – an adaptation of the story Flowers for Algernon done for actor Cliff Robertson – Robertson was unhappy with the version and hired Stirling Silliphant to write what became Charly (1968)
- The Chill (1967) – adaptation of the 1964 Lew Archer novel by Ross Macdonald
- In the Spring the War Ended (1968) – from the novel by Steven Linakis about American deserters in Europe at the end of World War Two. Lawrence Turman was producer and Martin Ritt attached as director but the studio, 20th Century Fox, decided not to make it because they wanted Pentagon co-operation for Patton (1970).
- The Thing of It Is... aka That's Life (1968) – adapted from his novel
- Piano Man – adaptation of his novel Father's Day
- Papillon – adaptation of the novel which was not used
- Grand Hotel (late 1970s/early 1980s) – musical remake of the 1932 MGM film, with Norman Jewison to direct
- The Sea Kings (late 1970s) – a pirate movie about the relationship between Stede Bonnet and Blackbeard, the first of a three-picture deal with Joseph E. Levine – Goldman says he wrote the part of Blackbeard for Sean Connery and at one stage Richard Lester was attached as director – Goldman says Connery and Roger Moore were considered stars, then later Roger and Dudley Moore – however the film was too expensive to make
- The Ski Bum aka Hot Shot (1981) – based on the article "The Ski Bum as an Endangered Species" by Jean Vallely – Goldman says this was never made due to tension between the producer and the studio
- The Right Stuff – adaptation of the Tom Wolfe book that was not used
- Rescue! (1980–81) – story of the rescue of employees of Ross Perot by Arthur D. Simons during the Iranian revolution – Goldman says this foundered when Clint Eastwood, the only suitable star to play Bull Simons, elected to make Firefox
- Flora Quick, Dead or Alive
- The National Pastime
- Singing Out Loud – unproduced musical worked on with Rob Reiner and Stephen Sondheim
- Low Fives (1992) – comedy about an African who plays for a basketball team in a small college, commissioned by Danny DeVito and intended to star John Cleese and DeVito
- Shazam! (c 2003) – adaptation of Captain Marvel comic book
- The Shooter – an adaptation of the Steven Hunter novel Point of Impact that was to have been directed by Lee Tamahori
- Mission: Impossible 2 – script that was not used

=== Television ===
- Mr. Horn (1979)
- City in Fear (1980) – contributed to idea

=== Novels ===
The Thing of It Is series:

1. The Thing of It Is... (1967)
2. Father's Day (1971)

Babe Levy series:

1. Marathon Man (1974)
2. Brothers (1986)

Stand-alones:

- The Temple of Gold (1957)
- Your Turn to Curtsy, My Turn to Bow (1958)
- Soldier in the Rain (1960)
- Boys and Girls Together (1964)
- No Way to Treat a Lady (1964)
- The Princess Bride (1973)
- Magic (1976)
- Tinsel (1979)
- Control (1982)
- The Silent Gondoliers (1983)
- The Color of Light (1984)
- Heat, published in the United Kingdom as Edged Weapons (1985)

=== Children's books ===
- Wigger (New York: Harcourt Brace Jovanovich, 1974)
  An orphan separated from her blanket, Wigger, nearly dies of loneliness until an extraordinary wind from Zurich brings them together again.

=== Short stories ===
- "The Ice Cream Eat", Transatlantic Review Winter 1959
- "Da Vinci", New World Writing no. 17, 1960
- "Till the Right Girls Come Along", Transatlantic Review, Winter 1961
- "Something Blue", Rogue, April 1963, pp. 13–83
- "The Simple Pleasures of the Rich", Transatlantic Review Autumn-Winter 1974

=== Non-fiction ===
- "The Good-Bye Look". The New York Times Book Review. June 1, 1969. p. 1., article
- The Season: A Candid Look at Broadway (1969), guide
- The Story of 'A Bridge Too Far' (1977), guide
- Adventures in the Screen Trade series: (guides)
  1. Adventures in the Screen Trade: A Personal View of Hollywood and Screenwriting (1983)
  2. Which Lie Did I Tell?: More Adventures in the Screen Trade (2000)
- Wait Till Next Year (1988), with Mike Lupica, memoir
- Hype and Glory (1990), memoir
- Four Screenplays (1995), screenplays of Marathon Man, Butch Cassidy and the Sundance Kid, The Princess Bride, and Misery, with an essay on each
- Five Screenplays (1997), screenplays of All the President's Men, Magic, Harper, Maverick, and The Great Waldo Pepper, with an essay on each
- The Big Picture: Who Killed Hollywood? and Other Essays (2001), essays

== Adaptations ==
- Soldier in the Rain (1963), film directed by Ralph Nelson, based on novel Soldier in the Rain
- No Way to Treat a Lady (1968), film directed by Jack Smight, based on novel No Way to Treat a Lady
- Marathon Man (1976), film directed by John Schlesinger, based on novel Marathon Man
- Magic (1978), film directed by Richard Attenborough, based on novel Magic
- Heat (1986), film directed by Dick Richards and Jerry Jameson, based on novel Heat
- The Princess Bride (1987), film directed by Rob Reiner, based on novel The Princess Bride
- The Princess Bride (2012), short film directed by Emma Bradfield and Tyler Harrah, based on novel The Princess Bride
- Wild Card (2015), film directed by Simon West, based on novel Heat
- 5 Minutes (2018), short film directed by Javan Garza, based on novel Magic
- Home Movie: The Princess Bride (2020), miniseries directed by Jason Reitman, based on novel The Princess Bride
