= Magic (novel) =

1976 psychological horror novel by William Goldman

Magic: A Novel
- First edition
- Author: William Goldman
- Cover artist: Richard Huebner
- Language: English
- Publisher: Delacorte Press
- Publication date: August 1976
- Publication place: United States
- Media type: Print (Paperback, Hardcover)
- Pages: 243 pp
- ISBN: 0-440-05159-2
- OCLC: 2415446
- Dewey Decimal: 813/.5/4
- LC Class: PZ4.G635 Mag PS3557.O384

Magic is a psychological horror novel written by William Goldman. It was published in the United States in August 1976 by Delacorte Press. In 1978 Richard Attenborough directed a feature film adaptation of the story that starred Anthony Hopkins and Ann-Margret.

== Plot summary ==
The novel concerns a man named Corky Withers, a shy, odd-tempered and alcoholic magician, whose lackluster performances start to turn around when he adds a foul-mouthed ventriloquist's dummy, Fats, to the show. It chronicles Corky's childhood and adolescence, and his deep love for a high-school crush named Peggy Ann Snow.

The novel is written kaleidoscopically, changing time period, location, and point of view swiftly and leaving important information, such as the identity of Fats the dummy, unknown for extended periods of time.

== Background ==
Goldman had the idea for a novel about a ventriloquist for a number of years before writing it.

He says his editor suggested he cut the sequence where Corky's father talks about seeing Bronko Nagurski making a comeback in a football game, which Goldman had seen as a boy, but the author refused because he was so moved by it.

== Reception ==
Producer Joseph E. Levine paid $1 million for the film rights and to do the screenplay. The novel was well-received.

== Adaptations ==
- Magic (1978), film directed by Richard Attenborough
- 5 Minutes (2018), short film directed by Javan Garza
