= Your Turn to Curtsy, My Turn to Bow =

1958 book by William Goldman

- First edition
- Author: William Goldman
- Language: English
- Published: 1958 (Doubleday)
- Publication place: United States

Your Turn to Curtsy, My Turn to Bow is a 1958 novel from William Goldman.

== Background ==
Goldman wrote the book after a 50-week break following his first novel and finished it in seven days. (Other accounts say ten.)

Goldman says he was inspired by reading a story by Harold Brodkey in the New Yorker called "First Love" and feeling he could write a better love story.

The book was not widely reviewed when it came out but enjoyed more than fourteen publications in paperback since it came out. Goldman:

Doubleday published it because they thought I might make some money for them someday, but the book found a certain cult. It's sold a lot of copies and it's very popular with the kids in the high schools and colleges. It's a very strange thing.

== Adaptation ==
A film version was announced in 1964 but was never made.
