= Control (novel) =

1982 novel by William Goldman

- First edition
- Author: William Goldman
- Language: English
- Publisher: Delacorte Press
- Publication date: 1982
- Publication place: United States
- Pages: 305
- ISBN: 0-440-01471-9

Control is a 1982 novel by William Goldman.

The book was a runner up on The New York Times best seller list.

Although Goldman was a noted screenwriter and many of his novels had been adapted into films there was no interest in adapting Control. Goldman later wrote the novel "was such a neat idea for a movie. I felt sure that somebody would want to make it. It was about trying to control the future by controlling the past. There was never a phone call about Control."
