= The Temple of Gold =

1957 book by William Goldman

- First edition
- Author: William Goldman
- Language: English
- Publisher: Knopf
- Publication date: October 14, 1957
- Publication place: United States
- Pages: 277

The Temple of Gold is a 1957 novel by William Goldman. It was Goldman's first novel, and launched his career.

== Background ==
The novel was written in three weeks over the summer he graduated from college, in June–July 1956. Goldman had never written a novel before, but had several years experience writing short stories, though none had been published.

The title Temple of Gold was taken from the film Gunga Din. Another influence on the book was the novel Bonjour Tristesse. Goldman had recently done military service and met a man who had an agent. He sent the novel to the agent, and through him got representation from Joe McCrindle. McCrindle sent it to Knopf, who accepted it for publication. Goldman said Knopf:

Wanted me to double it in length and I didn't know what to do about that... That's still the most amazing thing I've ever heard any young writer be told. I was able to do it through some kind of madness but, Jesus, it's an insane thing for an editor to say.

Goldman says he has "no idea why" Knopf accepted the novel "but one of the things that happened, there was an interest in publishing books by young writers and I was one of those writers who basically got picked up along with it." Goldman later reflected:

I never would have continued as a writer if The Temple of Gold had not been taken by the first publisher I sent it to. I'm not that masochistic. There was no way I was going to write anymore. I didn't know that then, but I know it now. There was no encouragement; no one ever said I had any talent. I had never written anything much over two pages long. I had done badly in school in terms of writing. I did not want to be a failure, but I did not have the courage to write a second book if the first had not been accepted.

A 2001 Ballantine paperback edition of the novel included as an afterword a first chapter removed by Knopf.

== Reception ==
According to Goldman, "the book, like most of my books, got crucified in hardcover and was a very, very successful book in paperback. Most of the books that I've written had their success in paperback."

== Film adaptation ==
Walt Disney Studios Motion Pictures purchased the film rights to the movie.
