= The Big Picture: Who Killed Hollywood? and Other Essays =

- First edition
- Author: William Goldman
- Language: English
- Genre: non-fiction
- Publisher: Applause Books
- Publication date: 2000
- Publication place: United States

The Big Picture: Who Killed Hollywood? and Other Essays is a collection of writings by William Goldman on the film industry. Many of the pieces had previously been published in magazines such as Premiere. It was published by Applause Books in 2000.

Michael Sragow, reviewing The Big Picture: Who Killed Hollywood? and Other Essays, writes, "Much of his gruff humor and charm derives from emphatic statements of the obvious. In writing about movies, seeing the obvious is an undeniable gift—and pounding it home conveys how difficult it can be for common sense to penetrate hype. Goldman also applies a fine-honed sledgehammer to Good Will Hunting, a movie on which he consulted for one day and insists he likes. He observes that Robin Williams, playing (he chortles) 'the shrink with only one patient,' finds an awesomely simple solution to curing the mental torment of the young genius Matt Damon: he tells the boy, 'It's not your fault,' 10 times. Goldman, like a gleeful prosecutor, repeats the phrase for us 10 times, in italics."
