= Wild Card (2015 film) =

American action film by Simon West

- Theatrical release poster
- Directed by: Simon West
- Screenplay by: William Goldman
- Based on: Heat by William Goldman
- Produced by: Steve Chasman
- Starring: Jason Statham; Michael Angarano; Milo Ventimiglia; Dominik Garcia-Lorido; Anne Heche; Sofia Vergara; Max Casella; Jason Alexander; Hope Davis; Stanley Tucci
- Cinematography: Shelly Johnson
- Edited by: Padraic McKinley
- Music by: Dario Marianelli
- Production companies: Current Entertainment; Quad Films; SJ Pictures; Sierra/Affinity
- Distributed by: Lionsgate
- Release dates: January 14, 2015 (France); January 30, 2015 (United States)
- Running time: 102 minutes
- Country: United States
- Language: English
- Budget: $30 million
- Box office: $6.7 million

Wild Card is a 2015 American action thriller film directed by Simon West and starring Jason Statham, Michael Angarano, Milo Ventimiglia, Dominik Garcia-Lorido, Anne Heche, and Sofia Vergara. Based on the 1985 novel Heat by William Goldman, it is a remake of the 1986 adaptation that starred Burt Reynolds. The film was released in the United States on January 30, 2015 in a limited release and through video on demand.

Wild Card received negative reviews and was a box-office bomb, making only $6.7 million worldwide against a $30 million budget.

== Plot ==
Nick Wild is a recovering gambling addict who takes odd jobs in Las Vegas as a "chaperone" (his version of a bodyguard) to support his addiction. After helping a client impress a woman, he accepts a proposition from a young man, Cyrus Kinnick, to show him around Vegas and provide protection while he gambles.

While eating at a diner, Nick's waitress friend Roxy hands him a message from a woman he knows, Holly, who wants him to stop by her house. Holly, a professional escort, explains she had a date the previous night at the Golden Nugget. Afterward, she was brutally raped and beaten by three unknown men in their hotel room. Holly asks Nick to find out who they are so that she can sue them.

Nick discovers that the man responsible for raping Holly is Danny DeMarco, a gangster, who had two of his thugs dump her in a hospital parking lot. Nick goes to the hotel to confront DeMarco and a confrontation develops, resulting in Nick overpowering DeMarco and his men, who are tied up. Nick calls Holly, who contemplates castrating DeMarco, who then breaks down and begs her forgiveness. Holly decides to just take the $50,000 from DeMarco's desk and leaves.

Holly splits the money with Nick and leaves Las Vegas. Nick takes Cyrus to a casino and whilst playing blackjack with dealer friend Cassandra, Nick goes on a huge winning streak with the next dealer, amassing over a half a million dollars. But when he goes to the cashier, he has a sudden anxiety attack and decides to keep on gambling, eventually losing all his winnings (as well as his original $25,000) on a single blackjack bet with Cassandra. The next morning, Cyrus, revealed to be a self-made millionaire, wants Nick to mentor him on being brave, but Nick declines. At the bar, DeMarco's men arrive to deliver Nick to DeMarco, but Nick fends them off.

Nick meets with Baby, the mafia boss of Las Vegas. Baby has received a complaint from DeMarco, who claims that Nick broke into his hotel room, pistol-whipped him, and killed two of his men – all to fund his gambling addiction. Baby takes Nick to a room with DeMarco, where Nick tells his side of the story: that DeMarco killed his own men, to save face after begging for his life, and that DeMarco bears a cut on his penis. Baby tells DeMarco to drop his pants to prove Nick wrong, but he refuses and leaves.

At the local diner, Cyrus offers Nick a check for $500,000 and a plane ticket to Corsica for what he has learned from Nick. DeMarco and his men appear in the diner. Cyrus shows his newfound manliness by singing loudly as a distraction so Nick can escape to an alley behind the diner. Nick thinks about his sailboat and then kills the thugs and DeMarco with the diner's cutlery.

Afterwards, Cyrus insists Nick take the check and the plane ticket. Nick accepts, then drives out of Las Vegas.

== Cast ==
- Jason Statham as Nick Wild
- Michael Angarano as Cyrus Kinnick
- Milo Ventimiglia as Danny DeMarco
- Dominik Garcia-Lorido as Holly
- Anne Heche as Roxy
- Sofía Vergara as D.D.
- Max Casella as Osgood
- Jason Alexander as Pinchus "Pinky" Zion
- Francois Vincentelli as Benny
- Davenia McFadden as Millicent
- Chris Browning as Tiel
- Matthew Willig as Kinlaw
- Greice Santo as Cocktail Waitress
- Hope Davis as Cassandra
- Stanley Tucci as "Baby"
- Michael Papajohn as Pit Boss
- Lara Grice as First Doctor

== Production ==
Simon West said that Jason Statham developed the project himself "maybe over five years". At one point, Brian De Palma was slated to direct until West replaced him. West stated:

He [Statham] showed it to me once when we were doing Mechanic, but I was off doing something else, but then he showed it to me again after Expendables 2 and I got into it, because of the writing really. William Goldman is a hero of mine ... I actually worked with him on The General's Daughter. He did plot hole work on the script. So this was a chance to work with him on a whole script – not just a polish on a script.

West said the script filmed was the one Goldman wrote over thirty years ago. He later elaborated:

I rang him up and said, "I'm about to put the record straight and fix this film for you." I did ask him, what's your one piece of advice for me when shooting this? He said, "Just make sure that Nick is the toughest guy you've ever seen in your life." That, I think is his approach – no matter how complicated the character is intellectually, no matter how much dialogue there is, or twists and turns Goldman puts in the script, at the end of the day, he has this one thing that he has above his desk that reminds him what the character should be. It was the same for me – once he told me that, "Nick's the toughest guy in Vegas", every scene informs that. Even when he's not doing anything, everybody in the room knows that, and everybody knows his history, what he's capable of. And so he ultimately doesn't have to do that much, because he is the toughest guy in Vegas.

"It was nice firstly to have a script that was so set, because on any big movie scripts are constantly in flux," said West. "It also made it easy to sell to actors like Stanley Tucci and Sofia Vergara because their parts were very set out. There's nothing in the script that's really aged, there's no pyrotechnics or technology really."

=== Filming ===
Filming began in early 2013 in New Orleans, Louisiana. The principal photography began in February 2013.

Simon West said the three fights were "character driven".

each one of the action moments is character-driven, so you're right, it builds up. So when it does explode, it's exploding for the right reason. The first one, he's getting back into his old skills – precision fighting. The only way he's going to get out alive is by relying on his old skills. And he's a master of that. The second fight explodes out of anger, and it's really anger at himself for going back to being a gambling addict. They're character-driven fights. Whereas traditionally in action films, they're light relief – they're almost commercial breaks in the story. These ones come out of the situation his character's in, not just that he's in jeopardy and has to fight his way out of it – they're emotional fights.

== Marketing ==
The trailer for Wild Card debuted on December 12, 2014. West later recalled:

It was a formidable thing, there are pages and pages of dialogue – it's a drama really. It's not an action film really, it's a character piece. Jason [Statham] is the lead in every scene and he has huge dialogue scenes. I knew he was passionate about it, but was like, "Are you happy with all this dialogue stuff?" and he said, "Yes, yes. I love it. I want to do it." So I turned up on the first day not knowing what it was going to turn out like. Especially after The Mechanic where he only has five lines in the whole film! That character has no dialogue. But we turned up on the first day and he knew every word by heart and was amazing. So, Wild Card, I think will surprise a lot of people – it's a very strong dramatic piece by him. There are, of course, also two or three fights! I think some of his best fights ever are in it. They're very realistic and we spent a lot of time on them, so they're very detailed and very well executed I think. But it's a great performance, and he's surrounded by some very cool actors: Stanley Tucci, Anne Heche, Sofia Vergara ... he's in a proper actor's environment and he really stepped up. I was amazed. I think this is just the beginning for him, I think you'll see a lot more dramatic stuff from him.

== Release ==
Lionsgate released the film in a limited release and through on demand on January 30, 2015.

== Reception ==
=== Box office ===
Wild Card was a box office flop, making only $6.7 million against a $30 million budget.

=== Critical response ===
Wild Card has generally received negative reviews from film critics. On Rotten Tomatoes the film has an approval rating of 30% based on reviews from 56 critics, with an average rating of 4.85 out of 10. The site's consensus states: "Hardcore Jason Statham fans may enjoy parts of Wild Card, but all other action aficionados need not apply." On Metacritic the film has a score of 40 out of 100 based on reviews from 19 critics.

Betsy Sharkey of the Los Angeles Times gave the film a negative review, calling Wild Card "predictable". She summed up her review by saying that Wild Card "is no royal flush, no full house, no three of a kind. A bust is I think the term I'm searching for".

== See also ==
- List of films set in Las Vegas
