= Wait Till Next Year =

1988 book by William Goldman

- First edition
- Author: William Goldman; Mike Lupica
- Language: English
- Publisher: Bantam Books
- Publication date: 1988
- Publication place: United States
- Pages: 363
- ISBN: 0-553-05319-1

Wait Till Next Year is a 1988 memoir by sportswriter Mike Lupica and screenwriter William Goldman.

The book is similar to Goldman's earlier effort The Season: A Candid Look at Broadway in that it looks at a year of New York sports teams with Goldman getting press passes to see a huge number of games. The main focus is looking at The Mets following up their championship season while taking in the local Basketball and American Football teams too in a wildly frenetic overview of the coaches, stars, owners, trades and controversies that the season provided.

Lupica and Goldman had been friends for thirty years when Lupica suggested to Goldman they collaborate on a book together, from his point of view and Goldman's point of view. Goldman:

I wanted to be a sports columnist when I was a kid and then I learned more about what they did for a living and I decided I didn't want to do it. You have to go see all that shit. It's fun to go to a ball game occasionally. What was great, the year I did the book with Lupica, was I had press passes so I could go sit with all those people whose columns I read and watch a baseball game or a football game or a basketball game.

Goldman said they would do alternate chapters. "I would eventually show him what I had and he would show me what he had but for the most part, we kept away from each other. We'd talk all the time."

Goldman said the book "was a total flop—it didn't work commercially—but it was a wonderful time for me."
