= Magic (1978 film) =

1978 American supernatural psychological horror film by Richard Attenborough

- Theatrical release poster
- Directed by: Richard Attenborough
- Screenplay by: William Goldman
- Based on: Magic by William Goldman
- Produced by: Joseph E. Levine; Richard P. Levine
- Starring: Anthony Hopkins; Ann-Margret; Burgess Meredith; Ed Lauter
- Cinematography: Victor J. Kemper
- Edited by: John Bloom
- Music by: Jerry Goldsmith
- Production company: Joseph E. Levine Presents
- Distributed by: 20th Century Fox
- Release date: November 8, 1978
- Running time: 107 minutes
- Country: United States
- Language: English
- Budget: $7 million
- Box office: $23.8 million

Magic is a 1978 American psychological horror drama film directed by Richard Attenborough and starring Anthony Hopkins, Ann-Margret and Burgess Meredith. The screenplay is by William Goldman, who adapted his novel of the same title. The score was composed by Jerry Goldsmith.

== Plot ==
After Charles "Corky" Withers fails in his first attempt at professional magic, his mentor Merlin says that he needs a better gimmick. Corky comes back as a combination magician and ventriloquist with a foul-mouthed dummy named Fats, becoming a huge success. Corky's agent, Ben Greene, is on the verge of signing him for his own television show, but Corky bails for the Catskills, where he grew up, since he does not want to take the TV network's medical examination because the doctors might find out that he suffers from severe mental issues and cannot control Fats (who is a manifestation of Corky's id).

In the Catskills, Corky reunites with his high-school crush, Peggy Ann Snow, who is stuck in a passionless marriage with Duke, Corky's friend from high school. A magic trick with a deck of cards charms Peggy into thinking they are soulmates, and the pair have sex. This sparks jealousy in both Duke and Fats.

In the midst of an argument "between" Corky and Fats, Greene confronts Corky, discovering the truth about his state of mind. Greene leaves to contact doctors, but Fats convinces Corky to kill him. Corky bludgeons Greene with Fats' wooden head and then drowns him.

The next morning, Corky says that he plans to elope with Peggy and leave the dummy behind. Suspecting his wife has cheated on him, Duke talks with Corky by the lake and confides that he loves Peggy and is worried about losing her. Duke suddenly spots the unconscious body of a man on the edge of the lake and goes to check him for an ID. Believing he could still be alive, Corky is sent to get help while Duke administers the "kiss of life".

Curious, Duke searches Corky's cabin. He discovers that the drowned man was Corky's agent, Greene, and is stabbed to death by Fats with "help" from Corky.

Corky composes himself and persuades Peggy to run away with him, but she insists on waiting to tell Duke. Fats then "comes alive" and reveals that Corky's card trick is a ruse he uses to seduce women. Peggy sees it as Corky humiliating her and rejects him, locking herself in her bedroom. Fats orders Corky to kill Peggy.

Corky, using Fats' voice, apologizes to Peggy through her locked door and leaves her a wooden heart that he carved. A short while later, he returns with a bloodstained knife. Fats seems pleased until he learns that Corky fatally stabbed himself to prevent further murders by Fats. Corky and Fats each feel faint, wondering which of them will die first. Moments later, Peggy returns to the cabin, happily calling out that she has changed her mind and decided to run away with Corky. As she speaks, she playfully changes her voice to impersonate Fats, tossing the wooden heart in the air.

== Cast ==
- Anthony Hopkins as Corky Withers
  - Also as the voice of Fats
- Ann-Margret as Peggy Ann Snow
- Burgess Meredith as Ben Greene
- Ed Lauter as Duke
- E. J. André as Merlin
- Jerry Houser as Taxi Driver
- David Ogden Stiers as Todson
- Lillian Randolph as Sadie

== Production ==
=== Development ===
In March 1976, Joseph E. Levine had purchased the film rights to Goldman's novel for $1 million, with Goldman hired to write the screenplay. The two men had just collaborated on the film of A Bridge Too Far, directed by Richard Attenborough. Attenborough later said "Joe really financed Magic because he was so impressed by Bill Goldman". Goldman later rejected criticism his story plagiarised the ventriloquist segment in the British movie Dead of Night:

That’s one of those asshole critic things. Dead of Night suffered from being compared to the von Stroheim movie The Great Gabbo. The story in Dead of Night was 14 minutes in an anthology movie... I love Dead of Night but I certainly didn’t say: “Oh boy, let’s rip off this story because it was such a fabulously successful 14 minutes that everybody talks about.

By June 1976, it was announced Norman Jewison had been hired to direct the film. Jewison wanted Jack Nicholson to star, but Nicholson turned it down, claiming he did not want to wear a hairpiece. Goldman later said he did the first two drafts of the script for Jewison but then "Jewison and Levine had an argument and I don’t know what it was about."

Steven Spielberg expressed interest in directing the film and considered casting Robert De Niro for Corky. However the job of directing went to Richard Attenborough, who had directed A Bridge Too Far with Goldman and Levine. Spielberg later wrote, "I really wanted to direct the movie ... I had it in my mind how I would have made that film, and I thought it would have been pretty good." Goldman said, "I don’t know whether Joe [Levine] provoked the argument because Dickie [Richard Attenborough] was unavailable or not but I do know that Levine was crazy about Attenborough at this point. Dickie took very good care of Joe - he knew how to stroke his ego. Levine could be very cranky, but he liked being around Dickie because he would basically make him feel involved in the process." Goldman added that he was "thrilled" Attenborough became involved "because I had enjoyed working with him so much on A Bridge Too Far" although he acknowledged Magic "as none of that liberal admiration at play that Dickie needs when he is inflamed and when he is at his best. Neither did A Chorus Line, there are no causes in either movie and in almost all of his work that is the thing which drives his motor."

Attenborough claimed that Levine persuaded him to make Magic by promising that the producer would then finance the director's dream project, Gandhi. However after Magic was made, Levine said he had changed his mind and Attenborough had to pay the producer $2 million and a percentage of the profits to get the rights back. "It is the only time in my career that I have been double crossed," said Attenborough. Goldman later said, "my guess is that if he had been able to get Gandhi off the ground at that time then he wouldn’t have made Magic."

=== Casting ===
Attenborough gave the lead role to Anthony Hopkins, with whom he had worked on Young Winston and A Bridge Too Far, and was hoping to cast as Gandhi in a proposed biopic. The director later said, "I think for me the attraction of Magic was Tony Hopkins. It was always Tony and I think really that I did the picture for him."

Laurence Olivier was offered the role of the agent but was unable to do it, and then Burgess Meredith was cast. Meredith landed the role after walking into the 21 Club one night when Levine was there – Levine cast him on the spot. Meredith modelled his performance on the agent Swifty Lazar, even shaving his head to look like Lazar. "I tried to get his cool, understated manner, his sharp clothes, and most of all, his way of speaking softly so that you've got to lean over to hear what he's saying", said Meredith.

Ann-Margret was given the female lead. Goldman later wrote about the film that "Burgess Meredith was perfect and Tony Hopkins...was so wonderful here. But running stride for stride with him was Miss Olsson. I think Ann-Margret is the least appreciated emotional actress anywhere." He elaborated that the film, "looked just as I had imagined it. Especially Peggy. If you’re in America then cheerleaders are a special part of your life and in my head I had always imagined Peggy as a cheerleader. Ann-Margret is everybody’s dream and I thought she was just wonderful. I thought Tony Hopkins was great too. I like the movie."

Ann-Margret and Anthony Hopkins were each paid around $300,000 for their performances.

=== Filming ===
Exteriors were shot in Ukiah, California. Most of the exterior shots were shot at Le Trianon resort on the Blue Lake in Upper Lake, California.

Attenborough recalled, "There were none of the logistical difficulties of A Bridge Too Far involved in shooting Magic but that's not to say that it wasn't without its own unique difficulties. I remember, for example, that we had the worst period of rain that anyone had ever encountered in the Catskills, where we were shooting. The long-range forecast was so bad that there was no alternative but to go ahead so we shot everything in the rain. That meant we had to change the film stock we were using but we got it done."

Ann-Margret said making the movie was "a wonderful experience for me" and Attenborough "was so gentle and he always found the right things to say." Hopkins said he was "very conscious that an American actor should have been playing the part. I thought I had been pretty foolish to accept it in the first place. I was very scared of the accent and all that... But I ended up being able to cope because Dickie went out of his way to make me feel at ease."

== Music ==
The score was composed and conducted by Jerry Goldsmith. The complete soundtrack was released on CD through Varèse Sarabande in April 2003 and features 22 tracks score at a running time of 42 minutes. It was subsequently reissued by La-La Land Records.

== Home media ==
Because Disney via 20th Century Studios never owned complete rights to this film, other companies (especially Embassy and, most recently, Blue Underground) have been able to release home video versions of Magic under different licenses. However, legal complications kept the film from being formally reissued on VHS and DVD in the last decade due in part to Embassy Pictures' corporate holdings being split among different entities. Recently, the rights were acquired by the American Movie Classics division of AMC Film Holdings, LLC, and the TV rights are handled for syndication by Trifecta Entertainment & Media (under Paramount Television Studios). An unedited version is available on widescreen DVD and Blu-ray.

== Reception ==
=== Box office ===
According to Goldman, "The movie was successful and money was made. It was not a huge hit but it was a commercial success in America."

Steven Spielberg, who had wanted to direct Magic, went to see it in cinemas and "realized that it was a hell of a lot better than what I would have done."

=== Critical ===
Gene Siskel of the Chicago Tribune gave the film a complete four-star review, explaining it was because "[the film] scared me, because I admired Hopkins' performance as much as any in this year, and because it would have been so easy for a film such as this to fail." He later ranked it at number 9 on his list of the 10 best films of 1978. On the syndicated film review program Sneak Previews, Roger Ebert admired Hopkins' and Burgess Meredith's performances, and Attenborough's direction but expressed disappointment at the final act, stating "I don't think the screenplay does justice to the talent of the people who get into the picture."

Vincent Canby of The New York Times wrote that "Magic is neither eerie nor effective. It is, however, very heavy of hand." He praised Hopkins' performance, but criticized the screenplay for spending "too much time on irrelevant details, including flashbacks and jumps forward that neither inform nor amuse but simply look trendy in the dated fashion of that word." Similarly, Dale Pollock of Variety wrote: "The dilemma of 'Magic' is that the results never live up to the standards established in the film's opening half-hour. Through flashbacks and claustrophobic editing by John Booth, the relationship between Hopkins and his eerily-realistic dummy, Fats, is well-documented. So is the introduction of Burgess Meredith, well cast as a Swifty Lazar-type of superagent ...It's this stereotyped plotting and conclusion that robs 'Magic' of its initial, special quality". Judith Martin, reviewing for The Washington Post, ended her review, writing "the thrills of a conventional horror story have been blown up so pretentiously that they're no more scary than balloon monsters."

However, The Science Fiction, Horror and Fantasy Film Review 1990 writeup of the film remarks that Hopkins appears stiff in the lead role, but praised the supporting cast: "Ann-Margret...invests her role with a considerable sparkle. Particularly good is the great and underrated Burgess Meredith whose sharp and alert Hollywood agent is a real plum of a performance. Jerry Goldsmith also adds a fine nervy carnivalesque score." The review aggregator website Rotten Tomatoes reports that 87% of 23 critics gave the film a positive review, with an average rating of 6.8/10. The site's consensus reads: "Thanks in large part to Anthony Hopkins' layered performance, Magic is an unusual albeit creepily effective experience". On Metacritic, the film has a weighted average score of 49 out of 100 based on 10 critics, indicating "mixed or average reviews".

Richard Attenborough later said:

I think Magic is a better film than it is given credit for. The majority of the critics quite wrongly and without bothering even to look at it compared it to Dead of Night... But Dead of Night is a totally different story... Michael's performance and Tony's performance they are vastly dissimilar, not because Michael was not good but because it was all on one level whereas what Tony had to do was extraordinary. And being an actor I thought that the opportunity the part presented for an actor was wonderful. Ann-Margret was also cast against type to a certain extent.

== Awards and nominations ==
Goldman received a 1979 Edgar Award, from the Mystery Writers of America, for Best Motion Picture Screenplay. Hopkins received both Golden Globe and BAFTA nominations for his role as the tragically disturbed Corky. Meredith received the Saturn Award for Best Supporting Actor.

== Remake ==
In September 2025, Sam Raimi and Roy Lee were announced to be producing a remake of the film for Lionsgate. The script will be written by Mark Swift and Damian Shannon. In May 2026, Raimi was confirmed to direct it.

== See also ==
Madness resulting from one person living two personas through a ventriloquist's dummy has been portrayed several times before and after, in film and television, most notably:

- The Great Gabbo, a 1929 film
- Dead of Night, a 1945 British film
- Knock on Wood, a 1954 film
- "The Dummy", a 1962 episode of The Twilight Zone
- "Caesar and Me", a 1964 episode of The Twilight Zone
- Devil Doll, a 1964 film
- "Read My Lips", a 1993 episode of Batman: The Animated Series, features a villain called the Ventriloquist, who leads a group of criminals through the persona of his dummy Scarface.
- Generation 13 is a 1995 concept album by Saga partly influenced by Magic.
- "The Puppet Show", a 1997 episode of Buffy the Vampire Slayer.
- "Conky", a 2004 episode of Trailer Park Boys

== Bibliography ==
- Dougan, Andy (1994). The actors' director : Richard Attenborough behind the camera. Mainstream Pub.
- Goldman, William (2000). Five Screenplays with Essays. Applause. ISBN 978-1-55783-362-4.
