= The Color of Light =

1984 novel by William Goldman

- First edition
- Author: William Goldman
- Language: English
- Publisher: Warner Books
- Publication date: 1984
- Publication place: United States
- Pages: 355
- ISBN: 0-446-51274-5

The Color of Light is a novel by William Goldman, published in 1984. It is about the life of writer Charles 'Chub' Fuller, who while attending Oberlin College from 1968 to 1972 channels his childhood experiences as the only child of an alcoholic, suicidal father and a moody, impossible-to-please mother into a series of short stories, shared only with his friend and foil Stanley 'Two-Brew' Kitchel.

The book was one of Goldman's most autobiographical novels.

== Plot ==
The first time Chub gets the impulse to write, he has witnessed a fight between the girl of his dreams, B.J. Peacock, and her boyfriend Del that centers on a man knowing he'll never be able to make his woman happy, but that he'll never be able not to try. Two-Brew is a harsh critic, but feels Chub has the gift—his highest praise for anything Chub has written are four words: "on to the next"—implying that he wants to read more of Chub's work. Two-Brew's father runs Sutton Press in New York, and Chub's first long-awaited visit to New York City is punctuated with the surprise that Two-Brew's father has agreed to publish Chub's first short story.

Chub's writing continues, usually after a collision of an emotional experience in his daily life with a childhood memory, and results in a series of short stories. Over one Christmas break, he visits his mother to surprise her with his published short story, but she sees herself portrayed negatively and explodes, revealing a dark family secret. Chub leaves almost as soon as he arrives, and returns to the Oberlin dorm with weeks of Christmas break ahead of him and nothing to do but write. He births a long story about his father's rise, fall and suicide—the best story he's written, Chub thinks—but Two-Brew insists that it's wrong for a short story and should be a novel. Chub's writing continues, but his focus on his studies suffers, and he graduates jobless. He works at a bar the summer after graduation when Two-Brew, now a young executive in his father's publishing house, suggests Chub connect his short stories and pitch them as a book, as a prelude to the novel about his father. Chub agrees immediately, but Two-Brew has already made the pitch. He hands Chub an envelope with two advance checks, and Chub moves to New York to write his novel.

The book of short stories is published as Under the Weather, and is a modest hit. While Chub enjoys the praise, his walkup flat and New York life in general, he simply isn't writing. He is distracted by illness, and the return of B.J. Peacock into his life, now divorced with a young daughter Jesse, and aware that she inspired Chub's first story. They fall in love, marry and Chub is blissfully happy as both husband and father. However, B.J.'s jealousy extends to his relationship with Jesse, and during a Hawaii trip designed to recapture their happiness, Jesse is drowned by a rogue wave while in Chub's care, which leads to divorce, and a long, dark period for Chub. He teaches at his old school and is terrorized by a student he reported for plagiarism.

Years pass. Chub lives in New York doing research for other writers, paralyzed by the incandescent emotion of his father's suicide, Jesse's death and his divorce. At a party for Two-Brew celebrating his ascension to head of the publishing company, he meets Bonita Kraus ("The Bone"), a tall, intense ex-model with aspirations of writing in the genre of Trash. Two wounded people, they share intimacy of a sort, but only when Sandy Smith, a nubile young fan of Under the Weather shows up at Chub's doorstep and stays does he feel the urge to love and write again. However, she sought him out because another man told her he was "Charley Fuller" the writer of Under the Weather. Sandy falls to her death from his window while Chub is gone, and while the police seem convinced it was suicide, Chub investigates his former student, now an escaped mental patient, then the man posing as Charley Fuller. His efforts to untangle the case make his writer's impulse run even more strongly, and he works up an outline of the story, shows it to Two-Brew and gets the cherished "On to the next" reaction. Finally back on the right path, Chub seeks out The Bone, wanting to move in with her so they both can write and support each other, but upon telling his story, The Bone unconsciously lets slip a detail linking her with Sandy's murder. Chub, terrified, can only repeat to himself that this is excellent material. He just has to live long enough to know how to use it.

== Reception ==
The book received some poor reviews.

== Notes ==
- Egan, Sean, William Goldman: The Reluctant Storyteller, Bear Manor Media 2014
