= Wigger (novel) =

Book by William Goldman

- First edition
- Author: William Goldman
- Illustrator: Errol Le Cain
- Language: English
- Publisher: Harcourt Brace
- Publication date: 1974
- Publication place: United States

Wigger is a 1974 novel written by William Goldman about a young girl who loses her blanket. The book was named for a blanket that belonged to Goldman's daughter Susanna. Goldman later said the novel was one of his favourite works, and that writing it was a "wonderful experience... compared to what it's like ordinarily." The book was voted a Book of the Year by the Child Study Association, however, Goldman, who died in 2018, never wrote another children's book. Wigger has since fallen out of print and is considered rare to book collectors; this was in part due to the book's title (in American slang, a "wigger" is a white person who appropriates and emulates African-American behaviour; the word, which came from the term "white nigger", is considered extremely offensive). The book is also tied up in rights revision issues, like most of Goldman's early published works, since his death.

== Plot ==
Susanna, a little girl, loses both of her parents in a car accident, and after abandonment and neglect by all of her blood relatives, the child is placed in an orphanage known as "The Home". Destitute and hopeless, Susanna finds solace in her blanket, named Wigger; Wigger is sentient to Susanna, and uses playful banter to make her feel better about her own circumstances. When Wigger goes missing, Susanna longs to find the blanket again, sparking an adventure.
