= Hype and Glory =

1990 memoir by William Goldman

- First edition
- Author: William Goldman
- Language: English
- Publisher: Villard
- Publication date: 1990
- Publication place: United States
- Pages: 306pp
- ISBN: 0-394-58432-5

Hype and Glory is a 1990 memoir from William Goldman which details his experiences as a jury member for the main competition section at the 1988 Cannes Film Festival and Miss America Pageant. The book includes an interview with Clint Eastwood and a profile on Robert Redford. Much of the book contains autobiographical material from Goldman, including accounts of his recent divorce.

Goldman later recalled:

I didn't know that I was going to write the damn thing. My wife had left me. I got the Cannes Film Festival invitation while we were still together and then she left and Rob Reiner said, 'I am on a personal campaign to get you accepted on the Miss America Contest'. I began keeping notes because I thought it was something that could be an interesting little book... No, it was not my attempt to woo back my wife. She was wonderful and we're still friends and talk all the time. Nobody in my family ever said, 'God, how could you have trivialised your divorce or your marriage by writing that book?'

Looking back on the book twenty years later Goldman reflected that Miss America contest no longer had the same appeal for people. "I'm stunned at the fact that the Miss America contest has disappeared as a piece of popular culture. It just shocks me."
