= Heat (1986 film) =

1986 film by Dick Richards, Jerry Jameson

- Theatrical release poster
- Directed by: Dick Richards; Jerry Jameson
- Screenplay by: William Goldman
- Based on: Heat by William Goldman
- Produced by: Elliott Kastner; Cassian Elwes
- Starring: Burt Reynolds; Karen Young; Peter MacNicol; Neill Barry; Howard Hesseman; Diana Scarwid
- Cinematography: James A. Contner
- Edited by: Jeffrey Wolf
- Music by: Michael Gibbs
- Distributed by: New Century Vista Film Company
- Release date: November 12, 1986
- Running time: 101 minutes
- Country: United States
- Language: English
- Budget: $12 million
- Box office: $2,793,214

Heat is a 1986 American neo-noir dramatic action thriller film about an ex-mercenary working as a bodyguard in Las Vegas. The film was written by William Goldman, based on his 1985 novel of the same name. Heat was directed by Dick Richards and Jerry Jameson. The film stars Burt Reynolds, Karen Young, Peter MacNicol, Howard Hesseman, Neill Barry and Joseph Mascolo.

== Plot ==
D.D. is in a Las Vegas bar waiting on her milquetoast date, Osgood. Shortly before Osgood arrives, a tough-looking drunk flirts with her, then turns mean. After Osgood arrvies, Osgood beats him and makes him apologize. It turns out that the drunk is Nick Escalante, who had been hired to make Osgood look good.

Nick is a former soldier of fortune, lethal with his hands and an expert with sharp objects. He advertises as a "chaperone", but is actually a bodyguard for hire. Nick's goal is to make enough money to move to Venice, Italy.

He is approached by another meek young man by the name of Cyrus Kinnick. Cyrus Kinnick is wealthy and claims to want someone by his side while he gambles, but what he really wants is for Nick to teach him how to be tough.

Nick is upset when his prostitute friend, Holly, is sadistically beaten while on a "date" with Vegas high roller Danny DeMarco, who has organized crime connections. Nick agrees to help her get revenge. He uses his friendship with a local crime boss, Baby, to get access to DeMarco's hotel suite. When he asks DeMarco about Holly's suffering, DeMarco tells him that it was just a great game. When Nick requests financial restitution for Holly's injuries, DeMarco offers $20,000, but pulls a gun as Nick reaches for the cash. DeMarco orders his huge thugs, Kinlaw and Tiel, to finish Nick, but Nick proceeds to use available sharp objects, including a medallion and the razor-sharp edge of a credit card, to defeat them.

Holly arrives at DeMarco's suite and, finding him tied up, cuts the top of his penis, mocking it as small. DeMarco tries to blame Holly's treatment on his henchmen, but Kinlaw retorts that the henchmen did not get a turn until DeMarco was done with her. Nick gives her the $20,000 and refuses Holly's offer of half the money, so she gives $10,000 to a man and asks him to give the money to Nick after she leaves Vegas.

Nick takes a liking to Kinnick, hanging out with him and giving him pointers on how to defend himself. With the money from Holly, Nick plays blackjack in a casino where his friend Cassie is a dealer. Kinnick comes to realize that the reason Nick has had so much difficulty leaving Vegas is because he is a compulsive gambler. After he wins enough money to go to Venice as planned, Nick decides it is not yet enough to retire on, returns to the casino and proceeds to lose it all.

DeMarco goes to Baby, asking permission to kill Nick, reporting that Kinlaw and Tiel are dead and lying that Nick killed them with their own guns. Baby agrees to mediate a meeting in his home. Nick tells Baby that some parts of DeMarco's story are true, but asks why he would kill with a gun. DeMarco considers it a stupid question, but Baby acknowledges that Nick never uses firearms. Nick then asks how he knows that DeMarco has a small cut on his penis. Baby says that DeMarco will have to expose his penis to prove if Nick is right. DeMarco refuses, after which Baby concludes that DeMarco killed his own thugs, to set up Nick.

DeMarco defies Baby's orders not to kill Nick. He brings more thugs to kill Nick. They find Nick at his office talking to Kinnick. Nick kills the thugs, aided by a brave intervention by Kinnick, who steps into the path of a bullet and is seriously injured. After a long chase during which Nick kills all the hired thugs, a terrified DeMarco flees back to his suite, only to find the power is off and Nick sitting somewhere in the darkness. Nick tells him that what happened to Kinlaw and Tiel is nothing compared to how Nick is now going to kill him. DeMarco shoots blindly in the dark until Nick taunts him that he now has only one bullet left. When Nick details the torture that will follow if DeMarco misses again, DeMarco kills himself.

Multiple cuts of the movie exist. In one, Nick is shown inspecting DeMarco's body and then the film cuts to Nick alone, enjoying a sunny day in the back of a gondola in Venice. In another, Kinnick is first shown to have survived and to be recovering in a hospital.

== Cast ==
- Burt Reynolds as Nick "Mex" Escalante
- Karen Young as Holly
- Peter MacNicol as Cyrus Kinnick
- Howard Hesseman as Pinchus Zion
- Neill Barry as Danny DeMarco
- Joseph Mascolo as "Baby"
- Diana Scarwid as Cassie
- Deborah Rush as D.D.
- Wendell Burton as Osgood
- Joe Klecko as Kinlaw
- Pete Koch as Tiel

== Production ==
In 2000, William Goldman published his second volume of memoirs, Which Lie Did I Tell?: More Adventures in the Screen Trade. He mentioned Heat briefly, saying "the reason you will not learn more about this baby in these pages is simple: to my knowledge, lawsuits are still flying." He added that it was "One of my major disasters...", with a record six directors, who "... toiled on what was only a thirty-six-day shoot." In 2014, he reflected, "We had troubles, what can I tell you?"

=== Development ===
Burt Reynolds was paid $2 million ($5.9 million today) to play the lead role. In 1987, he discussed how "I don't think Heat and Malone", another film he made shortly after, "are the movies that are going to change my career." He added "at least they are serious films which people have told me I should have been doing for years. I don't know how good they are, but at least I'm taking the advice now of close friends and doing films that take me out of a car."

Reynolds apparently initiated the project, having read the novel and calling Goldman about turning it into a film.

=== Robert Altman ===
In February 1986 it was announced Robert Altman was to direct. This was considered a surprising choice; although Altman had previously made The Long Goodbye with producer Elliot Kastner, the two men had a major falling out when Altman was going to direct 92 in the Shade. But Carol Burnett encouraged Altman to work with Burt Reynolds and the director liked the star, so he accepted. According to Altman's biographer Patrick McGilligan, the director "detested the commerciality of William Goldman's script." Altman flew to New York, met with Goldman, and surprised himself by getting along with him, but the writer did not want to change the script. Altman flew to Las Vegas and used a technicality to get out of making the movie—his desired cinematographer, Pierre Mignot, could not obtain the necessary permits to work on the film, so Altman withdrew.

He left the film shortly afterwards. He was replaced by Dick Richards, with whom Kastner had made Farewell, My Lovely.

=== Shooting ===
Richards did not get along with Reynolds. At one stage Reynolds hit Richards and the director left the project, being replaced by Jerry Jameson. Richards later returned, only to fall from a camera crane and wind up in the hospital.

Richards later took credit as 'R.M. Richards' and distanced himself from the final product. "I had nothing to do with the editing of the film," he said later. "I was one of five directors. All I did was the casting and 13 days of shooting... I should have taken my name off it entirely." A Directors Guild of America arbitration ruled that Richards was responsible for 41% of the finished film and Jerry Jameson 31%.

Richards later tried to sue Reynolds for $25 million for the assault, and Reynolds was ordered to pay $500,000 in damages, bitterly remarking in a 1996 interview, "I spent $500,000 for that punch", adding, with reference to other producers and directors he had accosted, including Joel Silver, "If I hit a guy, it's certain that he will (later) run a studio or become a huge director."

Lionel Wigram, who went on to become the senior vice president at Warner Bros. who brought that studio into the multi-billion dollar success of the Harry Potter film series, had one of his first industry jobs as an assistant on Heat.

Joe Klecko and Pete Koch, who play DeMarco's huge goons, were both defensive linemen in the National Football League at the time the movie was filmed.

== Reception ==
Heat grossed $2,793,214 in the United States.

=== Critical response ===
The film earned negative reviews from critics during its release and was not a success at the box office, grossing less than $3 million in ticket sales.

Roger Ebert gave the film two stars out of four and stated, "The screenplay for Heat was written by William Goldman, one of Hollywood's top craftsmen, but he hasn't outdone himself this time. It's all recycled material from other movies - all except for some nice personal touches added by the actors. They bring style to a movie that needs it." Walter Goodman of The New York Times wrote in his review: "SO you think Charles Bronson is the most lethal object on two feet? That's because you haven't seen Heat". Variety called the film a "lukewarm actioner" and "a muddled, violent, and sadly, humorless experience," with a tone that "alternates between a sad portrayal of a lonely, bitter man and a slice-'em-up crime story involving the underbelly of Vegas where police never figure in." Gene Siskel of the Chicago Tribune gave the film one-and-a-half stars out of four and called it "a pale imitation of 'The Karate Kid' with Burt as the master instructor." Patrick Goldstein of the Los Angeles Times wrote, "Unfortunately, except for a couple of bright patches of dialogue by screenwriter William Goldman and a sharp performance by Peter MacNicol, this new Reynolds vehicle never builds up heat—or momentum," adding " "if Reynolds keeps making clunkers like 'Heat' ... no one's going to wonder what happened to his career. No one's going to care."

Filmink magazine argued "Maybe William Goldman’s script for Heat was insurmountable, but I don’t think that’s the case. It just wasn’t director proof."

== Release ==
Heat was released in theatres on November 12, 1986, in France, and on March 13, 1987, in the United States.

The film was released on DVD on March 4, 2003, by Echo Bridge Home Entertainment.

== Legacy ==
Altman's relationship with Kastner inspired a line in The Player directed by Robert Altman. There is a scene where the movie executive Larry Levy (played by Peter Gallagher) passes Burt Reynolds (playing himself) at a restaurant and says "I hope there are no hard feelings. I was only working for Kastner at the time." Kastner said that was Altman "getting back at me, but I enjoyed it very much. I found it amusing."

== Remake ==
Jason Statham starred in a remake written by Goldman and directed by Simon West. Filming took place in United States in early 2013 and the film was released briefly in select theaters in December 2014. The film was released on DVD and Blu-ray on March 31, 2015, by Lionsgate Home Entertainment.
