= Blood, Sweat and Stanley Poole =

1961 play written by James and William Goldman

- Written by: William Goldman; James Goldman
- Original language: English
- Subject: military
- Genre: Drama
- Setting: army post in southern USA

Premiere
- Date premiered: 5 October 1961
- Place premiered: Morosco Theatre, New York

Blood, Sweat and Stanley Poole is a 1961 play by American brothers and playwrights James Goldman and William Goldman near the beginning of their careers. Both had served in the army in the 1950s. The comedy is about a supply sergeant at an army post in the South.

William Goldman later recalled "we had both been in the army at the same time and it seemed like a decent enough idea and magically we got it on."

== Background ==
Brothers James and William Goldman had been permitted to serve together in the Army in 1955. They were stationed with the 101st Airborne division.

The Goldman brothers had received a grant from the Ford Foundation to observe production of the musical Tenderloin. They also wrote a musical together A Family Affair. William Goldman had written a novel about service in the army, Soldier in the Rain. He denied that there were any other similarities between that and Blood, Sweat and Stanley Poole. "The only connection between the two", he said, "is that I was involved in writing both."

Roger Stevens and Joseph Fields optioned the play.

== Original production ==
The original production starred Peter Fonda and Darren McGavin and was directed by Jerome Chodorov. It ran for 84 performances. James Caan appeared in the cast.

The production was budgeted for $100,000 and was brought in at $85,000. The show was launched with "two-for" tickets at certain matinees.

It was the New York stage debut of Peter Fonda, who was selected over 200 other actors. Fonda was originally rejected for the role, the producers saying they wanted someone closer to Robert Morse. However a number of months later he was called back to audition again and was given the part. James Caan was his understudy.

Screen rights were sold to the America Corporation for $125,000, with a ceiling of $125,000. They also invested $45,000 in the production.

== Reception ==
Variety said "There is definite merit to this production. It spouts humorous lines within comical situations, and the dialog and action are in competent hands. The theme is offbeat, replete with both. laugh and human interest potentials. But it’s going to require a bit of blood, sweat and know-how. to meld into hit proportions the many talents on tap."

Howard Taubman of the New York Times did not like the play, saying "the plot is spaced out as mechanically as if it were to run forever on the home screen."

Fonda's performance earned him a New York Drama Critics' Circle Award.

The production transferred to Los Angeles. The Los Angeles Times called it "a routine service comedy."
