= Charly (1968 film) =

1968 film by Ralph Nelson

- Theatrical release poster
- Directed by: Ralph Nelson
- Screenplay by: Stirling Silliphant
- Based on: Flowers for Algernon by Daniel Keyes
- Produced by: Ralph Nelson
- Starring: Cliff Robertson; Claire Bloom; Leon Janney; Lilia Skala; Dick Van Patten
- Cinematography: Arthur J. Ornitz
- Edited by: Fredric Steinkamp
- Music by: Ravi Shankar
- Production companies: ABC Pictures; Robertson and Associates; Selmur Productions
- Distributed by: Cinerama Releasing Corporation
- Release dates: June 28, 1968 (Berlin Film Festival); September 23, 1968 (New York City)
- Running time: 106 minutes
- Country: United States
- Language: English
- Budget: $2.2 million
- Box office: $8.5 million (rentals)

Charly (marketed and stylized as CHAЯLY) is a 1968 American science fiction drama film directed and produced by Ralph Nelson and written by Stirling Silliphant. It is based on Flowers for Algernon, a science-fiction short story (1958) and subsequent novel (1966) by Daniel Keyes.

The film stars Cliff Robertson as Charly Gordon, an intellectually disabled adult who is selected by two doctors to undergo a surgical procedure that triples his IQ as it had done for a laboratory mouse that underwent the same procedure. The film also stars Claire Bloom, Lilia Skala, Leon Janney, Dick Van Patten and Barney Martin. Robertson had played the same role in a 1961 television adaptation titled "The Two Worlds of Charlie Gordon," an episode of the anthology series The United States Steel Hour.

The film received positive reviews and was a success at the box office and later in home media sales. Robertson won Best Actor at the Academy Awards.

== Plot ==
Charly Gordon is an intellectually disabled man who lives in Boston. He has a desire to learn and has attended night school for two years, taking a class taught by Alice Kinnian. He learns to read and write, though his spelling and penmanship are poor and he is unable to spell his own name. He works as a janitor at a bakery, where his coworkers amuse themselves by taking advantage of his disability, and he enjoys playing with children at a playground.

Alice takes Charly to researchers Dr. Richard Nemur and Dr. Anna Straus, who have been investigating methods for increasing intelligence. Having successfully tested a surgical procedure on a lab mouse named Algernon, they are looking for a human test subject. They put Charly through a battery of aptitude tests and have him try to solve a series of paper mazes while Algernon runs through models of them. Charly consistently loses to Algernon, but is selected for the surgery.

After surgery, Charly loses to Algernon again and is frustrated at not immediately becoming smarter. After some time passes, he finally beats Algernon and his intelligence begins to increase. His coworkers tell him to operate a complex machine, hoping that he will break it so they can have the day off, but he successfully operates it. Embarrassed and frightened by his new intelligence, they persuade the bakery owners to fire Charly. Alice continues teaching him, but his intelligence continues to increase and eventually surpasses hers. Lacking emotional maturity, Charly becomes infatuated with Alice and confesses his love for her, but she sharply rejects his advances. He flees in an act of rebellion but eventually returns to Boston, and the two start to consider marriage.

Nemur and Straus present their research at a scientific convention. After playing the film of Charly's original aptitude tests, they bring him out for a question-and-answer session. He is now the intellectual equal or superior of everyone in the audience, but he has also developed a cynical view of humanity that the attendees mistake for humor. He reveals that Algernon has lost his enhanced intelligence and died, facts that the research team kept from him, and expects to undergo a similar decline. Fleeing the convention and seeing hallucinations of his previous self everywhere, Charly stops to help a busboy pick up a tray of dropped glasses after observing that he is intellectually disabled.

Charly overhears Alice, Nemur, and Straus discussing his situation and offers to assist in finding a way to preserve his intelligence, but their combined efforts prove fruitless. He falls into a depression and asks Alice never to visit him again. Some time later, Alice sees Charly playing with children on the playground, having fully regressed to his original level of disability.

== Cast ==
- Cliff Robertson – Charly Gordon
- Claire Bloom – Alice Kinnian
- Lilia Skala – Anna Straus
- Leon Janney – Richard Nemur
- Ruth White – Mrs. Apple
- Dick Van Patten – Bert (as Richard Van Patten)
- Edward McNally – Gimpy (as Skipper McNally)
- Barney Martin – Hank
- William Dwyer – Joey
- Dan Morgan – Paddy

== Production history ==
=== Development ===
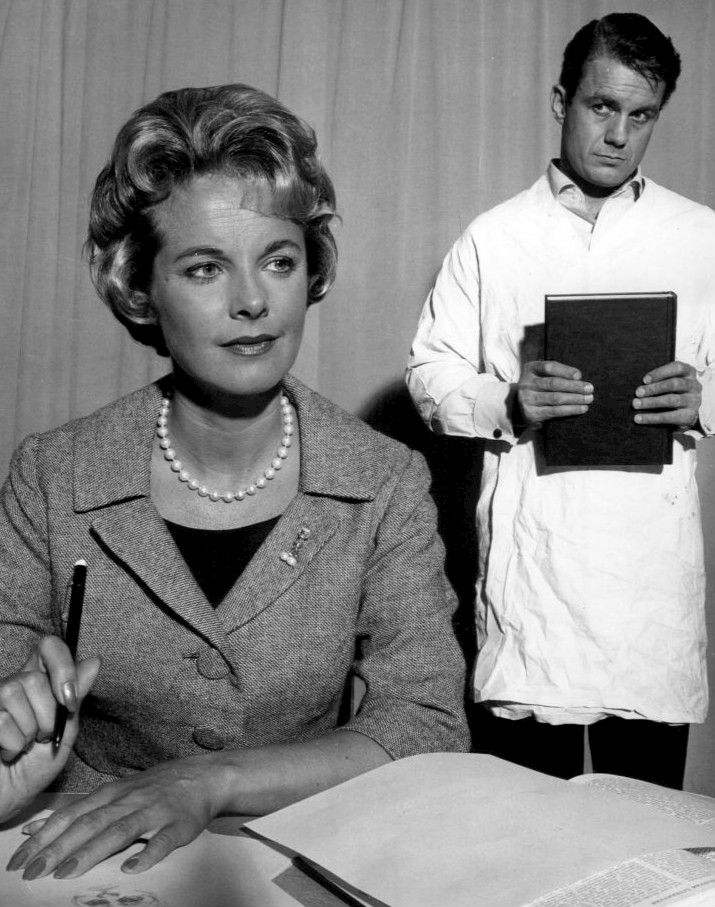
Photo from the 1961 television presentation "The Two Worlds of Charlie Gordon", with Mona Freeman in the role of Alice

The short story Flowers for Algernon had been the basis of "The Two Worlds of Charlie Gordon", a 1961 television adaptation in which Robertson had also starred for The United States Steel Hour. Robertson had starred in a number of television shows that were turned into films with other actors playing his roles, such as Days of Wine and Roses. He bought the rights to the story, hoping to star in the film version as well.

Robertson originally hired William Goldman to write the screenplay on the strength of Goldman's novel No Way to Treat a Lady, paying him $30,000 out of his own pocket. However, Robertson was unhappy with Goldman's work and then hired Stirling Silliphant to write a draft.

Robertson received $25,000 for his role in the film.

== Release ==
The film premiered at the Berlin Film Festival on June 28, 1968. It then opened at the Baronet Theatre in New York City on September 23, 1968.

== Box office ==
The film was a hit, earning $7.25 million in theatrical rentals during its release in North America, and it earned an additional $1.25 million in theatrical rentals overseas, making it the 16th-highest-grossing film of 1968. After all costs were deducted (including $1,325,000 paid to profit share), the film reported a profit of $1,390,000, making it one of the few successful films made by Selmur/ABC Pictures.

== Critical reception ==
Vincent Canby called the film a "self-conscious contemporary drama, the first ever to exploit mental retardation for...the bittersweet romance of it"; he called Robertson's performance "earnest" but points out that "we [the audience] are forced into the vaguely unpleasant position of being voyeurs, congratulating ourselves for not being Charly as often as we feel a distant pity for him." Canby calls Nelson's direction "neo-Expo 67", referring to the use of split screen to "show simultaneously the reactions of two people facing each other and conversing" and the use of "little postage stamp-sized inserts of images within the larger screen frame." Time magazine called Charly an "odd little movie about mental retardation and the dangers of all-conquering science, done with a dash of whimsy." While "the historic sights in and around Charly's Boston setting have never been more lovingly filmed", "The impact of [Robertson's] performance...is lessened by Producer-Director Ralph Nelson's determination to prove that he learned how to be new and now at Expo '67: almost every other sequence is done in split screens, multiple images, still shots or slow motion." Screenwriter Maurice Rapf called Robertson's performance "extraordinary" and called "astonishing" his on-screen "transformation from one end of the intellectual spectrum to the other"; Rapf took issue with what he called the "pyrotechnics of the camera" and the "flashy opticals", calling the effects "jarringly out of place" and better suited for a "no-story mod film like The Knack."

Roger Ebert gave the film three stars out of four, writing "The relationship between Charly (Cliff Robertson) and the girl (Claire Bloom) is handled delicately and well. She cares for him, but inadequately understands the problems he's facing. These become more serious when he passes normal IQ and moves into the genius category; his emotional development falls behind. It is this story, involving a personal crisis, which makes Charly a warm and rewarding film." By contrast, Ebert pointed out "the whole scientific hocus-pocus, which causes his crisis, is irrelevant and weakens the movie by distracting us."

On review aggregator Rotten Tomatoes, the film holds a 55% approval rating based on 20 critical reviews, with an average rating of 6.2/10.

In 2009, Entertainment Weekly listed Charly among its "25 Best Movie Tearjerkers Ever."

== Awards and nominations ==
Award	Category	Nominee(s)	Result	Ref.
Academy Awards	Best Actor	Cliff Robertson	Won	
Berlin International Film Festival	Golden Bear	Ralph Nelson	Nominated	
Golden Globe Awards	Best Motion Picture – Drama		Nominated	
Golden Globe Awards	Best Actor in a Motion Picture – Drama	Cliff Robertson	Nominated	
Golden Globe Awards	Best Screenplay – Motion Picture	Stirling Silliphant	Won	
Hugo Awards	Best Dramatic Presentation	Ralph Nelson, Stirling Silliphant, and Daniel Keyes	Nominated	
Laurel Awards	Top Drama		Nominated	
Laurel Awards	Top Male Dramatic Performance	Cliff Robertson	Nominated	
National Board of Review Awards	Top Ten Films		4th Place	
National Board of Review Awards	Best Actor	Cliff Robertson	Won	

== Proposed sequel ==
In the late 1970s, following a period of extended unemployment after having alerted authorities to illegal activities committed by Columbia Pictures president David Begelman, Robertson wrote and attempted to produce Charly II, to no avail.

== Home media ==
Charly was released on Region 1 DVD by MGM Home Entertainment on March 31, 2005.

== See also ==
- Algernon Charles Swinburne
- List of American films of 1968
- Charlie and Algernon, a musical based upon the original story, Flowers for Algernon.
- Flowers for Algernon (film), a 2000 television film starring Matthew Modine as Charly.
