= Heat (Goldman novel) =

1985 novel by William Goldman

- First edition
- Author: William Goldman
- Language: English
- Publisher: Warner Books
- Publication date: 1985
- Publication place: United States
- Pages: 244
- ISBN: 0-446-51275-3

Heat is a 1985 novel by William Goldman about a soldier of fortune in Las Vegas.

== Plot ==
The novel is about a man named Nick Escalante, nicknamed "the Mex" by his friends, who hires himself out in Las Vegas not as a mercenary or bodyguard but as a service listed in the Yellow Pages directory under "Chaperone." He eschews firearms but is particularly lethal with sharp objects.

Escalante has one ambition, which is to save up enough money so that he can move to Venice, Italy, for the rest of his life. The trouble is, Nick is a compulsive gambler.

When he comes into a large sum of money after coming to the aid of a woman friend who has been physically abused in a Vegas hotel suite by DeMarco, an arrogant mobster, Nick ends up losing it at the blackjack tables. He is hired by a meek millionaire named Cyrus Kinnick on the pretense of needing a bodyguard, but in actuality the small, modest man seeks lessons in how to be a tougher individual who can properly defend himself.

== Background ==
Goldman says he began the novel with "that main character and I had that opening sequence and I'd been in Vegas a lot and it's such a terrible place to be a compulsive gambler and try to earn a living there."

== Reception ==
According to Bruce Cook in Chicago Tribune, the quality of Goldman's novels had declined once he started writing screenplays. Reviewing Heat he said "they're not quite as good in a very peculiar way. First of all, they are written rather casually, as though shot from the hip right onto the page. Just about all of them would have benefitted from another trip through the typewriter--in about the same way that most screenplays would. They are somewhat skeletal in form, reduced to dialogue, abbreviated narrative and a twitchy interior monologue that reads like some kind of high-speed Socratic Q & A...., they seem like screenplays written for the book market." Cook argued Heat was "constructed as a screenplay is, in sequences rather than real chapters. In fact, there is a wonderful bit of misdirection, an illusion created, in the novel's first two sequences that is pure movie magic." Cook did say that while the book may "not be literature, may not even be a novel properly speaking, but as entertainment it is cotton candy all the way."

The Philadelphia Inquirer said "While the book is propelled by action and snappy dialogue, it is the way Goldman reveals his characters, slowly adding dimension to their personalities, that makes Heat a superior novel. "

David Mamet in the New York Times wrote "Goldman is a master storyteller and has done a master's trick. He has made us wish for ourselves the same thing the protagonist wishes for himself. In Heat it is this: to live forever in the safe and magic world he has created – the world of Friendly Hookers; of Roxy, the waitress of table 75; of honorable gangsters; wealthy benefactors; sneering toughs whose faces soon will be ground in the dirt, and interesting friends who will be true to us till death."

The book became a best seller.

== Adaptations ==
- Heat (1986), film directed by Dick Richards and Jerry Jameson
- Wild Card (2015), film directed by Simon West
