= Boys and Girls Together =

1964 novel by William Goldman

- First edition
- Author: William Goldman
- Language: English
- Publisher: Atheneum Press
- Publication date: 1964
- Publication place: United States
- Pages: 623

Boys and Girls Together is a 1964 novel by William Goldman. The title is taken from lyrics in the song, "The Sidewalks of New York".

== Background ==
Goldman says his creative impulse behind the book was his desire to write a long novel:

At the time, all of my friends were screwing up in New York, it seemed. It was going badly for everybody. The city was... affecting all of us, and I wanted to get that down. But writing that novel was a tremendous experience. It was three years of my life on and off.

He later said "the pulse of the book... was the fact that nobody [out of his friends] was making it as I was and I knew I was fraudulent and I knew I'd be found out. It was very hard in those years. It was hard to be 25 or 7 or 8 and to be published when all of your other friends who were writers weren't."

After writing 300 pages, Goldman took some time off to work on Broadway, and when he returned to the book he experienced writer's block, so he wrote another novel instead, No Way to Treat a Lady (1964). Goldman then returned to the novel and eventually finished it, despite being in great physical pain much of the time.

== Reception ==
=== Commercial ===
When Goldman completed his novel, there was a great demand for it among publishers. Goldman says for his first novels he received an advance of $10,000, then $5,000, then $5,000. For Boys and Girls Together, his fourth novel published under his name, he received an advance of $100,000. "I don't know if Soldier in the Rain had sold to the movies or whatever happened, but there were a bunch of people [publishers] who wanted Boys and Girls Together", he said.

The novel was a best seller. "That summer, Boys and Girls Together was the beach book in paperback", says Goldman."

=== Critical ===
William Goldman says his editor, Hiram Haydn, thought the novel "was going to establish me as a serious American novelist – and it got crucified. It just got very, very badly reviewed because people thought I was more popular than I was."

Goldman later elaborated:

Boys and Girls Together was three years of my life and I thought it was not what I meant. It was depressing, and not at all what I had meant when I started. It's so hard to fill that many pages, and I thought, "Well, it's not what I meant, but at least they'll have to think I'm serious. Nobody would write this depressing a book, in which nobody gets what they want and everybody fails, if you're trying to be Harold Robbins." There was a review of Boys and Girls Together that I remember very clearly. It was one of the most painful reviews of my life by a critic from The New York Times called Conrad Knickerbocker... [which] compared me with Harold Robbins, and I thought, "You never read Harold Robbins. They get what they want in that world, and this is basically a cold, unpleasant book." I remember for a month I was on the verge of tears.

Richard Andersen wrote of the novel:

Seeing all their energies leading to death and betrayal, the characters of Boys and Girls Together conclude that there are no satisfactory alternatives. Life is hopeless. Nevertheless, suicide is not the answer; man must find a way to affirm life over death whenever his identities fail him. One way of achieving affirmation in the wasteland, Goldman seems to be saying, is through endurance.

== Adaptations ==
Film rights were bought by producers Elliot Kastner and Jerry Gershwin. In June 1966 it was reported director Sydney Pollack was attached and David Rayfiel was writing a script. However a film was never made.

Goldman worked on a musical version of the story, called Magic Town, which remains unproduced.

In 1976, it was announced the novel would be turned into a mini-series, but this did not happen.

== Bibliography ==
- Andersen, Richard (1979). William Goldman. Twayne Publishers.
- Egan, Sean (2014). William Goldman: The Reluctant Storyteller. Bear Manor Media.
