= Hiram Haydn =

American writer and editor

Hiram Collins Haydn (November 3, 1907 – December 2, 1973) was an American writer and editor. He was editor in chief at Random House before leaving to help establish Atheneum Publishing. He was also the editor of Phi Beta Kappa's literary journal, The American Scholar, from 1944 to 1973.

== Biography ==
Born in Cleveland, Ohio, Haydn graduated from Amherst College in 1928, and later received a master's degree from Western Reserve University and a Ph.D. from Columbia University in 1942. He married Rachel Hutchinson Norris in 1935, later divorced; in 1945 he married Mary Wescott Tuttle.

In 1945 Haydn became editor, later editor in chief, for Crown Publishers until he moved to Bobbs-Merrill in 1950 and to Random House in 1955, where he became editor in chief in 1956. In 1959 he became one of the founders of Atheneum together with Simon Bessie and Alfred Knopf Jr. He left in 1964 to join Harcourt, Brace & World.

Among the writers he worked with as editor were William Styron, William Goldman, William Faulkner, and Ayn Rand. Books series he edited included the Makers of the American Tradition Series (Bobbs-Merrill) and The Twentieth Century Library (Charles Scribner's Sons).

He wrote five novels, as well as an academic work about the "counter revolution" that he argued took place during the middle period of the Renaissance. His memoir, Words & Faces, was published posthumously. During his career he also taught at several colleges including the University of North Carolina, The New School for Social Research, the Center for Advanced Study at Wesleyan University, and the Annenberg School for Communication at the University of Pennsylvania.

Haydn had a seasonal home in Chilmark, Massachusetts, on Martha's Vineyard, where he died of a heart attack in December 1973 at age 66. He was survived by his wife Mary, two sons, and two daughters.

== Books ==
=== Novels ===
- By Nature Free (1943)
- Manhattan Furlough (1945)
- The Time is Noon (1948)
- The Hands of Esau (1962)
- Report from the Red Windmill (1967)

=== History ===
- The Counter-Renaissance (1950)

=== Memoir ===
- Words & Faces (1974)
