= Jack Smight =

American film director (1925–2003)

- Born: John Ronald Smight; March 9, 1925; Minneapolis, Minnesota, U.S.
- Died: September 1, 2003 (aged 78); Los Angeles, California, U.S.
- Education: University of Minnesota (B.A., 1949)
- Occupations: Film director, television director
- Spouse: Joyce Cunning (m. 1950; died 2002)
- Children: 2, including Alec Smight

John Ronald Smight (March 9, 1925 – September 1, 2003) was an American film and television director. He was best known for his thriller and action films, notably Harper (1966), No Way to Treat a Lady (1968), Airport 1975 (1974), Midway (1976), Damnation Alley (1977), and Number One with a Bullet (1987). FilmInk described him as "a perfect example of the 'journeyman' director."

== Early life and education ==
Smight was born in Minneapolis, Minnesota, the son of Irish Catholic immigrants. He graduated from Cretin High School with future actor Peter Graves. They acted together in summer stock productions, and Graves played in a 15-piece band that Smight led.

He joined the Army Air Forces, flying missions in the Pacific during World War II, before graduating with a bachelor of arts degree from the University of Minnesota in 1949. He then sought work as an actor. He worked as a radio actor and had a bit part in a stage production of Anna Lucasta in 1949.

== Career ==
=== Television ===
He became stage manager for TV's The Good Egg of the Week and then assistant director on The Colgate Comedy Hour and The Dennis Day Show. He said a big break was working on Visit to a Small Planet with Cyril Ritchard.

In 1959, he won an Emmy Award for his direction of the hour-long play Eddie, which starred Mickey Rooney. He directed episodes for The Twilight Zone and The Alfred Hitchcock Hour.

He directed the 1960 Broadway play The 49th Cousin.

=== Feature films ===
Smight's first feature film was I'd Rather Be Rich (1964), a remake of It Started with Eve (1941). Smight said "it was not a particularly good script but it opened up a whole new life for me."

Smight then signed a contract with Warners to make six films in one a year. He produced and directed The Third Day (1965) and then directed the Paul Newman vehicle Harper (1966). He followed that with the British action comedy, Kaleidoscope (1966) with Warren Beatty.

In 1966, he signed a three-picture deal with Mirisch Brothers and bought the rights to the book The Illustrated Man. In 1968, he directed the cult classic comedic thriller No Way to Treat a Lady, starring Rod Steiger and George Segal. Other notable films directed by Smight include Airport 1975 (1974) and Midway (1976), back-to-back box office hits.

In 1976, Smight was hired to direct the technically-complex Damnation Alley, expected to be another box office hit upon release. After the director's cut was delivered, and Smight moved on to other projects, studio meddling and re-editing resulted in a drastically altered film, which was released and failed at the box office.

Smight's last film, The Favorite (1989), also known as La Nuit du serail, was a co-production of the United States and Switzerland.

== Personal life ==
Smight was married to actress Joyce Cunning, and he had two sons, including editor/director Alec Smight.

=== Death ===
Smight died of cancer on September 1, 2003, in Los Angeles.

== Filmography ==
=== Film ===
Year	Title	Notes
1964	I'd Rather Be Rich	
1965	The Third Day	Also producer
1966	Harper	
1966	Kaleidoscope	
1968	The Secret War of Harry Frigg	
1968	No Way to Treat a Lady	
1969	The Illustrated Man	
1969	Strategy of Terror	
1970	Rabbit, Run	
1970	The Traveling Executioner	Also producer
1974	Airport 1975	
1976	Midway	
1977	Damnation Alley	
1979	Fast Break	
1980	Loving Couples	
1987	Number One with a Bullet	
1989	The Favorite	

=== Television ===
Year	Title	Notes
1949	One Man's Family	TV series
1955	Repertory Theatre	2 episodes
1955	Goodyear Playhouse	2 episodes
1956-57	Climax!	13 episodes
1956-58	General Electric Theater	2 episodes
1957	The Seven Lively Arts	Episode: "The Sound of Jazz"
1957-58	Studio One in Hollywood	4 episodes
1957-58	Suspicion	3 episode
1958	Alcoa Theatre	Episode: Eddie
1959	Oldsmobile Music Theatre	Episode: "A Nice Place to Hide"
1959	The DuPont Show with June Allyson	2 episodes
1959-61	The Twilight Zone	4 episodes
1960	The United States Steel Hour	Episode "Shadow of a Pale Horse"
1960-61	Art Carney Special	2 episodes
1960-61	NBC Sunday Showcase	2 episodes
1960-61	Our American Heritage	4 episodes
1961	Naked City	Episode: "Dead on the Field of Honor"
1961	Route 66	Episode: "Goodnight Sweet Blues"
1961	The Law and Mr. Jones	Episode: "Lincoln"
1961-62	Westinghouse Presents	2 episodes
1962	The Defenders	2 episodes
1962	The DuPont Show of the Week	5 episodes
1962	Alcoa Premiere	Episode: "Broken Year"
1963	The Alfred Hitchcock Hour	4 episodes
1963	East Side/West Side	2 episodes
1963	Arrest and Trial	5 episodes
1963-64	Dr. Kildare	3 episodes
1964-65	Kraft Suspense Theatre	4 episodes
1971	Columbo	Episode: "Dead Weight"
1971-72	McCloud	2 episodes
1972	Banacek	2 episodes
1972	Madigan	2 episodes
1986	Code of Vengeance	2 episodes

==== TV films, specials, and miniseries ====
Year	Title
1958	Victor Borge's Comedy in Music III
1959	The Ten Commandments
1959	The Sound of Miles Davis
1960	Destiny, West!
1961	The Enchanted Nutcracker
1972	The Screaming Woman
1972	The Longest Night
1973	Partners in Crime
1973	Double Indemnity
1973	Linda
1973	Frankenstein: The True Story
1973	Legend in Granite
1974	The Man from Independence
1978	Roll of Thunder, Hear My Cry
1982	Remembrance of Love

== Awards and nominations ==
Award	Year	Category	Work	Result	Ref.
Primetime Emmy Awards	1959	Directing for a Drama Series	Alcoa Theatre ("Eddie")	Won	
Primetime Emmy Awards	1962	Directing for a Drama Series	Westinghouse Presents ("Come Again to Carthage")	Nominated	
Hugo Award	1970	Best Dramatic Presentation	The Illustrated Man	Nominated	
