= Mark Rydell =

American film director and actor (1929–2026)

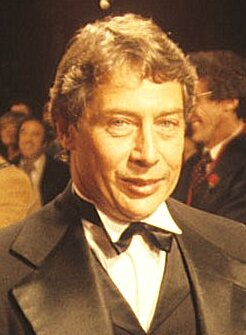
- Rydell in 1979
- Born: Mortimer H. Rydell; March 23, 1929; New York City, U.S.
- Died: August 13, 2026 (aged 97); Woodland Hills, California, U.S.
- Education: Juilliard School of Music; Neighborhood Playhouse School of the Theatre; Actors Studio
- Occupations: Film director; producer; actor
- Years active: 1952–2020
- Spouses: Joanne Linville (m. 1962; div. 1973) Esther Rydell (m. 1984; div. 2007)
- Children: 3

Mortimer H. "Mark" Rydell (March 23, 1929 – August 13, 2026) was an American film director, producer and actor. He directed several Academy Award-nominated films including The Fox (1967), The Reivers (1969), Cinderella Liberty (1973), The Rose (1979), and The River (1984). He was nominated for an Academy Award for Best Director for On Golden Pond (1981).

== Early life ==
Mortimer H. Rydell was born in New York City on March 23, 1929, to a Jewish family. He initially trained in music. As a youth, he wanted to be a conductor. He said he left music because of the proliferation of drugs among the musicians: "Heroin was the drug of choice. "Knowing that I have an addict's personality in that a little is good but a lot is better, I knew I was in danger... I went back to college and went to the Neighborhood Playhouse."

Rydell attended the Juilliard School of Music in Manhattan and trained as an actor at the Neighborhood Playhouse School of the Theatre and at the Actors Studio.

== Career ==
=== Actor ===
His first significant roles were as Walt Johnson on The Edge of Night, and as Jeff Baker on As the World Turns, which he played from December 12, 1956, to 1962. The role of Jeff was a particularly popular role with the audience.

In 1962, Rydell declined to sign another long-term contract at ATWT, and producers had his character die in a car crash. He later won plaudits for his role of violent Jewish mob kingpin Marty Augustine in Robert Altman's The Long Goodbye (1973). His last significant film role was in Woody Allen's Hollywood Ending (2002).

=== Television director ===
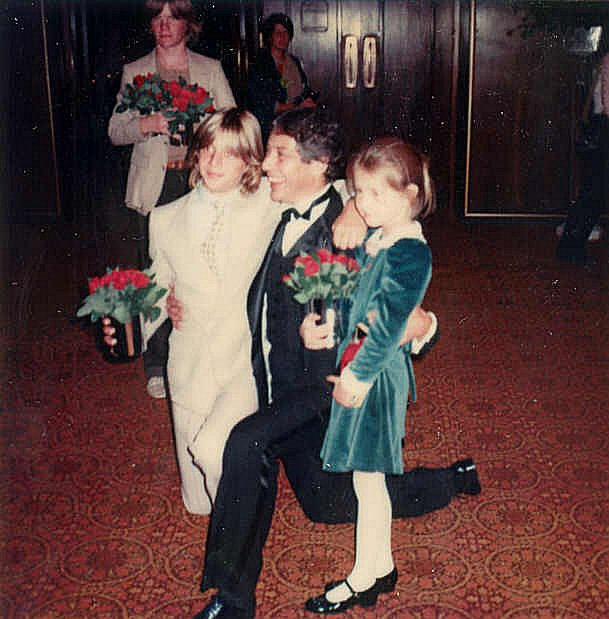
Rydell at the premiere of The Rose in November 1979

Rydell moved into being a director and soon became very successful. He did episodes of Mr. Novak; Ben Casey; The Reporter; Slattery's People; I Spy; The Wild Wild West; The Long, Hot Summer; and Gunsmoke. He said later: "I come from the school of sitting around the table for two weeks examining every detail of the material, working out relationships with the actors, so they know what they are doing, bringing them to locations, so they can get comfortable."

=== Feature films ===
Rydell's first feature as director was The Fox (1967) which was a box-office hit, in part due to its then-rare lesbian content. He signed a multi-picture contract with the film's producer Raymond Stross, but disliked working with him. Rydell said he ended up paying out four times his fee for the picture to get out of the contract. Nonetheless, he credited Stross for starting his film career. He directed Steve McQueen in The Reivers (1969). Rydell and friend Sydney Pollack, who had known each other since they were both actors, formed a company, Sanford Productions, and signed a six picture contract with the Mirisch Brothers. They planned to make Good Luck, Miss Wyckoff, which was eventually made in 1979 by other filmmakers.

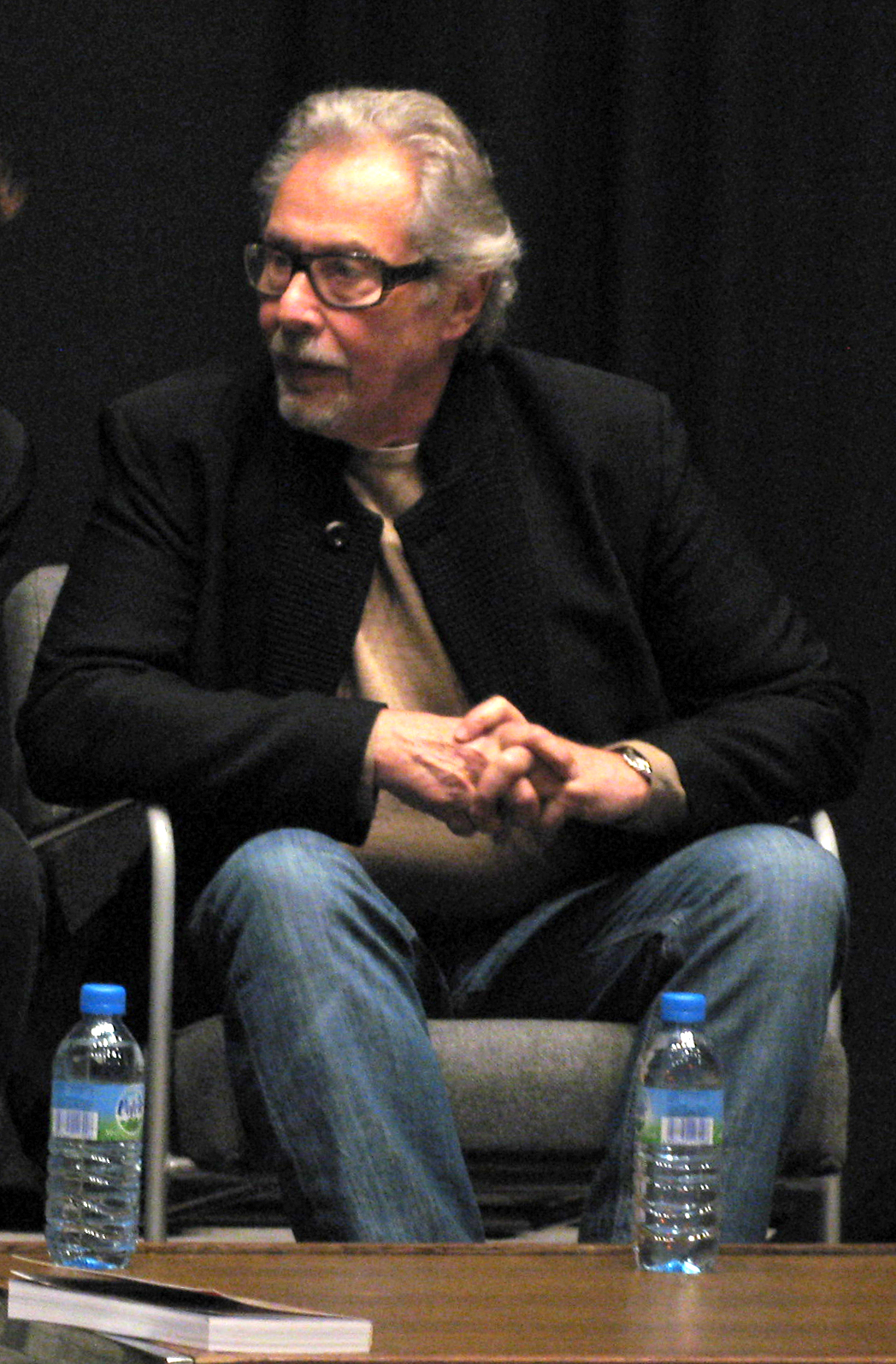
Rydell in November 2008

Rydell directed John Wayne in The Cowboys (1972). He made a romantic comedy, Cinderella Liberty (1973), with James Caan and Marsha Mason. Around that time he said he did not want to make genre movies: "I want to create my own genre." He was reunited with Caan on Harry and Walter Go to New York (1976) which starred Elliott Gould and was a box-office flop. Rydell also directed the pilot episode of Family (1976).

Rydell directed The Rose (1979), starring Bette Midler, which was a huge hit. So too was On Golden Pond (1981), starring Henry Fonda and Katharine Hepburn, for which Rydell received an Oscar nomination as Best Director. "I'm this week's heat", he joked at the time. He was going to make a film based on the play Nuts but instead directed The River (1984), with Mel Gibson and Sissy Spacek. It was not a commercial success. Neither was Rydell's next film, For the Boys (1991), with Caan and Midler.

He made the television movie McBride and Groom (1993) and the feature Intersection (1994). He directed the television movies Crime of the Century (1996), which starred Isabella Rossellini and Stephen Rea, and James Dean (2001), which earned actor James Franco a Golden Globe award. Rydell also acted in the movie, playing Jack L. Warner (head of Warner Bros). He was credited as executive producer on An Unfinished Life (2005).

In 2006, Rydell directed the movie Even Money. One of his last credits is an episode of Masters of Science Fiction, "A Clean Escape". Working with actor Martin Landau and screenwriter/playwright Lyle Kessler in 2009, Rydell produced an education seminar, The Total Picture Seminar. The two-day event covers the disciplines of acting, directing, and writing for film. The three have worked together as a team for many decades at The Actors Studio teaching and coaching professional actors, writers, and directors. In 2010, Rydell joined the Advisory Board of Openfilm, which was an online video sharing site created to help aspiring independent filmmakers. Rydell executive produced the documentary A Coup in Camelot (2015).

== Personal life and death ==
Rydell and actress Joanne Linville married in 1962. They had two children, Amy and Christopher, both actors. They divorced in 1973. Rydell had another son, Alexander, from a second marriage to documentary producer Esther Rydell. The union ended in divorce in 2007.

Rydell died of natural causes at the Motion Picture & Television Country House and Hospital in Woodland Hills, on August 13, 2026, at the age of 97.

== Filmography ==
=== As director ===
==== Film ====
- The Fox (1967)
- The Reivers (1969)
- The Cowboys (1972)
- Cinderella Liberty (1973)
- Harry and Walter Go to New York (1976)
- The Rose (1979)
- On Golden Pond (1981)
- The River (1984)
- For the Boys (1991)
- Intersection (1994)
- Even Money (2006)

==== Television ====
- The Phil Silvers Show (episode of TV series) (1955)
- Mr. Novak (episode of TV series) (1964)
- Ben Casey (episodes of TV series) (1963–64)
- The Reporter (episode on TV series) (1964)
- Slattery's People (episode of TV series) (1965)
- I Spy (episodes of TV series) (1965)
- The Wild Wild West (episode of TV series) (1966)
- The Long, Hot Summer (episodes of TV series) (1965–66)
- The Fugitive (episode of TV series) (1966)
- Gunsmoke (episodes of TV series) (1964–66)
- Family (episode of TV series) (1976)
- McBride and Groom (failed pilot) (1993)
- Crime of the Century (TV movie) (1996)
- James Dean (TV movie) (2001) (plus actor, playing Jack L. Warner)
- Masters of Science Fiction (episode "A Clean Escape" of TV series) (2007)

==== Unrealized ====
- The Thing of It Is...
- The Exorcist

=== As actor ===
- Crime in the Streets (1956) as Lou Macklin
- The Long Goodbye (1973) as Marty Augustine
- Punchline (1988) as Romeo
- Havana (1990) as Meyer Lansky
- A Man Is Mostly Water (2000) as Distributor
- Hollywood Ending (2002) as Al
- Senior Entourage (2020) as Mark

== Accolades ==
Year	Film	Academy Awards		BAFTAs		Golden Globes	
Year	Film	Nominations	Wins	Nominations	Wins	Nominations	Wins
1967	The Fox	1				4	1
1969	The Reivers	2				2	
1973	Cinderella Liberty	3				5	1
1979	The Rose	4		2		5	3
1981	On Golden Pond	10	3	6	1	6	3
1984	The River	5	1			2	
1991	For the Boys	1				2	1
Total		26	4	8	1	26	9

Directed Academy Award Performances

Under Rydell's direction, these actors have received Oscar nominations and wins for their performances of these respective roles.

Year	Performer	Film	Result
Best Actor Oscar
1982	Henry Fonda	On Golden Pond	Won
Best Actress Oscar
1974	Marsha Mason	Cinderella Liberty	Nominated
1980	Bette Midler	The Rose	Nominated
1982	Katharine Hepburn	On Golden Pond	Won
1985	Sissy Spacek	The River	Nominated
1992	Bette Midler	For the Boys	Nominated
Best Supporting Actor Oscar
1970	Rupert Crosse	The Reivers	Nominated
1980	Frederic Forrest	The Rose	Nominated
Best Supporting Actress Oscar
1982	Jane Fonda	On Golden Pond	Nominated
