= I Want What I Want =

I Want What I Want may refer to:

- I Want What I Want (novel), a 1966 novel by Geoff Brown
- I Want What I Want (film), a 1972 British drama film, based on the novel
