= The Undergrowth of Literature =

1967 study of pornography by Gillian Freeman

The Undergrowth of Literature is a pioneering study of pornography written by the British author Gillian Freeman in 1967. The foreword is by David Stafford-Clark. A review by Stephen Vizinczey described it as 'nothing more than a collection of quotes, précis, paraphrases and photographs from current pornographic publications and glossy magazines ... there is no love like the liberal prig's love for perverts and perversions'.
