= A Touch of the Sun (1956 film) =

British comedy

- Directed by: Gordon Parry
- Written by: Alfred Shaughnessy
- Produced by: Raymond Stross
- Starring: Frankie Howerd; Ruby Murray; Dennis Price; Dorothy Bromiley
- Cinematography: Arthur Grant
- Edited by: Charles Hasse
- Music by: Eric Spear
- Production company: Raymond Stross Productions
- Distributed by: Eros Films
- Release date: 12 November 1956
- Running time: 80 minutes
- Country: United Kingdom
- Language: English

A Touch of the Sun is a 1956 British comedy film directed by Gordon Parry and starring Frankie Howerd, Ruby Murray and Dennis Price. It was written by Alfred Shaughnessy.

== Plot ==
A hall porter is left a large inheritance by one of the residents. After taking a luxury holiday he takes over the failing hotel and begins running it himself.

== Cast ==
- Frankie Howerd as William Darling
- Ruby Murray as Ruby
- Dennis Price as Digby Hatchard
- Dorothy Bromiley as Rose Blake
- Katherine Kath as Lucienne
- Gordon Harker as Sid
- Reginald Beckwith as Herbert Hardcastle
- Pierre Dudan as Louis
- Colin Gordon as Cecil Flick
- Richard Wattis as Purchase
- Alfie Bass as May
- Naomi Chance as Miss Caroline Lovejoy
- Miriam Karlin as Alice Cann
- Willoughby Goddard as Golightly
- Aïché Nana as belly dancer
- George Margo as Howard Cann
- Esma Cannon as Miss Tickle
- Lucy Griffiths as Aggie

== Production ==
The film was made by the independent producer Raymond Stross, and shot at Nettlefold Studios, in Walton-on-Thames, Surrey, with sets designed by the art director John Stoll.

== Critical reception ==
In a contemporary review Kine Weekly said "There is not much of a story, but Frankie Howerd improvises cleverly in the lead and the well-known supporting players also seize their chances. Colourful settings and catchy tunes put the finishing touches to a disarming romp. Very good."

The Monthly Film Bulletin wrote: "This ponderous comedy vehicle for Frankie Howerd and Ruby Murray exploits many well-worn farcical situations. The supporting players make the most of limited opportunities."

In British Sound Films: The Studio Years 1928–1959 David Quinlan rated the film as "mediocre", writing: "Corny comedy does disservice to its talented cast."

Leslie Halliwell wrote: "Limp comedy vehicle."

The Radio Times Guide to Films gave the film 2/5 stars, writing: "Try as he might, Frankie Howard just couldn't crack movies. This was his fifth feature after he made his name on radio's Variety Bandbox, but the harder he mugged, the less amusing he became."
