= Father's Day (novel) =

1971 novel by William Goldman

- First edition
- Author: William Goldman
- Language: English
- Publisher: Harcourt Brace
- Publication date: 1971
- Publication place: United States
- Pages: 215
- ISBN: 0-15-130435-1

Father's Day is a 1971 novel by William Goldman. It is a sequel to The Thing of It Is... and revolves around a day in the life of now-divorced Amos McCracken as he looks after his daughter for a day.

== Background ==
Goldman says he was inspired to write the book by a situation which had occurred a number of years previously. Producers of a musical had fired the original writer and hired Goldman and his brother James to rewrite it. Goldman:

Now, when you're replaced, it's very wounding, but it happens to everybody and you leave, but the writer we replaced wouldn't. So that, basically, was where being fired out of town in the novel came from, but in this case, it was terrifying because the original writer just wouldn't leave. And I understand how terrible it must be. The McCracken situation came from that one. The characters in the book are repeating the same group that's had an earlier hit in the novel. The impossible way that writer acted out of a sense of distraughtness is Amos.

In 1981 it was reported actor-director Peter Masterson, a friend of Goldman's, had the film rights and Robert Duvall was interested in starring. However as of 2025 no film has been made of Father's Day.

== The Settle for Less Club ==
Goldman later said he intended Father's Day to be book two of a trilogy with the third book called The Settle for Less Club. It was going to be about Amos in Hollywood when the movie of his musical is being made. Goldman:

What happens is, Amos decides to marry the girl, who was his mistress, and wants to bring the daughter out for the wedding, but his ex-wife comes too. The two of them get together, and what you do in life, basically is settle for less. Anyway, I don't know if I'll ever write it because the movie business has shifted. At the time I was writing the trilogy, it was standard that if the musical was a hit on Broadway, they would make a movie out of it, but that doesn't happen anymore.

Goldman died in 2018, and no third novel about Amos was ever published.

== Sources ==
- Andersen, Richard, William Goldman, Twayne Publishers, 1979
