= The First Time on the Grass =

1974 film

- Directed by: Gianluigi Calderone
- Written by: Gianluigi Calderone; Vincenzo Cerami
- Produced by: Enzo Doria
- Starring: Anne Heywood
- Cinematography: Marcello Gatti
- Edited by: Nino Baragli
- Music by: Fiorenzo Carpi
- Release date: 1974
- Running time: 95 minutes
- Country: Italy
- Language: Italian

The First Time on the Grass (Italian: La prima volta sull'erba, and known in the United States as Love Under the Elms) is a 1974 Italian drama film directed by Gianluigi Calderone. It was entered into the 25th Berlin International Film Festival.

It was one of several leading roles Anne Heywood played in Italian movies.

== Cast ==
- Anne Heywood as Margherita
- Mark Lester as Franz
- Claudio Cassinelli as Hans
- Monica Guerritore as Lotte
- Giovanna Di Bernardo
- Bruno Zanin
- Vincenzo Ferro
- Janine Samona
- Anna Waidmann
- Giuseppe Winkler
- Lorenzo Piani
