= The Killer Is on the Phone =

The Killer is on the Phone
- Directed by: Alberto De Martino
- Screenplay by: Alberto De Martino; Vincenzo Mannino; Adriano Bolzoni; Renato Izzo
- Story by: Alberto De Martino; Vincenzo Mannino; Adriano Bolzoni; Renato Izzo
- Produced by: Guy Luongo; Aldo Scavarda
- Starring: Telly Savalas; Anne Heywood; Osvaldo Ruggieri; Giorgio Piazza
- Cinematography: Aristide Massaccesi
- Edited by: Otello Colangeli
- Music by: Stelvio Cipriani
- Production companies: Difnei Cinematografica; S.O.D.E.P., Bruxelles
- Distributed by: Jumbo Cinematografica
- Release date: 1972
- Countries: Italy; Belgium

The Killer Is on the Phone (Italian: L'assassino... è al telefono) is a 1972 giallo film directed by Alberto De Martino. It was released in the U.S. in July, 1975. The film is set in Bruges, Belgium, and stars Telly Savalas and Anne Heywood. The story follows an attractive actress who has amnesia and paranoia triggered by a chance encounter with a professional assassin, who in turn begins to follow her with his knife.

== Plot ==
Professional killer Ranko is to assassinate Dillon, a United Nations emissary sent to help reach an understanding between England, Arab oil suppliers, and the Seven Sisters.

Boarding a ferry, Ranko spots Eleonor Loraine, an actress. Seeing him, she loses consciousness. Eleonor then starts suffering from amnesia, which reaches back five years to when Peter Vervoort, her lover, supposedly died in a car accident. Because she recognised him, Ranko, who actually killed Peter, abandons his assignment and keeps following her, waiting for an opportunity to murder her too.

Eleonor, home in Bruges, is surprised to find that her house was razed years ago. She calls the Flamingo Theater to speak to Peter, and her sister Dorothy reminds her that they visited his grave together. Eleonor visits the crypt of Peter Vervoort and another Eleonor, his mother. Dorothy takes Eleonor to her current home, where Doctor Chandler and theatre critic George await her, neither of whom she recognises, despite being married to the latter for three years. In a paranoid fit, she believes everybody is acting to drive her mad. Chandler sedates her.

Her actor colleague Thomas Braun- a former secret lover of hers- visits her at the hospital, where Chandler administers a truth serum to cure her. In a vision, she sees herself kissing Peter while Ranko approaches, touching her with his knife and exposing her breasts.

Eleonor goes to the theatre to rehearse the leading role in Lady Godiva, which is to premiere the same week. Ranko awaits her in the lobby but does not strike, irritated that she does not recognise him. On stage, Eleonor erroneously recites the monologue of Lady Macbeth, which was on five years ago.

Walking through Bruges, Eleonor meets a jester who triggers memories. One night, Eleonor had sex with Thomas and revealed her first time was when she was 13. He called her a whore, then clang to her legs, saying he could not live without her. Coming home at night, Eleonor finds a pistol in the drawer and confronts her husband. When Ranko calls, George picks up; Ranko remains silent. Eleonor sees how George puts something in her drink and runs away.

She remembers telling Thomas to kill Peter. Later, Ranko follows her to Thomas' door, where he stabs her in the stomach. She asks Thomas if she still loves her; he affirms, and she shoots him, then dies of her wound. It is revealed that she relived the end of a play in a flashback and now believes that her current fear of being murdered stems from acting in those plays. Eleonor and Thomas have sex again, through which Eleonor proves to herself that they were never lovers.

In the meantime, Ranko keeps postponing his flight to London. His clients approach him, worrying about the success of Dillon's assassination, for which Ranko was hired.

Margaret Vervoort, Peter’s sister and owner of the theatre, wants Dorothy to take Eleonor's part. Ranko enters Eleonor's dressing room and mistakes Dorothy for Eleonor. He kisses her while stabbing her.

Margaret tells George that Eleonor owns a small castle near the Sint-Andriesdreef, which she used as a love nest with Peter. George and Eleonor drive to the castle, where she remembers Peter holding a gun and threatening Ranko, who stabbed him and drove off with his body in the trunk. She "returns" from her vision only to witness Ranko stab George and escapes by car, hiding in the deserted theatre. Eleonor drops parts of the stage on Ranko, making a piano fall on his legs, which pins him. She then activates the safety curtain, which comes down and crushes his abdomen.

Eleonor goes to the Vervoort estate to confront Margaret, a gun in her purse. Margaret claims she truly wanted George to save Eleonor from her trauma and did not order Ranko to kill Peter, only to scare him away; she confesses doing it because she wanted Eleonor for herself. Eleonor drops her gun, kisses her, then announces that she will make life hell for her as long as she lives. Eleonor walks away in the sunlight. After hearing a shot from inside, she stops briefly, then continues walking.

== Cast ==
- Telly Savalas as Ranko Drasovic
- Anne Heywood as Eleanor Loraine
- Osvaldo Ruggeri as Thomas Brown
- Giorgio Piazza as George
- Willeke van Ammelrooy as Dorothy
- Rossella Falk as Margaret Vervoort
- Antonio Guidi as Dr. Chandler
- Roger Van Hool as Peter Vervoort
- Ada Pometti as Nurse

== Production ==
The film was one of several leading roles Anne Heywood played in Italy.

== Release ==
The Killer is on the Phone was released in 1972 and grossed a total of 238 million Italian lire domestically.

The film was released on home video in the United Kingdom as Scenes From a Murder and The Final Curtain. Author Adrian Luther Smith noted that The Final Curtain release had a particularly "poor quality dark transfer."

== Reception ==
In a contemporary review, Scott Meek of the Monthly Film Bulletin stated that the film "will surely disappoint even the most ardent [Telly Savalas] fans as his contribution consists of scarcely a dozen lines and a series of identical non-expressions presumably intended to appear menacing." and "the greatest mystery of all is the title, which (in this version, at least) bears no relation whatsoever to the plot."

In his overview of gialli film, Troy Howarth described the film as "fairly typical of Alberto De Martino's output: blandly efficient" with "pedestrian direction", and that Aristide Massaccesi's cinematography was "decent but lack[ed] the poetic touch that he brought to What Have You Done to Solange?". Adrian Luther Smith in his book on Italian sex and horror films described the feature as "a fairly routine outing" with Stelvio Cipriani conrtibuting "a middling, but unmemorable score in keeping with the rest of the production."
