= Matilda Thorpe =

British actress

- Born: Matilda Helen Rachel Thorpe; Wood Green, Middlesex, England
- Occupation: Actress

Matilda Helen Rachel Thorpe is a British actress. Thorpe trained at London's Central School of Speech and Drama. She is known for her roles in the Channel 4 sitcoms Desmond's (1989–1994) and Porkpie (1995–1996), and Sick Note (2017–2018) for Sky One. She played Nina in the movie One Life. She is the sister of actress Harriet Thorpe.

== Career ==
Thorpe is the daughter of the writers Gillian Freeman and Edward Thorpe. Her mother was Jewish.

Thorpe's television appearances include Amanda in Gems (1986), Narrator in Pinny's House (1986), Friend in Murder Most Horrid (1991), Jane in The Upper Hand (1992), Mandy Mosgrove in Desmond's (1989–1994), Mandy Ambrose in Porkpie (1995–1996), Mother in How to Be a Little Sod (1995), Keeping Mum (1997), Barbara Robertson in The Jump (1998), Sarah Johnson in Casualty (1998), Personnel Officer in Wonderful You (1999), Inspector Shaw in Bad Girls (2002), Marcia Heyman in Holby City (2003), Marianne Wild in Doctors (2004), Sue Jenner in The Bill (2005), Receptionist in Rosemary & Thyme (2006), Mary in Robin Hood (2006) and Rupert Grint's mother, Claire Glass in two series of Sick Note (2017–18).

Her film roles include Nina in One Life (2023), Aunt Melody (Back to Black 2024) Queen of Hearts (1989), Stationer in Crush (2001), and Andrea in Not Another Happy Ending (2013).

Stage appearances include It's a Girl (Winner Time Out Best Musical) (1989) and When We Are Married (Winner Olivier Award Best Comedy) at the Garrick Theatre (2010). Emma in Way Upstream - Alan Ayckbourn at the New Vic Theatre, Stoke on Trent, (1989) Pauline in Golden Girls at Leeds Playhouse, (1985) Olive in Joking Apart - Alan Ayckbourn at The Mill at Sonning Theatre, (1994) Shutters Triple Bill at the Park Theatre, Finsbury Park, (2014) was a member of the 'Dogs on Holiday' comedy improvisation team at the Hurricane Club in London's West End for 10 years, who famously performed alongside Robin Williams, among others.
