= Good Luck, Miss Wyckoff =

- Poster designed by Design Projects, Inc.
- Directed by: Marvin J. Chomsky
- Written by: Polly Platt
- Based on: novel by William Inge
- Produced by: Raymond Stross
- Starring: Anne Heywood; John Lafayette
- Cinematography: Álex Phillips Jr.
- Edited by: Rita Roland
- Music by: Ernest Gold
- Distributed by: Bel Air-Gradison Productions
- Release date: April 1979
- Running time: 105 minutes
- Country: United States
- Language: English

Good Luck, Miss Wyckoff is a 1979 American drama film directed by Marvin J. Chomsky. The screenplay by Polly Platt is based on the 1970 novel of the same title by William Inge. Inge wrote two novels, both set in the fictional town of Freedom, Kansas. In Good Luck, Miss Wyckoff, high-school Latin teacher Evelyn Wyckoff loses her job because she has an affair with the school's black janitor. The novel's themes include spinsterhood, racism, sexual tension and public humiliation during the late 1950s. The film version stars Anne Heywood, John Lafayette, Donald Pleasence, Robert Vaughn, Dorothy Malone and, in her final film, Carolyn Jones.

== Plot ==
In 1954 in Freedom, a fictional small Kansas town, Evelyn Wyckoff, a lonely and greatly depressed 35-year-old high-school Latin teacher, no longer finds any satisfaction in her work, in spite of being well-liked by students and colleagues. Attractive but still a virgin, on the verge of premature menopause, she learns her physician Dr. Neal thinks her problems would be solved if she were to begin a romantic relationship. He directs her to Dr. Steiner, a psychiatrist in Wichita. The talks with Steiner help her, and slowly she acknowledges her craving for love. She starts flirting with Ed Eckles, the friendly bus driver on her trips to Wichita. Ed cares for her and suggests they should have a love affair. She hesitates because Ed is married. When she is finally willing, she finds Ed has left town for good.

One day she is accosted by Rafe Collins, a cocky black college scholarship student who cleans classrooms at the end of the school day. When the young man boldly makes lewd suggestions and begins to unzip his pants, Evelyn flees in a panic but decides to tell no one what has happened, hoping it was an isolated incident.

The following day, Rafe approaches Evelyn again and ruthlessly rapes her on her desk. Ashamed and fearful of the public disgrace she will suffer if she reports being violated by a black man, she chooses to remain silent. A full-fledged psychopath and sadist, Rafe forces himself upon her on a daily basis. Evelyn, in a mixture of intimidation and sexual craving, submits to the humiliating and abusive relationship, sometimes looking forward to their trysts. When Rafe forces Evelyn's body against a hot radiator during sex, her screams alert two other janitors, who enter her classroom and see what is going on. Scandal breaks loose and Evelyn faces unrelenting public ostracism. The friendly principal Havermayer is forced to ask her to resign, referring her to a new job in another town in New Jersey. Everybody turns a cold shoulder on her and she contemplates suicide. But in the end she regains herself and moves out of town to a new life.

== Cast ==
- Anne Heywood as Evelyn Wyckoff
- John Lafayette as Rafe Collins
- Donald Pleasence as Dr. Steiner
- Robert Vaughn as Dr. Neal
- Earl Holliman as Ed Eckles
- Carolyn Jones as Beth
- Ronee Blakley as Betsy
- Dorothy Malone as Mildred
- Doris Roberts as Marie
- Dana Elcar as Principal Havermeyer
- Jocelyn Brando as Mrs. Hemmings
- R.G. Armstrong as Mr. Hemmings

== Production ==
The novel was published in 1970 and described as "a modest best seller".

Film rights were bought by Raymond Stross, who had made several films starring his actress wife, Anne Heywood, notably The Fox. He was able to raise finance after the success of female-starring movies Julia and The Turning Point. Filming took place in Stockton and Los Angeles in April 1978; the majority of the film was shot in Stockton although the rape sequence was filmed on a sound stage.

It was directed by Marvin Chomsky who had just directed Roots and Holocaust for television. "It's a very emotionally charged story," said Chomsky.

Stross said it was not "his intention to make a sensational film. I see it as terrifying and poetic with strong overtones of Ingmar Bergman."

== Reception ==
=== Critical response ===
Kevin Thomas of the Los Angeles Times called the film "perfectly dreadful" and added, "In their literalness, Polly Platt's script and Marvin Chomsky's direction compound each other disastrously... Good Luck, Miss Wyckoff expresses familiar truths about the painful conflict of the individual and society—but with a persistent sense of falseness and an utter lack of style."

== Release ==
Good Luck, Miss Wyckoff was released in April 1979 in theaters in the United States and on October 27, 1979, in theaters in Japan. The film was released on VHS with these alternate titles: The Sin, The Shaming and Secret Yearnings. Good Luck, Miss Wyckoff was released on DVD and Blu-ray by Vinegar Syndrome on August 13, 2013.

FilmInk magazine wrote "We’re particularly surprised there isn’t more critical discussion over Miss Wyckoff, considering its frank content and Polly Platt authorship – there is certainly a lot going on."
