= A Terrible Beauty (1960 film) =

1960 film by Tay Garnett

A Terrible Beauty (The Night Fighters)
- U.S. poster
- Directed by: Tay Garnett
- Screenplay by: R. Wright Campbell
- Based on: A Terrible Beauty; 1958 novel by Arthur J. Roth
- Produced by: Raymond Stross; Robert Mitchum (uncredited)
- Starring: Robert Mitchum; Richard Harris; Dan O'Herlihy; Anne Heywood; Cyril Cusack
- Cinematography: Stephen Dade
- Edited by: Peter Tanner
- Music by: Cedric Thorpe Davie
- Production companies: D.R.M. Productions, Inc.
- Distributed by: United Artists
- Release date: June 17, 1960
- Running time: 90 minutes
- Countries: United Kingdom; United States
- Language: English
- Budget: £241,732

A Terrible Beauty (also known as The Night Fighters) is a 1960 drama film directed by Tay Garnett and starring Robert Mitchum, Anne Heywood, Dan O'Herlihy and Richard Harris. It was adapted from a 1958 novel of the same name written by Arthur Roth. The film was an international co-production between Mitchum's production company, D.R.M., and that of producer Raymond Stross.

== Plot ==
Dermot O'Neill is recruited into the Irish Republican Army (IRA) when a unit is formed in his Northern Ireland town during World War II. Reaction to the news is mixed; his mother is strongly against it while his father is proud. Dermot's brother Ned and sister Bella are ambivalent, but his girlfriend Neeve Donnelly ends their relationship, believing that the IRA will make a murderer of him.

Dermot and his friend Sean Reilly are selected to participate in a raid on a British armoury to steal weapons and ammunition. Don McGinnis is frustrated because, as commandant of the unit, he is too important to risk. The theft is executed perfectly.

However, their next attack, to destroy a guarded power plant in concert with a planned German invasion, results in bloodshed. In order to flee, Dermot shoots a soldier blocking the way out. Sean is wounded in the foot and Johnny Corrigan is killed. Dermot and Sean evade their pursuers and manage to cross the border to safety in the Irish Free State. Dermot returns home, leaving his friend to recuperate.

Despite Dermot's advice to avoid returning, Sean tries to sneak across the border and is captured by the police. Dermot wants to stage a rescue, but McGinnis rejects the idea. Sean is sentenced to ten years of imprisonment.

McGinnis wishes to exact revenge by attacking a police barracks. Dermot opposes this plan, as a policeman's wife and children are living there, and warns that he will inform the authorities if McGinnis does not change his mind. When McGinnis refuses to relent, Dermot tells him that he is quitting the IRA. He is beaten by IRA members, but he is saved when a police patrol arrives on the scene. Dermot executes his threat and informs the police, but without disclosing names. He is taken to stand trial as an informant.

Bella becomes concerned when her brother does not return home, so she finds Neeve and they consult Dermot's friend, a cobbler called Jimmy Hannafin, who believes that he knows what has happened. He recruits Ned to help in the rescue. Neeve refuses to be left behind, but Bella is sent home to reassure her parents. Once they find and free Dermot, guarded only by a youngster, Jimmy arranges for a friend to drive Dermot to Belfast, where he can leave the country with Neeve.

The IRA men begin searching for Dermot. McGinnis stations himself at the O'Neill home. In the darkness and driving rain, he mistakes Bella, who is wearing Dermot's coat, for Dermot and shoots her dead. He is horrified to discover that he has killed the woman whom he loves.

== Cast ==
- Robert Mitchum as Dermot O'Neill
- Richard Harris as Sean Reilly
- Anne Heywood as Neeve Donnelly
- Dan O'Herlihy as Don McGinnis
- Cyril Cusack as Jimmy Hannafin
- Niall MacGinnis as Ned O'Neill
- Marianne Benet as Bella O'Neill
- Christopher Rhodes as Tim Malone
- Harry Brogan as Patrick O'Neill
- Eileen Crowe as Mrs. Kathleen O'Neill
- Joe Lynch as Seamus
- Marie Kean as Mrs. Matia Devlin
- Geoffrey Golden as Sergeant Crawley
- Edward Golden as Johnny Corrigan
- Wilfred Downing as Quinn

== Production ==
The editor Arthur Tanner recalled that director Garnett "was an alcoholic unfortunately, although he was supposed to have been dried out... and Robert Mitchum and Richard Harris were the two principles so you can imagine there were a certain amount of problems on the picture. They were thrown out of nearly all the hotels around Dublin."

Raymond Stross and Anne Heywood fell in love and married during filming.

== Reception ==
In a contemporary review for The New York Times, critic Eugene Archer wrote: "While the nature of the material invites a penetrating examination of the mental anguish implicit in an unresolved civil revolt, the writer has not attempted to explore it in depth, and has confined himself to a surprisingly strained and superficial treatment of the theme. As a result, the dramatic structure falters after establishing a promising situation in the early reels, and a brief lapse into unconvincing melodrama at the end seriously limits the film's modest pretensions."
