= Carthage in Flames =

1960 film directed by Carmine Gallone

- Cartagine in fiamme
- Directed by: Carmine Gallone
- Written by: Duccio Tessari; Carmine Gallone; Ennio De Concini
- Based on: Carthage in Flames by Emilio Salgari
- Produced by: Carmine Gallone; Riccardo Gualino; Pierre Gurgo-Salice
- Starring: Pierre Brasseur; Daniel Gélin; Anne Heywood; José Suárez
- Cinematography: Piero Portalupi
- Edited by: Niccolò Lazzari
- Music by: Mario Nascimbene
- Production companies: Lux Film; Produzione Gallone
- Distributed by: Lux Film; Columbia Pictures (US)
- Release dates: 29 January 1960 (Italy); 18 January 1961 (US)
- Running time: 107 minutes
- Country: Italy
- Language: Italian

Carthage in Flames (Italian: Cartagine in fiamme) is a 1960 Italian historical drama film directed by Carmine Gallone and starring Pierre Brasseur, José Suárez, Daniel Gélin and Anne Heywood. It was shot at the Cinecittà Studios in Rome. The film's sets were designed by the art director Guido Fiorini. It is based on the 1908 novel of the same title by Emilio Salgari.

== Plot ==
After being wounded during the battle to defend the city of Oroscopa from the army of Massinissa, Hiram, a Carthaginian leader, is rescued and nursed back to health by the young Roman woman Fulvia, who falls in love with him.

Meanwhile, the Carthaginian Council, on Massinissa's orders, has sentenced him to exile. Carthage is threatened by the Romans, and Hiram is forced to return in secret to take away with him the woman he loves, Ophir, the daughter of Hermon, the head of the council. Ophir is also in love with Hiram, but her father has arranged for her to marry Tsour, a young Carthaginian she has known since childhood.

Fulvia has also arrived in Carthage, seeking Hiram and has fallen prisoner to Phegor, the commander of the sacred guards. Phegor is attracted to Fulvia and wants to spare her life, but the Carthaginian people, seeing her as a Roman, have decided to sacrifice her in the temple of Moloch. Hiram manages to save Fulvia, but in his attempt to also free Ophir, he is captured by Phegor.

With the help of his friends Sidone and Astarito, Hiram escapes from prison and prevents Ophir's marriage to Tsour. Hiram also regains the friendship of the leader of the mercenaries, Thala, with whom he had fought in Oroscopa. Tsour realizes the great love between Ophir and Hiram and decides not to oppose their union.

The Carthaginian Council is divided. Hiram and Tsour want to fight against the Romans, while Phegor wants to negotiate. In reality, Phegor is stalling for time because he is secretly helping the enemy to ensure a position of power after the city falls. Hermon decides to support the battle line.

Hiram, Tsour, Thala, and Asdrubale fight together in the battle of Birsa, but they are defeated by Scipione l'Emiliano, aided by the Numidian troops commanded by Gollussa.

Meanwhile, Fulvia, by yielding to Phegor, has managed to procure a ship, with which Sidone, Astarito, and Ophir, once they have retrieved the wounded Hiram from the battlefield, escape to the open sea. Carthage is set on fire. Phegor does not receive the hoped-for help from the Romans, and his house is burned down along with others. Fleeing onto the balcony, Phegor finds death embraced by Fulvia, who sacrifices her life for the love of Hiram.

Once at sea, Hiram, Ophir, and the crew of the ship watch Carthage burn.

== Cast ==
- Pierre Brasseur as Sidone
- Daniel Gélin as Phegor
- Anne Heywood as Fulvia
- Aldo Silvani as Hermon
- Ilaria Occhini as Ophir
- Paolo Stoppa as Astarito
- José Suárez as Hiram
- Terence Hill as Tsour
- Gianrico Tedeschi as Eleo
- Edith Peters as Sarepta
- Cesare Fantoni as Assian
- Erno Crisa as Asdrubal

== Production ==
Carthage in Flames was among the most expensive epic adventure films produced in Italy during the 1960s. Anne Heywood was loaned out from the Rank Organisation to make it.

== Bibliography ==
- Hughes, Howard (2011). Cinema Italiano - The Complete Guide From Classics To Cult. London - New York: I.B.Tauris. ISBN 978-1-84885-608-0.
