= The Thing of It Is... =

1967 novel by William Goldman

- First UK edition
- Author: William Goldman
- Language: English
- Publisher: Harcourt Brace (US); Michael Joseph (UK)
- Publication date: 1967
- Publication place: United States
- Followed by: Father's Day

The Thing of It Is... is a 1967 novel written by William Goldman about Amos McCracken, a 31-year-old man who has written a popular show tune and who is having marriage troubles.

It was followed by a sequel, Father's Day.

== Background ==
Goldman was inspired to write the novel by a trip he and his family took to Europe following some script doctoring work he did on the film Masquerade (1965). He was particularly influenced by visiting St Pauls Cathedral, which he thought would be a good location for a fight because it echoed, and seeing the original Jewish ghetto in Venice, which made him examine his Jewishness.

"Within three weeks of me seeing the ghetto, the book was completed", said Goldman. "That's the only time I've ever written close behind a situation. Every other time it took years and years."

== Film Adaptation ==
Goldman later described an unsuccessful attempt to turn the novel into a film in Adventures in the Screen Trade. Robert Redford expressed interest in playing Amos, so Goldman wrote a screenplay on spec. Redford said he liked it and Ulu Grosbard agreed to direct. However Butch Cassidy and the Sundance Kid then came out and Redford turned into a major star, and pulled out of the project.

Elliott Gould agreed to play the lead instead, but then Grosbard dropped out to make a film. Faye Dunaway agreed to co-star, and Mark Rydell expressed interest in directing. However Rydell wanted another writer to work on the project, which Goldman objected to and the film did not proceed.

A year later Stanley Donen expressed enthusiasm for the script and succeeded in getting interest from Robert Evans at Paramount. Mia Farrow was signed to play the female lead, but Evans was not happy with the male lead, despite James Caan and Alan Alda both wanting to do it. Eventually Farrow had to drop out but Evans agreed to make the movie if it could be turned into a vehicle for Ali MacGraw. Goldman and Donen tried but MacGraw was not happy with the script and the movie was never made.

For the film, Stephen Sondheim wrote the song "No, Mary Ann", which has been recorded several times.
