= Colin Campbell (actor) =

British actor (1937–2018)

- Born: 17 January 1937; Twickenham, Middlesex, England.
- Died: 1 March 2018 (aged 81); London, England
- Occupation: Actor
- Years active: 1950–2008
- Children: 3

Colin Campbell (17 January 1937 – 1 March 2018) was an English actor.

== Life ==
His best-known role was the lead in The Leather Boys in 1964, in which he plays a bored married man who starts hanging out with a biker friend—who, he belatedly realises, is homosexual. Campbell started off as a child actor, and played John in the 1950s BBC radio Children's Hour adaptation of Worzel Gummidge, and the title role in BBC TV's Huckleberry Finn in 1952. His stage work included appearances at the Old Vic and with the RSC. He also starred in Nuns on the Run (1990) and made many appearances on British television, including in the role of David Ashton, one of the main characters in the popular ITV drama series A Family At War which was broadcast from 1970 to 1972. Campbell's photograph appears on the cover of the German release of The Smiths' single "Ask" and, as his Leather Boys character, on the cover of The Smiths' single "William, It Was Really Nothing" (only CD version) and with co-star Rita Tushingham in the promotional video for "Girlfriend In A Coma".

He died on 1 March 2018, at the age of 81. Campbell's granddaughter is 1990s R&B singer Shola Ama.

== Filmography ==
Year	Title	Role	Notes
1964	The Leather Boys	Reggie	
1964	Saturday Night Out	Jamey	
1965	The High Bright Sun	Emile Andros	
1980	Bloody Kids	Conductor	TV movie
1983	Another Time, Another Place	Accordionist	
1985	My Beautiful Laundrette	Madame Butterfly Man	
1990	Nuns on the Run	Norm	
1990	I Bought a Vampire Motorcycle	Moped	
2007	Saxon	Snout	
