= Midas Run =

1969 film

- Film poster
- Directed by: Alf Kjellin
- Written by: Ronald Austin; James Buchanan; Berne Giler
- Produced by: Selig J. Seligman; Raymond Stross
- Starring: Richard Crenna; Anne Heywood; Fred Astaire
- Cinematography: Kenneth Higgins
- Edited by: Fredric Steinkamp
- Music by: Elmer Bernstein
- Production companies: Selmur Pictures; Motion Pictures International
- Distributed by: Cinerama Releasing
- Release date: April 30, 1969
- Running time: 106 minutes
- Country: United States
- Language: English
- Budget: $1.1 million
- Box office: $500,000

Midas Run (UK title A Run on Gold) is a 1969 American comedy film directed by Alf Kjellin and starring Richard Crenna, Anne Heywood and, in one of his final big-screen roles, Fred Astaire. It was shot at the Tirrenia Studios in Tuscany. Location shooting took place in London, Venice, Milan and Rome.

== Plot ==
Pedley, retiring from the British Secret Service, can't understand why he hasn't yet been knighted. He devises an elaborate heist of an airplane cargo consisting of gold bullion, recruiting Mike Warden, a writer of military strategies from America, although his real aim is to capture the elusive General Ferranti.

Warden travels to Italy to assume control of the scheme along with Pedley's accomplice Sylvia Giroux, with whom he soon falls in love. They pull off the heist but are soon arrested, but Pedley comes to their rescue just in time.

== Cast ==
- Richard Crenna as Mike Warden
- Anne Heywood as Sylvia Giroux
- Fred Astaire as John Pedley
- Ralph Richardson as Lord Henshaw
- Cesar Romero as Carlo Dodero
- Adolfo Celi as General Ferranti
- Maurice Denham as Charles Crittenden
- John Le Mesurier as Wells
- Jacques Sernas as Paul Giroux
- Karl-Otto Alberty as Mark Dietrich
- George Hartmann as Anton Pfeiffer
- Carolyn De Fonseca as Ingeborg Pfeiffer
- Aldo Bufi Landi as Carabiniere
- Stanley Baugh as Pilot
- Fred Astaire Jr. as Co-Pilot
- Bruce Beeby as Gordon
- Robert Henderson as The Dean
- Roddy McDowall as Wister

== Production ==
The film was one of several collaborations between producer Raymond Stross and his wife Anne Heywood. Richard Crenna claimed that Heywood had the script rewritten to suit her purposes.

== Reception ==
The film earned rentals of $300,000 in North America and $200,000 in other countries. After all costs were deducted it recorded a loss of $1,515,000.

== See also ==
- List of American films of 1969
