= I Want What I Want (novel) =

1966 novel by Geoff Brown

First edition

I Want What I Want by Geoff Brown was first published in 1966 by Great Britain's Weidenfeld & Nicolson. It was made into a film by the same title starring Anne Heywood.

The novel was republished in 2018 by Valancourt Books, with an introduction by Professor Michael Bronski.
