= Gillian Freeman =

English writer (1929–2019)

- Born: 5 December 1929; London, England
- Died: 23 February 2019 (aged 89); London, England
- Education: University of Reading
- Occupation: Writer
- Spouse: Edward Thorpe
- Children: Harriet Thorpe (daughter); Matilda Thorpe (daughter)
- Writing career
- Notable work: The Leather Boys

Gillian Freeman (5 December 1929 – 23 February 2019) was an English writer. Her first book, The Liberty Man, appeared while she was working as a secretary to the novelist Louis Golding. Her fictional diary, Nazi Lady: The Diaries of Elisabeth von Stahlenberg, 1938–48, was assumed by many to be real.

== Early life ==
Born in Maida Vale, London to Jewish parents, Dr Jack Freeman, a dentist who had been a physician, and his wife Freda (née Davids), she attended Francis Holland School in London and Lynton House school in Maidenhead during the Second World War. She graduated in English and philosophy from the University of Reading in 1951. She then taught at a school in the East End and worked as a copywriter and a newspaper reporter.

== Career ==
The Liberty Man (1955) was Freeman's first book, written while working as a literary secretary to the novelist Louis Golding; it was about a love affair between a schoolteacher and a sailor doomed by the class system. Freeman's time with Golding was said to have inspired some of her later works.

One of her best known books was the novel The Leather Boys (1961), published under the pseudonym Eliot George, after the novelist George Eliot, a story of a gay relationship between two young working-class men, one of whom is married and a biker, which was later turned into a film for which she wrote the screenplay, this time under her own name. The novel was commissioned by the publisher Anthony Blond, her literary agent, who wanted a story about a "Romeo and Romeo in the South London suburbs". Her non-fiction book The Undergrowth of Literature (1967), was a pioneering study of pornography.

The Alabaster Egg (1970) is a tragic romance about a Jewish woman set in Nazi Germany. In 1978, on another commission from Blond, she wrote a fictional diary, Nazi Lady: The Diaries of Elisabeth von Stahlenberg, 1938–48. Freeman's authorship was not at first revealed and many readers assumed it was genuine; it was included in a 2004 anthology of war diaries.

In addition to novels, Freeman wrote screenplays including That Cold Day in the Park, a 1969 film directed by Robert Altman, the scenarios for two ballets by Kenneth MacMillan, Isadora and Mayerling, and with her husband, Ballet Genius (1988), portraits of 20 outstanding ballet dancers. Her final book was But Nobody Lives in Bloomsbury (2006), a fictional study of the Bloomsbury Group.

== Private life ==
Freeman married Edward Thorpe, a novelist and the ballet critic of the Evening Standard, in 1955. The couple had two daughters, the actresses Harriet Thorpe and Matilda Thorpe.

She died in London at the Whittington Hospital on 23 February 2019 from complications of dementia.

== Works ==
=== Novels ===
- The Liberty Man, 1955; new edition 2014.
- Fall of Innocence, 1956
- Jack Would be a Gentleman, 1959
- The Leather Boys, 1961; new edition 2014; new edition 2025.
- The Campaign, 1963
- The Leader, 1965; new edition 2014.
- The Alabaster Egg, 1970
- The Marriage Machine, 1975
- Nazi Lady: The Diaries of Elisabeth von Stahlenberg, 1938–48, 1979
- An Easter Egg Hunt, 1981
- Lovechild, 1984
- Life Before Man, 1986
- Termination Rock, 1989
- His Mistress's Voice, 2000
- But Nobody Lives in Bloomsbury, 2006

=== Other ===
- The Story of Albert Einstein, 1960
- The Leather Boys (screenplay), 1964
- Only Lovers Left Alive (screenplay), 1965
- The Undergrowth of Literature, 1967
- That Cold Day in the Park (screenplay), 1969
- An Evasion of Women (short play, alongside pieces by Shena Mackay, Margaret Drabble, and Maureen Duffy), 1969
- I Want What I Want (screenplay), 1972
- The Schoolgirl Ethic: The Life and Work of Angela Brazil, 1976
- Mayerling (ballet scenario), 1978
- Intimate Letters (ballet scenario), 1978
- Isadora (ballet scenario), 1981
- Ballet Genius: Twenty Great Dancers of the Twentieth Century (with Edward Thorpe), 1988
