= Marjorie Corbett =

British actress (1912–1995)

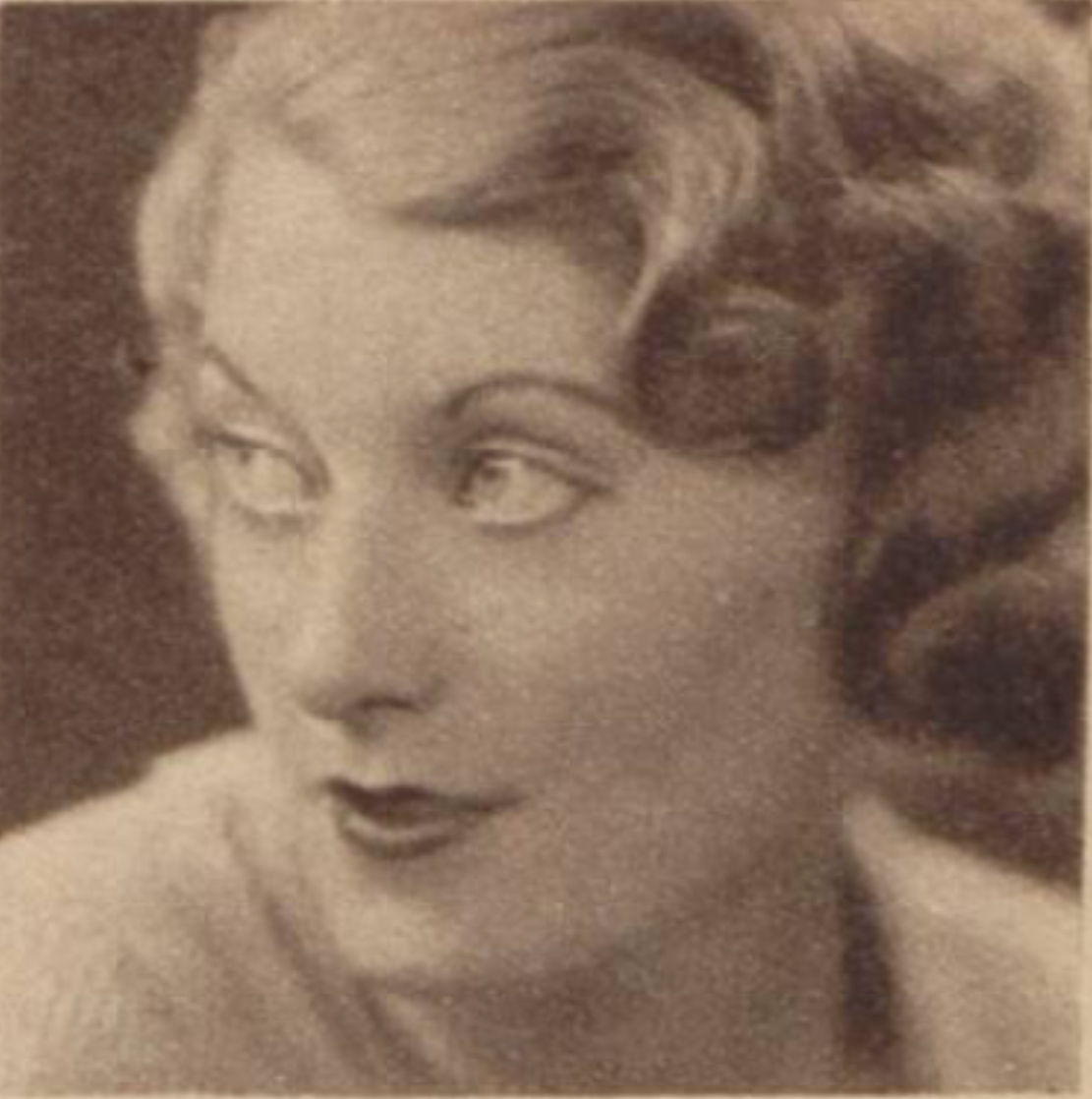
- Picturegoer, 1934
- Born: Marjorie Hodgson; 12 May 1912; London, England
- Died: 27 July 1995 (aged 83); King's Lynn, Norfolk, England
- Occupations: Actress; puppeteer
- Years active: 1932–1937 (film); 1964–1981 (TV)
- Spouse: Harry Corbett (m. 1944; died 1989)
- Children: 2, including Matthew

Marjorie Corbett (née Hodgson; 12 May 1912 – 27 July 1995) was a British actress and puppeteer. She was the wife of Sooty's creator, Harry Corbett.

== Early career ==
Corbett appeared on stage in several of the Aldwych farces. In the 1930s, she appeared in nine films, including two adaptations of the Aldwych plays. She appeared as a leading lady in quota quickies such as The Reverse Be My Lot and Michael Powell's The Price of a Song.

== Retirement and Sooty years ==
During her retirement of acting on film, Marjorie married Sooty creator Harry Corbett. She later played the original voice of Soo from The Sooty Show alongside Harry, and later his son Matthew Corbett, from 1964 until 1981. She later retired again in 1981, with her character Soo being revoiced by Brenda Longman.

== Personal life and death ==
During her performance of Soo, Marjorie was a heavy smoker, which caused Soo to sound older; Marjorie was replaced. She later retired again for 14 years until her death on 27 July 1995.

== Selected filmography ==
- Thark (1932)
- Turkey Time (1933)
- The Broken Rosary (1934)
- The Price of a Song (1935)
- Pay Box Adventure (1936)
- The Reverse Be My Lot (1937)
- Children of the Fog (1937)
- The Sooty Show - as Soo (1964–1981)

== Bibliography ==
- Wearing, J.P. The London Stage 1940-1949: A Calendar of Productions, Performers, and Personnel. Rowman & Littlefield, 2014.
