= The Heart of a Man =

1959 British film by Herbert Wilcox

- Original British poster by Nicola Simbari
- Directed by: Herbert Wilcox
- Written by: Pamela Bower; Jack Trevor Story
- Story by: Rex North
- Produced by: Anna Neagle
- Starring: Frankie Vaughan; Anne Heywood; Tony Britton; Michael Medwin
- Cinematography: Reginald H. Wyer
- Edited by: Basil Warren
- Music by: Angela Morley (as Wally Stott)
- Production company: Herbert Wilcox Productions (as Wilcox-Neagle)
- Distributed by: J. Arthur Rank Film Distributors (UK)
- Release date: 20 July 1959
- Running time: 92 minutes
- Country: United Kingdom
- Language: English

The Heart of a Man is a 1959 British drama film directed by Herbert Wilcox and starring Frankie Vaughan, Anne Heywood and Tony Britton. A millionaire in disguise gives a young man money to help him pursue his singing career.

Featured songs by Vaughan include "The Heart of a Man", "Sometime, Somewhere" and "Walking Tall".

== Plot ==
Sailor Frankie Martin is offered a thousand pounds by an eccentric tramp if he can earn a hundred pounds in a week by honest means. Frankie tries his hand as a boxer, a bouncer and a commissionaire, and finally finds success as a singer. He also falls for the charms of night club chanteuse Julie, and this leads to further success when he wins a recording contract.

== Cast ==
- Frankie Vaughan as Frankie Martin
- Anne Heywood as Julie
- Tony Britton as Tony
- Peter Sinclair as Bud
- Michael Medwin as Sid
- Anthony Newley as Johnnie
- Harry Fowler as Razor
- George Rose as Charlie
- Harold Kasket as Oscar
- Vanda Hudson as Cha Cha

== Production ==
The movie was the fourth collaboration between Frankie Vaughan and Anna Neagle, following These Dangerous Years, Wonderful Things! and The Lady Is a Square although those had been made for Associated British and this one was made for Rank. The movie featured two Rank contract stars, Anne Heywood and Tony Britton.

Filming started 19 January 1959 under the title Give Me the Moonlight. "We aren't fighting television," said Herbert Wilcox. "We are fighting hooligans in the cinema audience. You can't play a sensitive love scene today because it gets a laugh. But we're beating them. I turn a love scene to comedy and get in with the laugh first."

Wilcox also said "The important thing is that it is upbeat. We insist on that in everything that we do. Whether the story is in a Liverpool gambling den or a Park Lane penthouse. Downbeat subjects encourage the hooligans. They sneer at the situations. They guy the love scenes. They throw things. People say television is killing the cinema. They forget hooliganism. Together they are a frightening team."

The Rank Organisation issued a single sung by Anne Heywood in the film on its record label.

Mike Pratt and Lionel Bart wrote songs for the film.

== Critical reception ==
Variety wrote the film "is shrewdly designed to exploit [Vaughn's] growing stature as a film star. But, wisely, Miss Neagle has not put all her eggs in the Vaughan basket. She has assembled a very sound cast around him. Result is an amiable romantic comedy, with three pop songs injected for good measure."

The Monthly Film Bulletin wrote: "It has long been almost axiomatic that the British cannot make musicals. One might therefore expect that a producer as experienced in the entertainment business as Anna Neagle would know how to avoid the more obvious pitfalls. But apparently not, for she remains content to cling to the outworn conventions; moreover she has chosen a script whose witlessness and banality make it almost a parody of the worst British comedies of the Thirties. It abandons all pretensions to plot after the first half-hour and becomes simply a series of unrelated incidents. Frankie Vaughan looks self-conscious throughout, and Anne Heywood struggles vainly against the most hideous costumes and hair-styles that she has ever had to wear. Tony Britton brings off the considerable feat of making his material sound witty; in fact his whole performance has a style and polish that can only expose the inadequacy of his fellow artists. There are several good "pop" songs, but they are presented so tamely that it is hard to believe that the director is the veteran Herbert Wilcox. He has, in the past, shown a keen awareness of popular taste, but this time he may find that he has overestimated the tolerance of his audience."

Kinematograph Weekly wrote "The script, flecked by whimsy, lacks originality, but at least the "corn bin" is full to the brim. Moreover, its popular players, headed by Frankie Vaughan, dish it out for all they're worth against widely varied backgrounds to the accompaniment of a catchy signature tune."

In the Radio Times, David Parkinson gave the film two out of five stars, and wrote, "Veteran director Herbert Wilcox bowed out of films with this undistinguished and wholly unconvincing slice-of-life drama, which was produced by his actress wife Anna Neagle ... Anthony Newley cashes in on a showy supporting role and Vaughan scored a chart hit with the title song."

In British Sound Films: The Studio Years 1928–1959 David Quinlan rated the film as "mediocre", writing: "Dated vehicle for Vaughn; the title song was a big hit."

In April 1959 it was reported Vaughan and Anna Neagle would make another film, where Neagle would play Mrs. Bruselmans, a Belgian woman who played "a heroic undercover role in Brussels during the war". In June 1959 Vaughan announced he would make a film for Wilcox and Neagle where he played a GI in Rome who befriends a wait. However the film was never made.
