= The Leather Boys (novel) =

1961 novel by Gillian Freeman

- 1966 Four Square Books edition cover
- Author: Gillian Freeman
- Language: English
- Genre: Gay literature; Psychological thriller
- Publisher: Anthony Blond
- Publication date: 1961
- Publication place: United Kingdom
- Media type: Print (hardcover)
- Pages: 176

The Leather Boys is a 1961 novel by British author Gillian Freeman. It is set in the ton-up boy rocker subculture in London and tells the story of a gay relationship between two young working-class men, one married and a biker, the other who lives with his ailing grandmother. The Leather Boys was originally published by Anthony Blond under the pseudonym of Eliot George because of its controversial themes.

The novel was adapted into the 1964 British drama film The Leather Boys.

== Plot ==
Friends through their involvement in a motorcycle gang, Dick supports his ailing grandmother with money from their thefts, and Reggie is looking to escape his unhappy marriage. They are "leather boys", working-class London teens with an affinity for motorcycles and leather jackets. Reggie leaves his unfaithful wife Dot and moves in with Dick, and the men soon realize they are more than just friends.

== Development and publication ==
The novel was commissioned by the publisher Anthony Blond, Freeman's literary agent, who wanted a story about a "Romeo and Romeo in the South London suburbs". The result was a story of a gay relationship between two young working-class men, one married and the other a biker. It is explicit about the sexual relationship between Reggie and Dick, and about the possibility that Dot is pregnant by another man. It also portrays their gang as a criminal network, and ends with a botched robbery.

1961 Anthony Blond first edition cover, with the pseudonym Eliot George

The Leather Boys was originally published by Anthony Blond in 1961 under the pseudonym of Eliot George because of its controversial themes. It was reprinted under Freeman's name several times, most recently by Valancourt Books in 2013, with a new introduction by English writer Michael Arditti.

== Adaptation ==
The novel was adapted into the 1964 British drama film The Leather Boys, for which Freeman wrote the screenplay and was credited with her real name. The plot was changed considerably for the film, in which Dick is renamed "Pete", and only he is gay. Reggie is still unhappy in his marriage, but spurns Pete's romantic advances. Film critic Richard L. Coe wrote that "Understatement has made this story meaningful; overstatement would have made it merely sensational." The film was nominated for a Golden Globe Award for Best English-Language Foreign Film in 1966.

== Reception and impact ==
In his introduction to the Valancourt edition, Arditti argued that the novel and film "played a vital part in liberalising British attitudes towards homosexuality." It was the first novel to focus on love between young working-class men rather than aristocrats.
