= The Leather Boys =

1964 British film by Sidney J. Furie

- UK DVD cover
- Directed by: Sidney J. Furie
- Written by: Gillian Freeman
- Based on: The Leather Boys (1961 novel) by Gillian Freeman
- Produced by: Raymond Stross
- Starring: Rita Tushingham; Colin Campbell; Dudley Sutton
- Cinematography: Gerald Gibbs
- Edited by: Reginald Beck
- Music by: Bill McGuffie
- Production company: Raymond Stross Productions; Viewfinder Film Productions
- Distributed by: British Lion-Columbia
- Release date: 23 January 1964
- Running time: 107 minutes
- Country: United Kingdom
- Language: English
- Budget: £106,271; (Gross)

The Leather Boys is a 1964 British kitchen sink drama film directed by Sidney J. Furie, adapted by Gillian Freeman from her 1961 novel. It stars Rita Tushingham, Colin Campbell, and Dudley Sutton. The story is set in the early 1960s following the ton-up boy rocker subculture in London and features a gay motorcyclist.

The film is notable as an early example of a film that violated the Hollywood production code, yet was still shown in the United States, as well as being an important film in the genre of queer cinema. An example of British kitchen sink realism, its treatment of homosexuality was considered daring at the time of its release.

The film was released in the UK by British Lion-Columbia on 23 January 1964. The Leather Boys was nominated for Best English-Language Foreign Film at the 23rd Golden Globes.

== Plot ==
Working-class cockney teenagers Dot and biker Reggie get married. Their marriage soon turns sour. During an unsuccessful honeymoon at a holiday camp, Reggie becomes alienated from the brassy, self-absorbed Dot. Afterwards, they begin to live increasingly separate lives as Reggie becomes more involved with his biker friends, especially the eccentric Pete. Reggie also loses interest in having sex with Dot.

When Reggie's grandfather dies, Dot merely complains that his support for his bereaved grandmother has stopped them visiting the cinema. Her boorish behaviour at the funeral and her refusal to move in with Reggie's grandmother leads to a major argument. She leaves, and Reggie stays with his grandmother, who will not leave her own house. He brings in Pete, who has been forced to leave his lodgings, to stay as a lodger with her. The two share a bed at her house. Meanwhile, Dot shows an interest in Brian, another biker. The following day, Pete and Reggie drive to the seaside. Reggie wants them to chat up a couple of girls, but Pete shows no interest.

Reggie intends to return to Dot, who has hatched a plan to get him back by pretending to be pregnant. Dot is sitting with Brian when she tells Reggie of her "pregnancy". Believing he cannot be the father, Reggie accuses Brian, and the two fight. Dot visits the house of Reggie's grandmother and learns that he is sharing a bed with Pete. She taunts them, calling them "queers". Reggie is disturbed by this, and asks Pete to deny that he is homosexual, but Pete avoids answering.

The bikers organise a race from London to Edinburgh and back in which Reggie, Pete and Brian all take part. Dot rides with Brian. When Brian's bike breaks down, Reggie carries Dot on his. Dot admits she is not pregnant. The two start to rekindle their relationship. When they get back, Pete manages to separate Reggie from Dot, taking him to the pub. They come back to their room drunk. When Pete passes out, Reggie sits up thinking. The following morning, he decides to return to Dot. Pete gets upset, and says he cannot understand why Reggie would want to return to Dot because they get on so much better. He says they should go to America together. Reggie says that he needs a woman. He returns to Dot, but discovers her in bed with Brian. In despair, he meets with Pete and says he wishes to leave for America as soon as possible. Pete says he can get them passage working on a ship.

While Pete is arranging things, he leaves Reggie in a pub in Silvertown near the Royal Docks, which turns out to be a gay pub. Reggie realises when one of the clientele starts chatting him up. When Pete enters, they all recognise him, and Reggie suddenly understands that Pete is gay. He leaves.

== Cast ==
- Rita Tushingham as Dot
- Colin Campbell as Reggie
- Dudley Sutton as Pete
- Gladys Henson as Gran
- Avice Landone as Reggie's mother
- Lockwood West as Reggie's father
- Betty Marsden as Dot's mother
- Martin Matthews as Uncle Arthur
- Johnny Briggs as Brian
- James Chase as Les
- Geoffrey Dunn as Mr. Lunnis
- Dandy Nichols as Mrs. Stanley
- Carmel McSharry as Bus conductress

== Production ==
The film is based on the 1961 novel The Leather Boys, commissioned by the London literary agent and publisher Anthony Blond, who suggested that Gillian Freeman write about a "Romeo and Romeo in the South London suburbs". Freeman published the novel using the pseudonym Eliot George, but she is credited under her own name for the screenplay "based on the novel of Eliot George". The novel is explicit about the sexual relationship between Reggie and Pete, and about the possibility that Dot is pregnant by another man. It also portrays their gang as a criminal network, and ends with a botched robbery. The plot was changed considerably for the film, in which only Pete is gay, and there is no criminal activity.

Rita Tushingham said much of the dialogue was improvised after the actors complained that the script "was nothing like how the youth living in London spoke at the time".

Locations include the Ace Cafe and the Tidal Basin Tavern in Silvertown, East London.

The 27th February 1964 edition of UK magazine, Motor Cycle reported that Triumph Engineering refused to supply motorcycles for the film in view of the subject matter. Instead, the magazine reported that used motorcycles were utilised, the film "thereby, probably, gaining in authenticity".

== Reception ==
=== Critical response ===
Kinematograph Weekly called the film a "money maker" at the British box office for 1964 and in a review said the film was "an excursion into the coarse world of 'ton-up' boys and 'caffs' and how one young man's marriage never gets into gear. The story ... is sordid and at times very noisy, but the drama fades away to a weak, inconclusive conclusion".

John Seelye for Film Quarterly wrote: "The attempt to use the cycles symbolically, and to jazz up the visuals in the race to Edinburgh, comes off lamely; it is only in the interiors, where he can play the characters against the seedy homeyness of working-class England, that Furie comes near a style".

Variety reviewed the film as: "Salty mean-street melodrama, delivered with vigor that helps to disguise a flabby story-line." Peter Harcourt wrote in Sight and Sound: "By the end of the film we are left with the sense of having taken part in most personal experience. It is this personal quality, this sense of intimacy, which, finally, is the achievement of Sidney Furie as a director." Leslie Halliwell opined: "Sharply-observed slice of low life which now seems quite dated, the central figures no longer being of the ‘heroic’ interest given them at the time. Technically the film is tediously and fashionably flashy".

The Radio Times Guide to Films gave the film 3/5 stars, writing:

"Nearly 50 years on, it's almost impossible to see why this was once regarded as an unacceptably frank insight into the gay lifestyle. Colin Campbell is so hopelessly out of his depth as the young newlywed wrestling with his sexual identity that not even the excellence of Rita Tushingham and Dudley Sutton can salvage what were intended to be powerful scenes. Sidney J. Furie's film is now something of a quaint period piece, full of techniques borrowed from the French New Wave. The end result is fussy and flash, but the wedding and the Butlin's sequences are priceless relics of 1960s life".

=== Awards and nominations ===
The film was nominated for a Golden Globe Award for Best English-Language Foreign Film in 1966, losing to the British romantic drama film Darling.
