= The Reverse Be My Lot =

1937 film by Raymond Stross

- Directed by: Raymond Stross
- Starring: Ian Fleming; Marjorie Corbett; Mickey Brantford
- Production company: Joe Rock Productions
- Release date: 1938
- Running time: 67 minutes
- Country: United Kingdom
- Language: English

The Reverse Be My Lot is a 1937 British drama film directed by Raymond Stross and starring Ian Fleming, Marjorie Corbett and Mickey Brantford. The film is based on a novel by Margaret Morrison. It was made as a quota quickie.

== Preservation status ==
The British Film Institute National Archive holds no stills or ephemera, and no film or video materials.

== Plot ==
Harley Street physician Dr. Murray has discovered an anti-influenza drug, and unemployed actress Margaret Crichton offers to be his first test subject. He falls in love with her, and when he fails to administer the drug, Margaret takes matters into her own hands and injects herself. Murray finds her semi-conscious and saves her life, then misinterpreting her gratitude for love. He writes a letter to his wife asking for a divorce, but soon discovers that it is his son Ralph that Margaret loves. He destroys the letter before his wife can read it.

== Cast ==
- Ian Fleming as Doctor Murray
- Marjorie Corbett as Margaret Crichton
- Mickey Brantford as Ralph
- Georgie Harris as George
- Jack Hellier as Jackie
- Helen Goss as Helen
- Audrene Brier as Bubbles
- Aubrey Mallalieu as Doctor Davidson

== Reception ==
Kine Weekly wrote: "Marriage and medicine provide most of the complications in this film, which is hardly strong enough in either of its two phases to make convincing drama. ... An air of unreality hangs over most of the acting, due no doubt to the artificiality of the story. Fleming makes as much as possible of the indeterminate character of the doctor, and Marjorie Corbett does her best to make the actress a real, live human being. But their efforts count for little in the task of putting over such stagey material."

The Daily Film Renter wrote: "Novelettish theme fails to convince, while undue padding detracts from main issue. Acting, dialogue and direction adequate for story's demands. Quota fare for the uncritical."
