= Violent Playground =

1958 film by Basil Dearden

- Original UK quad poster by Cliff Hirstle
- Directed by: Basil Dearden
- Written by: James Kennaway
- Produced by: Michael Relph; Earl St. John (executive producer)
- Starring: Stanley Baker, Anne Heywood, David McCallum, Peter Cushing,
- Cinematography: Reginald H. Wyer; Reg Johnson (exteriors)
- Edited by: Arthur Stevens
- Music by: Philip Green
- Production company: The Rank Organisation
- Release date: 1958
- Running time: 108 min.
- Country: United Kingdom
- Language: English

Violent Playground is a black and white 1958 British film directed by Basil Dearden and starring Stanley Baker, Peter Cushing, and David McCallum. It was written by James Kennaway.

The film, which deals with the subject of juvenile delinquency, has an explicit social agenda. It owes much to U.S. films of a similar genre. McCallum's character, in particular, references roles played by James Dean, Marlon Brando, and especially Vic Morrow in Blackboard Jungle. Rock 'n' roll is presented as a negative influence. In a memorable scene, music appears to put the youths into a trance-like state, culminating in McCallum leading a menacing advance on Baker's character.

Many of the poor working-class subjects of the film are from Liverpool's sizeable Irish-descended community. Notably, two important characters are Chinese. Despite its Liverpool setting no major character speaks with a Merseyside accent in this film. The tough inner-city estates are represented as a breeding ground for youth crime. The success rate of Liverpool's juvenile liaison officers is lauded in the prologue.

== Plot ==
The initial scenes introduce the various miscreant young children who are to appear in the final classroom siege.

A series of arson attacks are taking place across the city, with metal laundry tags being found at each scene.

The film focuses on a Liverpool street gang led by Johnny Murphy. When local juvenile liaison officer Sergeant Truman visits the Murphy household he becomes romantically involved with Johnny's sister. He also finds considerable points of similarity between his previous investigations into the activities of an arsonist known as the "Firefly" and his investigation of Johnny Murphy. Cushing plays a local priest attempting to heal the social problems of the locality.

The Chinese boy Alexander is knocked down and accidentally run over by Johnny stealing and driving Alexander's and his sister Primrose's laundry van at high speed trying to get away from the police, after being caught trying to set fire to a local hotel. Alexander is pronounced dead.

In a final sequence prescient of more recent school shootings, Murphy holds a classroom full of children hostage with a machine-gun, taunting the police on the ground below. A crowd of parents starts to gather as Johnny gets the kids to shout out their names one by one. The priest confronts Johnny. The police put a ladder to the Wall and Johnny gets young David Caplin to tell them to back off. The priest starts climbing the ladder. Johnny pushes the ladder off the building injuring the priest. In a stand off with the police Johnny shoots one of the young girl students. Cathy is sent in alone to speak to Johnny. She tells Johnny if they do not get the girl to hospital she will die. The children are released leaving just Cathy and Johnny. Johnny is arrested and Cathy feels betrayed as the police had said he would not be. Two final children are not collected: Johnny's young twin siblings. The headmaster takes care of them.

The sergeant drives Cathy home and asks her out but she declines. She kisses his hand with gratitude.

== Cast ==
- Stanley Baker – Detective Sergeant Jack Truman
- Anne Heywood – Catherine 'Cathie' Murphy
- David McCallum – Johnnie Murphy
- Peter Cushing – priest
- John Slater – Detective Sergeant Willie Walker
- Clifford Evans – Heaven
- Moultrie Kelsall – Superintendent
- George A. Cooper – Chief Inspector
- Brona Boland – Mary Murphy
- Fergal Boland – Patrick Montgomery Murphy
- Michael Chow – Alexander
- Tsai Chin – Primrose
- Sean Lynch – Slick
- Bernice Swanson – Meg (as Benice Swanson)
- Freddie Starr – Tommy (as Fred Fowell)
- Sheila Raynor – Mrs. Catlin
- Christopher Cooke – David Catlin
- Irene Arnold – Mrs. Baker
- Oonagh Quinn – Jilly Baker
- Melvyn Hayes – kid in Johnnie's gang (uncredited)

== Production ==
The film was the first leading role in an "A" picture for Anne Heywood. It was once known as Firefly.

The lead went to Stanley Baker. He said "The script is very exciting. It has the same kind of quality as The Blackboard Jungle. ”

The film was shot on location in Gerard Gardens in Liverpool. Some interior scenes were shot at Pinewood Studios, and the school scenes were shot at St Mary and St Michael School, Sutton Street, Stepney, London E1.

It played throughout Europe on its initial release, but failed to break into the US market, where a glut of similar films was being produced. The film began airing on local US television stations in mid-1960, and the film aired sporadically throughout the decade. It was, however, given additional theatrical showings in England in 1964–65 to cash in on both its Liverpool background, after the city became famous for being the home of The Beatles, and McCallum's global popularity as Illya Kuryakin in The Man from U.N.C.L.E.

== Critical reception ==
In a contemporary review, The Monthly Film Bulletin wrote: "The screenplay is stiff and lifeless, relying on false banter and stagy recrimination scenes," with the reviewer concluding that, "It is very sad that such a wonderful opportunity to make a true to life film on such an important theme has been allowed, once again, to slip away".

Variety gave the film a positive review.

Sight and Sound said that the film "seems a sadly wasted opportunity: a highly experienced director and a young writer, approaching a topical subject of real potentialities, have found in it mainly the familiar material for melodrama."

The Manchester Guardian's reviewer wrote: "Violent Playground, a not too clinical study of adolescent crime and its environment, has many of the ingredients of a very good film. Its story is well-planned, moral and exciting. The dialogue is intelligent, and the filming, against the background of Liverpool's streets, blitz sites, and teeming blocks of municipal flats is lively and imaginative. Much of the acting, too, is unusually impressive. But so much that is good makes one ungratefully greedy for the extra subtleties of characterisation that would have turned this into a first-rate film."

BFI Screenonline wrote, "It's hard to deny its rousing effectiveness as a high-powered melodrama".

Filmink praised the "electrifying performance from David McCallum" and location work but felt there were story problems, arguing if the movie "had focused on McCallum’s character, this would have been a beloved teen crime classic, but like so many Ealing (and Rank) films, it gets weighed down by the tut-tutting “wisdom” of its middle-aged characters (cop, priest, teacher). The film also may have been more popular had it tackled its social issues within a murder mystery plot – this was the technique Relph and Dearden would later use to great success in Sapphire and Victim. Still, it is worth seeing for McCallum and the Liverpool setting."

TV Guide noted, "A tautly scripted effort is given a realistic bent through the atmospheric photography and the subtle handling of the children."

The Radio Times Guide to Films gave the film 2/5 stars, calling film: "a drearily predictable but well-handled slice of dour realism."

In British Sound Films: The Studio Years 1928–1959 David Quinlan rated the film as "average", writing: "Social conscience thriller doesn't bite deep enough."

Leslie Halliwell said: "'Realistic' melodrama satotaged by an entirely schematic and predicatable plot; enervatingly dull until the siege climax."
