= The Very Edge =

1963 British film by Cyril Frankel

- Original British quad poster
- Directed by: Cyril Frankel
- Written by: Leslie Bricusse; Vivian Cox
- Produced by: Raymond Stross
- Starring: Anne Heywood; Richard Todd; Jack Hedley; Jeremy Brett
- Cinematography: Robert Huke
- Edited by: Max Benedict
- Music by: David Lee
- Distributed by: British Lion Film Corporation
- Release date: 30 April 1963 (UK)
- Running time: 90 minutes
- Country: United Kingdom
- Language: English

The Very Edge is a 1963 British drama film directed by Cyril Frankel and starring Anne Heywood, Richard Todd, Jack Hedley, Jeremy Brett and Maurice Denham. It was written by Leslie Bricusse and Vivian Cox. A young woman is assaulted and stalked by a maniac.

It was one of a series of films producer Raymond Stross made starring his wife Heywood.

== Plot ==
Happily married couple Tracey and architect Geofrey are expecting their first child, when, one fateful day, a maniac breaks into their home and assaults Tracey, causing her subsequent miscarriage. Initially unable to cope with life after the attack, Tracey is unresponsive to her husband, and her great trauma does not heal easily.

Even after moving home, taking a holiday, and showing his wife every consideration, the strain of waiting for a second attack by the obsessive stalker, and his wife's continuing frigidity, tempts Geoffrey to start an affair with his secretary, who's confessed to falling in love with him whilst supporting him after becoming his secretary, and during his wife's hospitalisation. In the meantime, Scotland Yard detective McInnes has been unable to find the psychopath responsible for the assault, and Tracey's safety is still in question as she is constantly stalked by the criminal.

== Cast ==
- Anne Heywood as Tracey Lawrence
- Richard Todd as Geoffrey Lawrence
- Jack Hedley as McInnes
- Nicole Maurey as Helen
- Jeremy Brett as Mullen, the intruder
- Barbara Mullen as Doctor Crawford
- Maurice Denham as Shaw
- William Lucas as Inspector Davies
- Gwen Watford as Sister Holden
- Patrick Magee as Simmonds

== Production ==
Filming took place at Ardmore Studios in Dublin and in London. Producer Raymond Stross developed the project as a vehicle for his wife Anne Heywood, and they approached Richard Todd to star (he had just made Don't Bother to Knock (1961) with the same director, Cyril Frankel.) Richard Todd recalls filming as "a happy unit".

== Critical reception ==
The Monthly Film Bulletin wrote: "There may be the germ of an idea in this unbelievable melodrama, but playing and production have destroyed any chance of giving it life. Conceived in cliché, it is an advertising man's (well photographed) dream, with all the O.K. gadgets of modern super-Span living. This would not have been a reproach if treated properly, but as used here it merely illustrates the essential shallowness in attitude and contempt for its audience which run right through the film. Faults in conception are not helped by the general superficiality of the performances, but there are some touches which hint at better things. Anne Heywood makes Tracey believable, and her scenes with the little girl down the road are charming and naturally played. Terror of violence from the under-privileged intruding into a carefree, secure life is lurking at the back of the film, and it would only have needed a little more integrity and artistry to turn the film from an insult to audience intelligence into an interesting piece of cinema."

The Radio Times noted, "Another British cheapie that hoped to lure audiences into auditoriums with the sort of sensationalist story they devoured in their Sunday papers".

TV Guide called it "An effectively handled psychodrama."

Movie Magazine International wrote, "The intriguing element about The Very Edge, under Cyril Frankel's assured direction, was that Tracey Lawrence had more of a psychic bond with her attacker than she did with her own husband. ... She had a compassion for his illness and she was, ironically, less of a victim around Mullen than she was around Geoffrey. ... Brett was riveting as the tortured psycho..."

Sky Movies wrote, "Producer Raymond Stross put his wife Anne Heywood through her most strenuous acting test to date when he and Leslie Bricusse thought up this dramatic thriller ... The plot bears a strong resemblance to the previous year's Return of a Stranger [1961] with John Ireland, although that didn't have the benefit of the distinguished supporting cast here."
