= The Price of a Song =

1935 film

- Production still of Marjorie Corbett and Gerald; Fielding in The Price of a Song
- Directed by: Michael Powell
- Written by: Michael Barringer
- Story by: Anthony Gittins
- Produced by: Michael Powell
- Starring: Campbell Gullan; Marjorie Corbett; Gerald Fielding
- Cinematography: James Wilson
- Distributed by: Fox British
- Release date: 7 October 1935 (UK)
- Running time: 67 minutes
- Country: United Kingdom
- Language: English

The Price of a Song is a lost 1935 British crime film, directed by Michael Powell and starring Campbell Gullan, Marjorie Corbett and Gerald Fielding. It was written by Michael Barringer from a story by Anthony Gittins and is one of 23 quota quickies Powell directed between 1931 and 1936.

== Preservation status ==
The British Film Institute has classed The Price of a Song as a lost film, included in its "75 Most Wanted" list. The BFI National Archive holds a collection of ephemera and stills but no film or video materials.

== Plot ==
Impecunious bookmaker's clerk Arnold Grierson, seeing a way to easy money, forces his daughter Margaret to marry wealthy but obnoxious songwriter Nevern, ignoring her romance with local newspaper editor Michael Hardwick. Soon after the wedding, Grierson requests the loan of a significant sum of money from Nevern and is furious and humiliated to be flatly turned down. He begins to make elaborate plans to murder Nevern on the assumption that Margaret will then inherit her husband's estate. Meanwhile, the desperately unhappy Margaret has rekindled her relationship with Hardwick. Nevern finds them in a café together and causes a public scene. Margaret determines that her only course of action is to divorce Nevern, a prospect which horrifies her father.

Nevern is in the process of composing a new song, and lodges a draft manuscript with his publisher. Making sure he has set up a foolproof alibi, Grierson goes to Nevern's house and kills him as he is finalising his new composition. As he leaves through one door, Hardwick, intending to ask Nevern to divorce Margaret, arrives through another. Hardwick finds the body and alerts the police, who in the circumstances do not believe his story and arrest him on suspicion of murder.

The interested parties later gather at Nevern's home to hear the reading of the will. Margaret is declared the sole inheritor of all her husband's money and assets, to the delight of her father. He is so happy that he begins to whistle, and gives himself away because it is Nevern's finished composition, which he could only have heard by being in the house on the night of the murder.

== Cast ==
- Campbell Gullan as Arnold Grierson
- Marjorie Corbett as Margaret Nevern
- Gerald Fielding as Michael Hardwick
- Dora Barton as Letty Grierson
- Eric Maturin as Nevern
- Charles Mortimer as Oliver Bloom
- Oriel Ross as Elsie
- Henry Caine as Stringer
- Sybil Grove as Mrs. Bancroft
- Felix Aylmer as Graham

== Critical reception ==
Kine Weekly wrote: "The skeleton plot of this crime drama has ingenuity, but unfortunately neither the cast nor the producer exercises the imagination necessary to get the best out of it. There are a number of neat twists, but slow, clumsy development kills much of the theme's inherent cleverness. Although popular entertainment is to be found in the picture, its quality is such that it is unable to rise above the second feature category. Moderate supporting feature for the masses."

The Daily Film Renter wrote: "Drama of murder in small seaside town. Events and motives leading to killing are interestingly explored through well-varied and maintained characterisations. Provincial town atmosphere is convincingly suggested, with realistic domestic interiors. Story somewhat involved, with occasional side issues that have little bearing on theme, but intrinsic merit of main idea should hold audiences. Useful, sincerely narrated second feature."

Picture Show wrote, "Campbell Gullan as the murderer is good. Gerald Fielding as the journalist plays the part with confidence, and Marjorie Corbett as the daughter of the murderer gives an attractive performance. Entertaining."

Picturegoer wrote: "Something could have been made of the plot in this picture, for it has ingenuity of idea, but neither the treatment nor the acting get the best out of it. ... Acting is weak and the suspense is spoiled by rather clumsy production."
