= Harriet Thorpe =

English actress (born 1957)

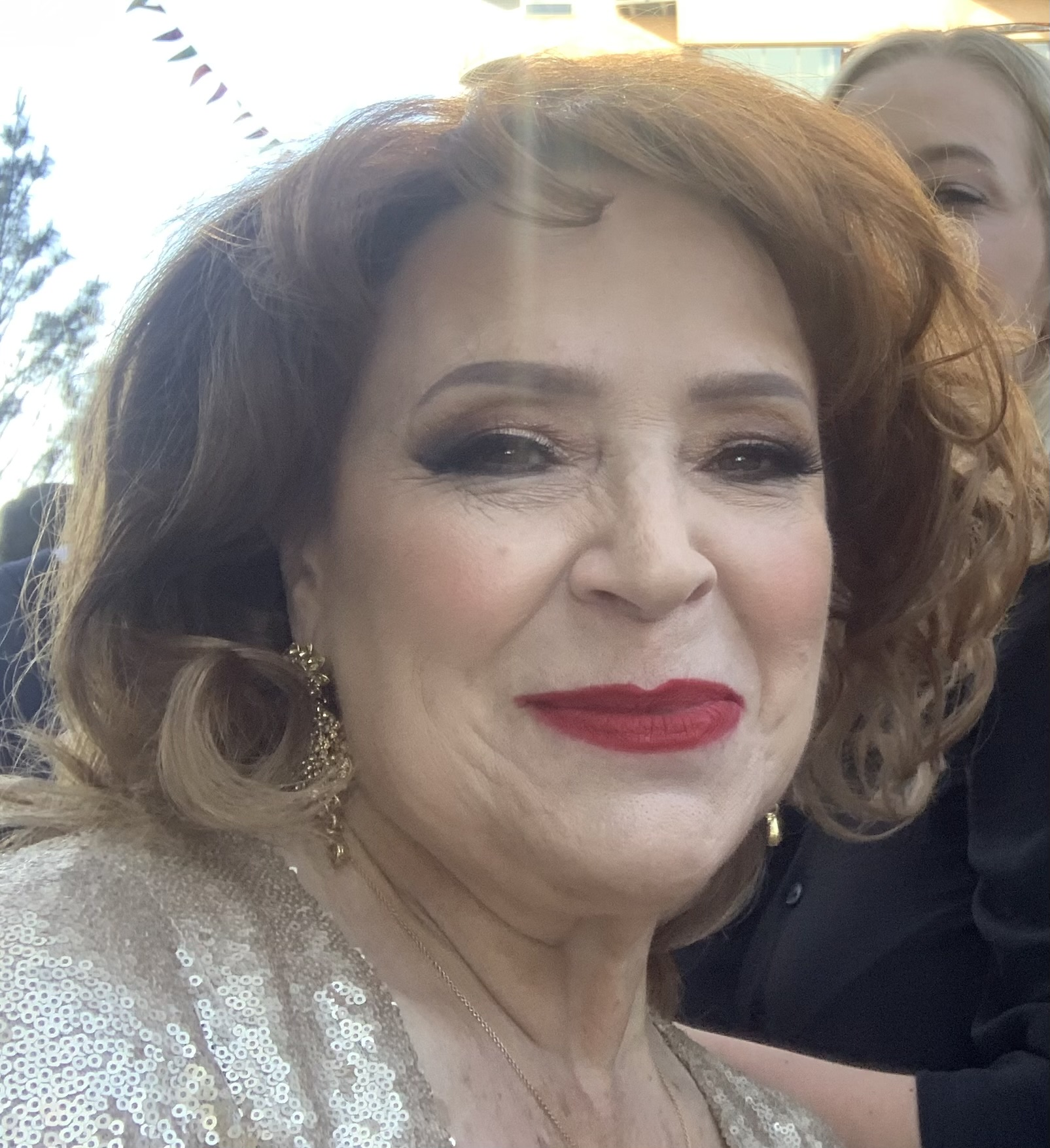
- Thorpe in 2023
- Born: Harriet Amelia Thorpe; 8 June 1957 (age 69); Hampstead, London, England
- Occupation: Actress
- Years active: 1984–present
- Spouse: Howard Baker (1989)
- Children: 2
- Parent: Gillian Freeman; Edward Thorpe
- Relatives: Matilda Thorpe (sister)

Harriet Amelia Thorpe (born 8 June 1957) is an English actress. Thorpe trained at London's Central School of Speech and Drama. She is known for her roles in the British sitcoms The Brittas Empire (1991–1997) and Absolutely Fabulous (1992–2012), and has also starred in the West End musicals Cabaret (2006), Wicked (2008) and Mamma Mia! (2010). In 2023, she took over the role of Elaine Peacock in the BBC soap opera EastEnders.

== Early life ==
Harriet Amelia Thorpe was born on 8 June 1957 in Hampstead, London. She is the daughter of Gillian (née Freeman), a writer, and Edward Thorpe, an actor and writer. Her younger sister is the actress Matilda Thorpe.

Thorpe studied dance at the Royal Ballet School and afterwards attended Royal Central School of Speech and Drama in 1979.

== Career ==
=== Television ===
She appeared in the 1990s British television sitcom The Brittas Empire, playing Carole Parkinson, the receptionist who was prone to depression and fits of emotion who permanently kept her children with her in drawers under her desk, and would sometimes be seen feeding them or washing their clothes. Thorpe also starred in a celebrity edition of The Weakest Link as Madame Morrible, in which she was voted off in the first round.

Thorpe played Fleur in Absolutely Fabulous, an eccentric and somewhat odd work-colleague. Along with working extensively with Dawn French and Jennifer Saunders, she has appeared in BBC2's Alexei Sayle's Stuff, A Bit of Fry & Laurie; BBC's Casualty, Material Girl and ITV's The Bill, Midsomer Murders and the sitcom Me, You and Him. She played Beverley Osman in the BBC children's comedy drama No Sweat, starring boyband North and South. She made a guest appearance in Channel 4 soap opera Hollyoaks as Elizabeth. In 2020, she played Nanny Ribble in an episode of Father Brown and in 2021 she guest starred in another episode of Midsomer Murders and in an episode of Doctors. In September 2021, Thorpe played Miss Newell in Endeavour.

=== Film ===
Thorpe has appeared in numerous films, such as Calendar Girls as the rather patronising and superior head of the Women's Institute; Mike Leigh's Life is Sweet; Greystoke; The Calling; and S.N.U.B.

=== Theatre ===
Thorpe has appeared on stage. She worked extensively at the Royal National Theatre, in London's West End and two Shakespeare seasons at the Regent's Park Open Air Theatre. She was in the original revival cast of Cabaret as Fraulein Kost at the Lyric Theatre in London on 22 September 2006. Prior to this, she played Mrs. Lovett in the national tour of Stephen Sondheim's Sweeney Todd: The Demon Barber of Fleet Street, originated the role of Ida Arnold in the Almeida Theatre's original musical, Brighton Rock, and played the role of Madame Thenardier in the hit musical, Les Misérables.

On 14 April 2008, she took over the role of Madame Morrible from Susie Blake in the West End production of Wicked. She played her final performance on 27 March 2010, and was replaced by Julie Legrand.

Thorpe took over the role of Tanya from Jane Gurnett in the West End production of Mamma Mia! on 14 June 2010.

She returned to the Open Air Theatre, Regent's Park to play the parts of Lottie Childs and Patricia Fodor in Timothy Sheader and Stephen Mear's revival of Crazy For You, for which she was nominated for the 2012 Theatregoers' Choice Awards.

Thorpe returned to Wicked to play Madame Morrible from Monday 22 April 2013 until Saturday 16 November 2013, in place of Louise Plowright who withdrew from the role due to illness.

In 2018, Thorpe joined the cast of Ruthless! The Musical as Miss Myrna Thorn.

=== Ambassador ===
Thorpe is an ambassador for Walk the Walk, the UK's largest grant-making breast cancer charity, and the UK's Diversity In Media Awards (DIMAS).

== Personal life ==
Thorpe is Jewish.

== Filmography ==
=== Film ===
Year	Title	Role(s)	Notes
1984	Greystoke: The Legend of Tarzan, Lord of the Apes	Iris	
1985	Morons from Outer Space	Blood Royal Lady	
1986	Foreign Body	Gucci salesgirl	
1987	Maurice	Barmaid	
1988	Young Toscanini	Comparsa	
1990	Life Is Sweet	Customer	
1995	Jack and Sarah	Small role	
2003	Calendar Girls	Brenda Mooney	
2004	Suzie Gold	Charity Silver	
2009	The Calling	Consuela	
2009	That's for Me!	Marilyn Zimmerman	
2010	S.N.U.B!	Elaine	
2010	Harry Potter and the Deathly Hallows – Part 1	Wakanda	Scene cut
2012	City Slacker	Dating Interviewer	
2015	The Lady in the Van	Customer	Scene cut
2016	Absolutely Fabulous: The Movie	Fleur	
2022	Tomorrow Morning	Joy	
2024	Fyre Rises	Gloria	

=== Television ===
Year	Title	Role(s)	Notes
1984	Who Dares Wins	Woman in Restaurant	Episode: #1.8
1985	Happy Families	Mother	Episode: "Cassie"
1985–1986	Girls on Top	Chris	2 episodes
1986	The Bill	Tarty Woman	Episode: "Loan Shark"
1986	The Comic Strip Presents...	Jane	Episode: "Consuela (Or 'The New Mrs Saunders')"
1986	Who Dares Wins	Secretary	Episode: #3.5
1986	Lenny Henry Tonite	Stephanie	Episode: "Gronk Zillman"
1987–2003	French and Saunders	Various	8 episodes
1987	The Ruth Rendell Mysteries	Anita Margolis	2 episodes
1987	The Comic Strip Presents...	Brenda	Episode: "Mr. Jolly Lives Next Door"
1988	Alexei Sayle's Stuff	Various	5 episodes
1990	A Bit of Fry & Laurie	Various	Episode: #2.3
1990	Smith and Jones	Various	Episode: #6.5
1991–1997	The Brittas Empire	Carole	All 52 episodes
1991	'Allo 'Allo!	Ethel	Episode: "Up the Crick Without a Piddle"
1991	Bottom	Wife	Episode: "Smells"
1991	Murder Most Horrid	Sarah Deveraux	Episode: "He Died a Death"
1992	The Big One	Various	Episode: "Flights of Fancy"
1992	Me, You and Him	Helen	All 6 episodes
1992–2012	Absolutely Fabulous	Fleur	13 episodes
1994	Mike and Angelo	Margaret Pinner	Episode: "Up to My Neck"
1996	Goodnight Sweetheart	Gillian	Episode: "Change Partners"
1997–1998	No Sweat	Bev Osman	13 episodes
1998	Duck Patrol	Abigail	Episode: "Occurrences"
1999	Hetty Wainthropp Investigates	Carol Singer	TV film
2000	Casualty	Hannah	Episode: "The Morning After"
2000	The 10th Kingdom	Charm Seller	Episode: #1.8
2000	Happy Birthday Shakespeare	Victoria	TV film
2000	Mirrorball	Cat Rogers	TV pilot
2002	Crossroads	Denise Hamilton	Episode: #1.285
2003	Final Demand	Mrs. Roe	TV film
2003	Casualty	Ruth	Episode: "Three in a Bed"
2003	The Bill	Anne Wilson	Episode: "Lured in to the Trap"
2004	All About Me	Ruth	Episode: "Downloading"
2006	Midsomer Murders	Elaine Trim	Episode: "Dance with the Dead"
2007	A Bucket o' French & Saunders	Various	Episode: #1.2
2007	The Life and Times of Vivienne Vyle	Journalist	Episode: #1.3
2007	The Life and Times of Vivienne Vyle	Janey Evans	Episode: "The Vivienne Vyle Show"
2008	Doctors	Clodagh Merrylees	4 episodes
2009	Victoria Wood's Mid Life Christmas	Eve Bluston	TV film
2010	Material Girl	Mimi's Mum	Episode: #1.5
2013	Doctors	Sandy Wares	Episode: "No Smoke Without Fire"
2014	The Secrets	Lynn	Episode: "The Conversation"
2015	Doctors	Dr. Chris Bassey	Episode: "Mr Charity"
2016	The Musketeers	Lady Francoise	Episode: "The Queen's Diamonds"
2017	Hollyoaks	Elizabeth	2 episodes
2017	Casualty	Raquel Kovak	Episode: #32.3
2018	Doctors	Miranda Hill	Episode: "Doctor Carter Said"
2019	Pancake	Ms. Shearer	TV pilot
2020	Father Brown	Nanny Ribble	Episode: "The Curse of the Aesthetic"
2020	Mister Winner	Sharon Winner	2 episodes
2021	Midsomer Murders	Georgie Tremayne	Episode: "The Stitcher Society"
2021	Doctors	Hattie Brooks	Episode: "Wonderland"
2021	Endeavour	Miss Newell	Episode: "Striker"
2022	The Man Who Fell to Earth	Newsie Hat	Episode: "Changes"
2022	Keep Calm & Carry On	Susan	All 4 episodes
2023	The Madame Blanc Mysteries	Flora Marshall	Episode: #2.4
2023	Pointless Celebrities	Contestant	Series 16, Episode 8
2023–present	EastEnders	Elaine Peacock	Series regular
2024	Tracey: A Day in the Life	Elaine Peacock	3 episodes
