= Anne Heywood =

British actress (1931–2023)

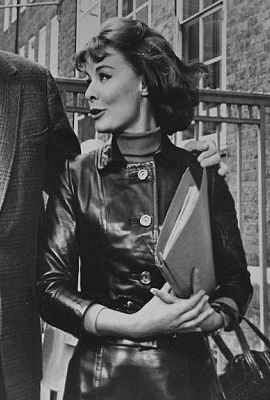
- Heywood in The Chairman (1969)
- Born: Violet Joan Pretty; 11 December 1931; Handsworth, Birmingham, England
- Died: 27 October 2023 (aged 91); Houston, Texas, U.S.
- Education: London Academy of Music and Dramatic Art
- Occupation: Actress
- Years active: 1951–1989
- Spouses: Raymond Stross (m. 1960; died 1988) George Danzig Druke (m. 1991; died 2021)
- Children: Mark Stross (b. 1963)

Anne Heywood (born Violet Joan Pretty; 11 December 1931 – 27 October 2023) was an English actress and beauty pageant titleholder. She won the title of Miss Great Britain in 1950. She was known for her long personal and professional association with producer Raymond Stross as well as playing a series of roles that broke on-screen sexual taboos, and was nominated for a Golden Globe Award for Best Actress in a Motion Picture – Drama for her performance in The Fox (1967).

== Early life and career ==
Heywood was born Violet Joan Pretty in 1931 to Harold James and Edna Elizabeth (née Lowndes) in the Handsworth area of Birmingham.

In 1947, aged 15, she joined Highbury Little Theatre in Sutton Coldfield and then won a University of Birmingham Carnival Queen competition. She then entered a National Bathing Beauty Contest and won. She won the Miss Great Britain title under her real name in 1950.

Heywood made three television appearances on the Carroll Levis TV Show and then spent four years touring UK theatres. Later she also attended the London Academy of Music and Dramatic Art.

== Career ==
=== Rank Organisation ===
She had a small role in Lady Godiva Rides Again (1951). She was then signed to the Rank Organisation, who changed her name and gave her small supporting roles in Checkpoint (1956), Find the Lady (1956), and Doctor at Large (1957). The Danziger Brothers borrowed her for the lead femme fatale in the low-budget film noir The Depraved (1957) with Robert Arden.

Rank gave Heywood the second female lead in Dangerous Exile (1957) and she was the female lead in Violent Playground (1958) with Stanley Baker, which established her as a film name. Variety wrote "Getting her first big chance, as David McCallum's elder sister, Anne Heywood shows up as one of the most promising young actresses lately to be introduced into British pix. The girl has warmth and charm and is extremely easy on the optics."

She made Floods of Fear (1958) with Howard Keel. Herbert Wilcox used her as Frankie Vaughan's leading lady in The Heart of a Man (1959), then for Rank she starred in a romantic comedy Upstairs and Downstairs (1959). In April 1959 Variety reported "Having jettisoned Belinda Lee, the Rank Organization is now pinning most of its faith to Anne Heywood. In the three or four recent releases in which she’s been given star roles this ex-beauty queen has come on apace."

In June 1959 Rank released a single from Heywood on its record label - "Love Is", which featured in The Heart of a Man.

She was loaned to an Italian company for the historical costume drama Carthage in Flames (1960).

=== Raymond Stross ===
Heywood starred in the war movie A Terrible Beauty (1960) opposite Robert Mitchum. It was produced by Raymond Stross, who married Heywood. She told the press, "The girls in English films are always blamed for being sexless but it isn't us. It's the directors. They are all nervous and inhibited about sex."

In December 1960 Heywood announced she had terminated her seven year contract with Rank, which had two years to go. "I'm fed up with playing wishy-washy good girls," she said. "I want to play women with sex appeal... I haven't made a film for over a year and I have had to turn down some wonderful offers from Hollywood and the Continent. I've got plenty of sex appeal. British films just didn't give me the chance to use it. They are written around men. No one writes good, meaty dramatic parts for girls."

Heywood starred in some British comedies, Petticoat Pirates (1961) and Stork Talk (1962) then did three films produced by Stross: The Brain (1962), The Very Edge (1963), and 90 Degrees in the Shade (1965). Stross announced a film called Angel with Heywood but it appears to have not been made.

Heywood was making High Jungle for MGM with Eric Fleming but the film was cancelled when Fleming drowned.

Heywood starred in The Fox (1967), a screen adaptation of a D. H. Lawrence novella, which was produced by Stross and co-starred Sandy Dennis and Keir Dullea. The film generated controversy at the time due to its lesbian theme and nudity from Heywood. It was also a major commercial success. A newspaper referred to her and Stross as the "English Carlo Pontis." She was signed to a four picture deal by Paramount. Heywood went to Italy to play a nun in The Lady of Monza (1969), playing The Nun of Monza, then did a movie with Richard Crenna produced by Stross, Midas Run (1969). She was second-billed in an espionage adventure film with Gregory Peck, The Chairman (1969) but she was only on screen for five minutes. She was mentioned as a possible star of Myra Breckinridge (1970), but did not appear in the final film.

=== Later career ===
Heywood starred in I Want What I Want (1972), a box-office and critical flop produced by Stross, then went to Italy for the giallo film The Killer Is on the Phone (1972) and The Nun and the Devil (1973), again as a nun. In Hollywood, she was the female lead in Trader Horn (1973), a failed remake of a 1931 classic film, then she returned to Italy for Love Under the Elms (1974).

Heywood starred in Good Luck, Miss Wyckoff (1979), produced by Stross and in the Italian satanic horror Ring of Darkness (1979). Both films were failures. She then had supporting roles in the miniseries Sadat (1983) and the science fiction film What Waits Below (1984). Her penultimate role was portraying Manon Brevard Marcel in a 1988 two-part episode, "The Mystery of Manon," of the popular US television series The Equalizer, starring fellow British actor Edward Woodward.

After the death of Stross in 1988, she retired from acting.

== Personal life ==
Heywood was married for twenty-eight years to British film producer Raymond Stross, who produced most of her films after they met in Ireland in July 1959 during the filming of A Terrible Beauty. After their marriage in Zurich, Switzerland on 12 February 1960, the couple subsequently collaborated on several British and international films, including The Brain, The Very Edge, Ninety Degrees in the Shade, The Fox, Midas Run, I Want What I Want, and Good Luck, Miss Wyckoff.

Following Stross' death in 1988, Heywood retired and never appeared on screen again. In 1991, she married her second husband, George Danzig Druke, a former Assistant Attorney General of New York State, who died on 7 October 2021 in Beverly Hills, aged 98. Heywood lived in Beverly Hills, California.

=== Death ===
Heywood died from cancer in Houston, Texas on 27 October 2023, aged 91. Her death was announced seven months later.

== Filmography ==
=== Film ===
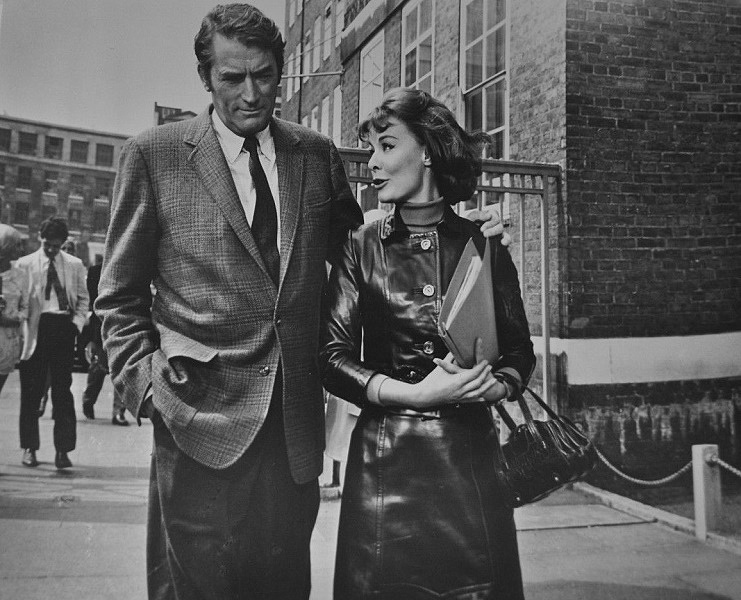
Heywood (right) and Gregory Peck (left) in The Chairman (1969).

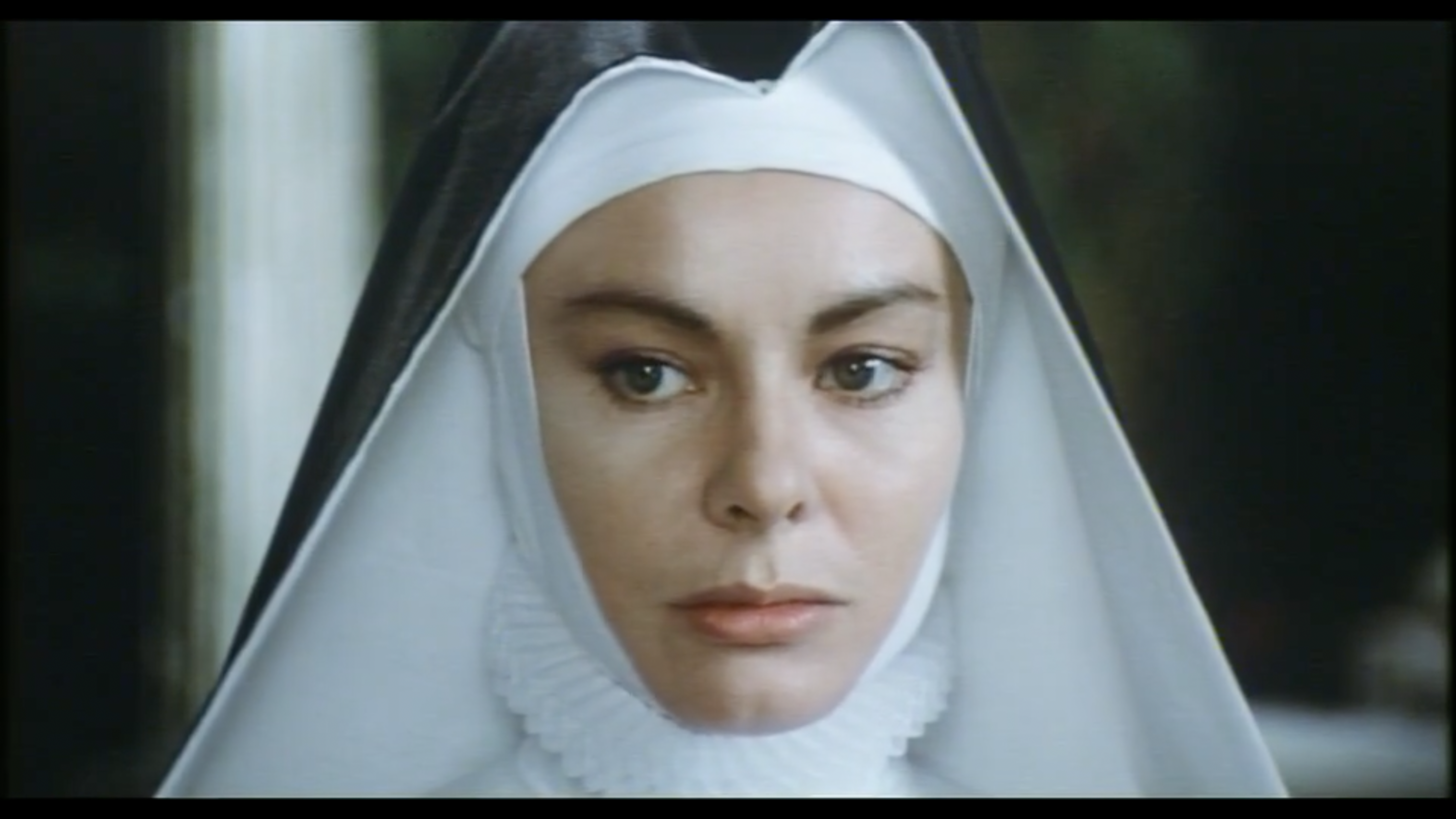
Heywood in The Nun and the Devil (1973)

Year	Title	Role	Notes
1951	Lady Godiva Rides Again	Dorothy Marlowe	as 'Violet Pretty'
1956	Find the Lady	Receptionist	
1956	Checkpoint	Gabriela	
1957	Doctor at Large	Emerald	
1957	The Depraved	Laura Wilton	
1957	Dangerous Exile	Glynis	
1958	Violent Playground	Catherine Murphy	
1959	Floods of Fear	Elizabeth Matthews	
1959	The Heart of a Man	Julie	
1959	Upstairs and Downstairs	Kate	
1960	Carthage in Flames	Fulvia	
1960	A Terrible Beauty	Neeve Donnelly	
1961	Petticoat Pirates	Chief Officer Anne Stevens	
1962	Stork Talk	Lisa Vernon	
1962	The Brain	Anna Holt	
1963	The Very Edge	Tracey Lawrence	
1965	Ninety Degrees in the Shade	Alena	
1967	The Fox	Ellen March	
1969	The Lady of Monza	Virginia de Leyva	
1969	Midas Run	Sylvia Giroux	
1969	The Chairman	Kay Hanna	
1972	I Want What I Want	Roy/Wendy	
1972	The Killer Is on the Phone	Eleanor Loraine	
1973	The Nun and the Devil	Mother Giulia	
1973	Trader Horn	Nicole Mercer	
1974	The First Time on the Grass	Margherita	
1979	Ring of Darkness	Carlotta Rhodes	
1979	Good Luck, Miss Wyckoff	Evelyn Wyckoff	
1984	What Waits Below	Frieda Shelley	

=== Television ===
Year	Film	Role	Notes
1983	Sadat	Mrs. Raouf	Miniseries; 2 episodes
1988	The Equalizer	Manon Brevard Marcel	Episodes: "The Mystery of Manon" (Parts 1 & 2)
1988	Ohara	Violet Kane	Episode: "Last Year's Model"

== Awards and nominations ==
Award	Year	Category	Work	Result	Ref.
Golden Globe	1968	Best Actress in a Motion Picture – Drama	The Fox	Nominated	
Laurel Award	1968	Female Dramatic Performance	The Fox	5th place	
Maschera D'Argento	1969	Best Actress	The Lady of Monza	Won	
Maschera D'Argento	1973	Best Actress	The Nun and the Devil	Won	
