= Raymond Stross =

British film producer (1916–1988)

- Born: 22 May 1916; Leeds, England
- Died: 31 July 1988 (aged 72); Beverly Hills, California, U.S.
- Occupation: Film producer
- Spouse: Anne Heywood (m. 1960)

Raymond Stross (22 May 1916 – 31 July 1988) was a British film producer. His work was notable in part for its relatively frank sexual content and his long professional association with wife actor Anne Heywood.

== Early life and education ==
Stross was born on 22 May 1916 in Leeds. He was educated at Roynd Hay High School and Abingdon School from 1929 until 1933 and was a member of the second XV rugby team.

== Film ==
Stross left school at age sixteen at went to work at Shepperton Studios. He started Sturt Stross Film Productions in 1937 becoming the second youngest director-producer in the country at the time. His company's first production was a film called The Show's the Thing He also directed the 1937 film The Reverse Be My Lot.

He then went to work for various distributors and became branch manager in Northern Ireland for Columbia pictures. Stross bought a cinema in Belfast and bought up a chain. Then he bought another chain at Norwich. In 1948 Stross travelled to the US to increase his knowledge and prepare for the move into production.

Stross' first film as producer was the 1951 production of Hell is Sold Out, which included Richard Attenborough in his first comedy role. He soon became an "international" producer, frequently using American stars in his movies in order to make them more appealing to the world market.

Ray Stiles, bassist with Mud and The Hollies, called himself Stross in tribute.

Stross had a huge box office success with The Fox (1967).

== Personal life ==
Stross was married to an American with whom he had a daughter, Laraine. He then married actress Clare Corey-James in March 1955 and attend the premiere of As Long as They's Happy that night.

In July 1959 Stross announced he would marry actress Anne Heywood, who he met making A Terrible Beauty. "It was love at first sight," said Heywood. Stross apparently proposed the day after they met. He was still married to Corey-James who was by then a literary agent. He cited David Deutsch as a co-respondent in the divorce case. Stross was granted a divorce on account of adultery between Deutsch and his second wife. Corey-James later announced she would marry Deutsch.

Stross and Heywood married on 12 February 1960 and they had a son and daughter. He died in 1988 at his home in Beverly Hills, California.

== Selected filmography ==
- The Show's the Thing (1936) – director
- The Reverse Be My Lot (1937) – director
- Hell Is Sold Out (1951) – producer
- The Tall Headlines (1952) – producer
- The Man Who Watched Trains Go By (1952) – producer
- Rough Shoot (1953) – producer
- Star of India (1954) – producer
- As Long as They're Happy (1955) – producer
- An Alligator Named Daisy (1955) – producer
- Jumping for Joy (1956) – producer
- A Touch of the Sun (1956) – producer
- The Flesh Is Weak (1957) – producer
- A Question of Adultery (1958) – producer
- The Angry Hills (1959) – producer
- A Terrible Beauty (1960) – producer
- The Mark (1961) – producer
- The Brain (1962) – producer
- The Very Edge (1963) – producer
- The Leather Boys (1964) – producer
- Ninety Degrees in the Shade (1965) – producer
- The Fox (1967) – producer
- Midas Run (1969) – producer
- I Want What I Want (1972) – producer
- Good Luck, Miss Wyckoff (1979) – producer

== See also ==
- List of Old Abingdonians
