= The Fox (1967 film) =

1967 film directed by Mark Rydell

- Theatrical release poster by Bill Gold
- Directed by: Mark Rydell
- Screenplay by: Lewis John Carlino; Howard Koch
- Based on: The Fox (1922 novella) by D. H. Lawrence
- Produced by: Raymond Stross
- Starring: Sandy Dennis; Anne Heywood; Keir Dullea
- Cinematography: William A. Fraker
- Edited by: Thomas Stanford
- Music by: Lalo Schifrin
- Production company: Raymond Stross Productions; Motion Picture International
- Distributed by: Warner Bros.-Seven Arts (through Claridge Pictures)
- Release dates: December 13, 1967 (Canada); February 7, 1968 (U.S.)
- Running time: 110 minutes
- Countries: Canada; United States
- Language: English
- Box office: $19.1 million

The Fox is a 1967 drama film directed by Mark Rydell in his feature directorial debut, adapted by Lewis John Carlino and Howard Koch from the 1923 novella of the same title by D. H. Lawrence. It stars Sandy Dennis and Anne Heywood as two women (implied to be a lesbian couple) living in rural Ontario, and Keir Dullea as the sailor who comes between them. The film was an international co-production between Canada and the United States.

It was released in Canada on December 13, 1967, and in the United States on February 7, 1968. It received positive reviews from critics, and was a commercial success. The film was nominated for four Golden Globe Award nominations, including Best Director – Motion Picture and Best Actress in a Motion Picture – Drama for Anne Heywood, and won Best English-Language Foreign Film. Lalo Schifrin's score was nominated for both an Academy Award and a Grammy Award.

== Plot ==
Jill Banford and Ellen March struggle to support themselves by raising chickens on an isolated farm in rural Ontario. Dependent Jill tends to household chores and finances while the self-sufficient Ellen deals with heavier work, such as chopping wood, repairing fences, and stalking the fox that keeps raiding their coops, although she is hesitant about killing it. Jill seems content with their secluded existence, but the frustrated Ellen is less enchanted by the solitude.

In the dead of winter, merchant seaman Paul Grenfel arrives in search of his grandfather, the former owner of the farm who died one year earlier. With nowhere else to go while on leave, he persuades the women to allow him to stay with them for a few weeks in exchange for helping with the work. Tension among the three slowly escalates when his attention to Ellen arouses Jill's resentment and jealousy. When he proposes marriage to Ellen, Jill is first outraged, then hysterically fearful, even trying to bribe Paul to leave.

Eventually Paul tracks and kills the fox. Just before his departure, he has sex with Ellen and asks her to elope with him, but she confesses she would feel guilty if she abandoned Jill. After Paul returns to his ship, Jill confesses her feelings for Ellen, and the two women have sex. Ellen writes to Paul, explaining that her place is with Jill and that she cannot marry him.

Several weeks later, Paul returns unexpectedly as the two women are chopping down a dying oak. He offers to complete the job and warns Jill to move away from the tree's potential path. In a standoff of wills, Jill refuses to move as Paul continues to chop at the tree. The falling tree crushes Jill, and she dies.

As spring begins, Ellen sells the farm, and she and Paul set off to start a new life together. Knowing that she is silently mourning the loss of Jill, Paul assures Ellen that she will be happy in her new life. She replies, "Will I?"

== Cast ==
The film features only four credited actors:

- Sandy Dennis as Jill Banford
- Anne Heywood as Ellen March
- Keir Dullea as Paul Grenfel
- Glynne Morris as Overstreet

== Production ==
Howard Koch says his wife Anne read the novella while Koch was working on The War Lover and thought it might make a good film. They optioned the rights from D.H. Lawrence's estate and approached Victor Saville to produce. Vivien Leigh and Patricia Neal agreed to play the leads, Alan Bates tentatively agreed to play the male lead and John Schlesinger was approached to direct. However Saville fell seriously ill and Neal became pregnant so the project fell apart.

Koch tried seeking funding for the film in Hollywood but had no luck until he met Anne Heywood who, along with her husband Raymond Stross, was looking for a film to launch her in the United States. Both Heywood and Stross liked the script and optioned it from Koch, although the writer felt Heywood was too young. Stross cast Sandy Dennis and Keir Dullea and hired Mark Rydell to direct. Stross then demanded the inclusion of a scene which showed the two women overtly having a lesbian relationship, which Koch did not want to do, preferring to keep it ambiguous. Stross hired another writer, Lewis John Carlino.

In adapting Lawrence's novella for the screen, Carlino and Koch opted to change the setting from 1918 England to contemporary Canada in an effort to make the plot more relevant for late-1960s audiences. The film was shot on location on a farm in Laskay, Ontario, the train station at Unionville, and at Cinespace Film Studios in Kleinburg.

The film was released soon after the dissolution of the Motion Picture Association of America Production Code and includes scenes of nudity, masturbation, sexual activity involving Paul and Ellen, and physical relations between two women. Rated R at the time of its original release, it was re-edited and rated PG in 1973.

== Reception ==
=== Box office ===
The Fox was the fifth most popular film in general release in Britain in 1968.

=== Critical response ===
Renata Adler of The New York Times called the film "a good and interesting movie" and continued, "The pace and the quality of the color, muted and unnatural, with many scenes photographed in shadows of various kinds, convey a brooding sense of something not quite right with everyone, rather like the tone of Reflections in a Golden Eye."

Roger Ebert of the Chicago Sun-Times called the film "a quiet, powerful masterpiece" and added, "Do not go to see The Fox because of its subject matter, and do not stay away for that reason. The scenes which disturbed Chicago's reactionary censors are filmed with quiet taste and an intuitive knowledge of human nature. And they are only a small part of a wholly natural film. Indeed, it is the natural ease of the film that is so appealing . . . The delicately constructed atmosphere of cold and snow, of early sunsets and chill lingering in the corners, establishes the tone . . . Miss Dennis has a difficult role [that] . . . could have become ridiculous, but [she] manages it well. Dullea is also stronger than he has been in other recent performances. Since David and Lisa, he has been trapped into playing a series of insecure, weak characters; this time, as the dominant personality, he is altogether successful. And he meets his match in Miss Heywood."

TV Guide called it "an uneven adaptation of D.H. Lawrence's novella" and rated it three out of five stars.

=== Awards and nominations ===
Award	Category	Nominee(s)	Result	Ref.
Academy Awards	Best Original Score for a Motion Picture (Not a Musical)	Lalo Schifrin	Nominated	
Golden Globe Awards	Best English-Language Foreign Film	—N/a	Won	
Golden Globe Awards	Best Director – Motion Picture	Mark Rydell	Nominated	
Golden Globe Awards	Best Screenplay – Motion Picture	Lewis John Carlino, Howard Koch	Nominated	
Golden Globe Awards	Best Actress in a Motion Picture – Drama	Anne Heywood	Nominated	
Grammy Awards	Best Original Score Written for a Motion Picture or a Television Special	Lalo Schifrin	Nominated	
Laurel Awards	Top Female Dramatic Performance	Anne Heywood	5th Place	

== Soundtrack ==
The Fox

Soundtrack album by Lalo Schifrin
- Released: 1968
- Recorded: January 1968; Hollywood, California
- Genre: Film score
- Length: 32:08
- Labels: Warner Bros. WS 1738
- Producer: Jimmy Hilliard

Lalo Schifrin chronology
Sol Madrid (1967)	The Fox (1968)	There's a Whole Lalo Schifrin Goin' On (1968)

The film score was composed, arranged and conducted by Lalo Schifrin and the soundtrack album was released on the Warner Bros. label in 1968. The main theme has since acquired notoriety in France as the music for Dim tights commercials. The song "That Night," with music by Lalo Schifrin and lyrics by Norman Gimbel, is performed by Sally Stevens.

=== Track listing ===
All compositions by Lalo Schifrin except as indicated

1. "Theme from the Fox" – 2:26
2. "Frost Trees" – 2:19
3. "Soft Clay" – 1:58
4. "Ellen's Image" – 3:27
5. "Dead Leaf" – 2:50
6. "Foxhole" – 2:11
7. "That Night" (Schifrin, Norman Gimbel) – 2:39
8. "Foxtail" – 2:11
9. "Paul's Memories" – 2:04
10. "Roll It Over" (Schifrin, Gimbel) – 2:17
11. "Trembling" – 2:40
12. "Lonely Road" – 2:04
13. "Dripping Icicles" – 3:02

=== Personnel ===
- Lalo Schifrin – arranger, conductor
- Vincent DeRosa, Richard Perissi – French horn
- Sheridon Stokes, Louise Dissman – flute
- John Neufeld – clarinet
- William Criss – oboe
- William Herzberg – bassoon
- Artie Kane, Caesar Giovannini – piano
- Tommy Tedesco – guitar
- Ken Watson, Joe Porcaro, Emil Richards – percussion
- Erno Neufeld, Marvin Limonick – violin
- Myra Kestenbaum – viola
- Raphael Kramer – cello
- Dorothy Remsen – harp
- Sally Stevens (track 7), Anne Heywood (track 10) – vocals
- Lloyd Basham – orchestra manager

== Obscenity claims ==
The film was the subject of McGrew v. City of Jackson, Mississippi, a federal case on the constitutionality of the state of Mississippi’s obscenity statute. The statute prohibited any “exhibit to public view on a screen or otherwise, any obscene, indecent, or immoral picture,” and authorizes an officer to make an arrest at any time without a warrant for a misdemeanor committed in his presence. In 1968, two police officers and the city prosecuting attorney as paid guests visited a local theater in Jackson during a showing of The Fox. At the conclusion of the showing, the police officers arrested the theater owner, Irene McGrew, and seized the entire film.

McGrew appealed the conviction, claiming that the Mississippi statute violated the first and fourteenth amendments of the United States Constitution which guarantees freedom of expression. In a 2-1 vote, the judges of the United States District Court for the Southern District of Mississippi upheld the conviction, saying the statute was constitutional. The majority said, "The dominant theme of The Fox film is sex in a raw state in a product which the producers have attempted to whitewash and clean up just sufficiently to possibly escape condemnation as utter filth." The dissenting judge said, "I think that the applicable Mississippi obscenity statute fails to meet the constitutional requirements of the first and fourteenth amendments guaranteeing freedom of expression."
