= I Want What I Want (film) =

1972 British film by John Dexter

- Theatrical release poster
- Directed by: John Dexter
- Written by: Geoff Brown (novel); Gillian Freeman
- Produced by: Raymond Stross
- Starring: Anne Heywood; Harry Andrews; Jill Bennett
- Cinematography: Gerry Turpin
- Edited by: Peter Thornton
- Music by: Johnny Harris
- Release date: 1972
- Running time: 91 minutes
- Country: United Kingdom

I Want What I Want is a 1972 British drama film directed by John Dexter and starring Anne Heywood, Harry Andrews and Jill Bennett. It was written by Gillian Freeman based on the 1966 novel I Want What I Want by Geoff Brown.

The film was one of several collaborations between producer Raymond Stross and his wife actress Anne Heywood.

== Plot ==
Roy is a quiet boy, confused about his gender and with an interest in women's clothes. After a row with his domineering father, who discovers Roy wearing one of his late mother's dresses, Roy leaves home to begin a life as a woman, calling himself Wendy. He subsequently undergoes a sex-change operation.

== Cast ==
- Anne Heywood as Roy / Wendy
- Harry Andrews as Roy's father
- Jill Bennett as Margaret Stevenson
- Paul Rogers as Mr. Waites
- Michael Coles as Frank
- Sheila Reid as June
- Virginia Stride as Shirley
- Jill Melford as Lorna
- Philip Bond as Philip
- Rachel Gurney as Mrs. Parkhurst
- Robin Hawdon as Tony
- Anthony Sharp as Mr. Parkhurst

== Critical reception ==
The Monthly Film Bulletin wrote: "Tasteless and exploitative for all its earnest production notes ("The transexual, latent or developed, may be more prevalent in modern society than is generally realised"), I Want What I Want is likely to cause as much distaste as that other controversial film about an 'abnormal' minority, Roy Boulting's Twisted Nerve. This time the problem area is transexuals rather than mongols, but the treatment is no less crudely misleading. As Gillian Freeman's script piles enormity on enormity, from parental renunciation to traumatic frigidity to attempted rape to self-castration, the film's few attempts at 'seriousness' (typified by Paul Rogers' kindly doctor, who assures Wendy that she can have an operation although she will never actually look like a woman) seem perfunctory sops to its conscience. Anne Heywood struggles manfully (?) with her dual role as Roy and Wendy, and John Dexter's direction has some Sirk-like moments of high-gloss emotionalism that would be quite fetching in any other context. But the conclusions to which the audience is led by the film's relentless melodramatics are likely to increase rather than diminish its fear of a misunderstood minority."

Variety wrote: "The character of the protagonist is rather shallowly studied with much reliance visually, on facial expressions to convey mental anguish or verbally. Despite an intense performance by Miss Heywood, the pic does not effectively create the suspension of disbelief that is necessary to view her as a man. From the first scene in which she appears, she looks like a woman dressed as a man. Despite attempts to act masculine (pushing her voice into a lower register, trying to effect a graceless gait) they all seem too obviously forced. And when dressed as a woman, even with sloppily applied make-up, she looks more like a woman who is poorly made-up than a man in drag. ... The film's slow pacing although appropriate for the reflective tone of the material, becomes somewhat lethargic. This combined with the drab dressing (despite brightly colored costumes) and a ponderous syrupy score, give the film an uncomfortably oppressive air."

Leslie Halliwell wrote "Although based on an actual trans-sexual experience, this film confuses more than that it informs, and provokes unintentional mirth when its glamourous star is playing a boy."

In The Radio Times Guide to Films Adrian Turner gave the film 1/5 stars, writing: "Heywood starts out as a Roy and ends up as a Wendy but nothing – not even some hideous make up, silly clothes and a deep voice – can disguise the fact that she's a woman from start to finish. Not a very helpful contribution to a little-understood subject."
