= Base FX =

Visual effects and animation company

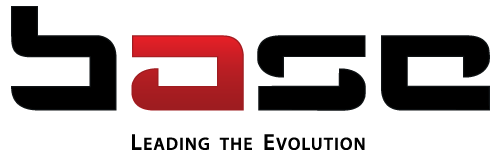
- Industry: Visual effects, Computer-generated imagery, Feature animation
- Founded: November 2006; 19 years ago
- Headquarters: Beijing, China; Kuala Lumpur, Malaysia; Wuxi, China; Xiamen, China and Los Angeles, United States
- Key people: Christopher Bremble (Founder & CEO); Neil Xie (Vice President); Tang Bingbing (Chief Creative Officer)
- Number of employees: 500
- Website: Base-FX.com

Base FX is a visual effects and animation company with production studios in Beijing, Kuala Lumpur, Wuxi and Xiamen, and an office in Los Angeles. The company was founded in 2006 and has completed more than 150 films.

Base FX specializes in high-end creature and character animation, fluid and dynamic effects, and photo-real 3D matte painting and set extensions, providing services to Hollywood film companies, producers and top directors in China.

== History ==
Base FX was founded in 2006 by Chris Bremble and a team of 12 artists and CG instructors who had previously worked on one of Bremble's films, the 2005 picture Deep Rescue. The company quickly began to grow, securing clients in China and Hollywood, and building a talented team of artists.

In 2010, Christopher Bremble was awarded an Emmy for Outstanding Special Visual Effects in a Movie or Mini-Series for the company's work on HBO's epic war saga The Pacific. The company was awarded its second Emmy in 2011 for its work on HBO's Boardwalk Empire, an American period crime drama television series, and a third one in 2014 for its work on Starz's pirate adventure series "Black Sails".

In May, 2012, Base signed a Strategic Alliance Agreement with Lucasfilm and Industrial Light & Magic (ILM). At the Beijing Film Festival on April 18, 2013, the two companies signed an expanded co-operation deal that secures the exclusive use of the Beijing-based studio’s services for all ILM’s Hollywood films.

In 2012, Base stationed in the industrial park in Wuxi, China, and will work on animation films for clients.

In 2014, Base opened its third production studio in Xiamen, China, to make visual effects for Hollywood films.

On December 29, 2014, Base FX signed strategic cooperation agreements with China Fortune Land Development Co., Ltd. (CFLD) and will tenant in Dachang Film and Media Industrial Park to build a high-end VFX training base. As of 2014, Base FX has finished 120 projects with more than 10,000 visual effects shots.

On 20 April 2015, Base FX jointly founded China Post Production Alliance (CPPA) at the 5th Beijing International Film Festival to promote and enhance the development of visual effects in China.

In August 2018, Base FX's production arm Base Pictures, working with Meridian Entertainment, began production on the action disaster film Skyfire. Directed by Simon West, the film stars Hannah Quinlivan, Wang Xueqi, and Shawn Dou and is scheduled to be released on December 12, 2019. It is produced by Chris Bremble, Jennifer Dong, and Jib Polhemus.

Base FX's very first overseas production facility was set to open in mid-June of 2018 in Bangsar South complex in Kuala Lumpur, Malaysia. The full-service studio will be staffed by over 200 staff.

In 2022, the company accused two men, Kevin Robl and Remington Chase, of defrauding the company and its investors out of $234 million over the course of several years.

In 2025, Base FX teamed up with Moonton and The Little Black Book Studios to develop a new Mobile Legends: Bang Bang animated series.

== Credits ==
Year	Name of film
2026	Avengers: Doomsday; Street Fighter
2025	Creation of the Gods II: Demon Force; Thunderbolts*; Detective Chinatown 1900; Ne Zha 2; Daredevil: Born Again; Legends of the Condor Heroes: The Gallants
2024	749 Bureau; Deadpool & Wolverine; Ordinary Angels
2023	Creation of the Gods I: Kingdom of Storms; Ant-Man and the Wasp: Quantumania; Plane
2022	Thor: Love and Thunder; Spirited; Black Panther: Wakanda Forever
2021	Seal Team (film); The Battle at Lake Changjin; My Little Pony: A New Generation; Wish Dragon
2019	Skyfire
2018	Aquaman; The Cloverfield Paradox
2017	Valerian and the City of a Thousand Planets; Thor: Ragnarok
2016	The Great Wall; Star Trek Beyond; The Night Of; Captain America: Civil War; Warcraft; Teenage Mutant Ninja Turtles: Out of the Shadows
2015	Star Wars: The Force Awakens; Monster Hunt; Tomorrowland; Jurassic World; Terminator Genisys; Into the Grizzly Maze; Agent Carter; Wolf Totem
2014	Captain America: The Winter Soldier; Earth to Echo; Transformers: Age of Extinction; Teenage Mutant Ninja Turtles; Breakup Buddies; Black Sails; The Last Ship
2013	Boardwalk Empire (TV Series) Season 3; Identity Thief; Man of Tai Chi; Olympus Has Fallen; Pain & Gain; Star Trek Into Darkness; Pacific Rim; The Lone Ranger
2012	Cloud Atlas; The Last Supper; G.I. Joe: Retaliation; Looper; The Last Stand; The Four
2011	Super 8; Mission: Impossible – Ghost Protocol; Boardwalk Empire (TV Series) Season 2; Conan the Barbarian; Wrath of the Titans; Beethoven's Christmas Adventure; Green China Rising; Blue Crush 2; Bait 3D; Transformers: Dark of the Moon; Game of Thrones; Battleship; Men in Black 3; Marley & Me: The Puppy Years; The Flowers of War; New Year's Eve; Pirates of the Caribbean: On Stranger Tides; Cowboys & Aliens; Abraham Lincoln: Vampire Hunter
2010	Boardwalk Empire (TV Series) Season 1; I Am Number Four; Beverly Hills Chihuahua 2; Soul Surfer; Roadkill; Red: Werewolf Hunter; The Flying Machine
2009	Altitude; American Pie Presents: The Book of Love; Hot Summer Days; Mothman; Mrs. Washington Goes to Smith; The Pacific; Paradox; Qiuxi; Safe Harbor; Smokin' Aces 2: Assassins' Ball; Witchville
2008	All About Women; Beethoven's Big Break; Beyond Sherwood Forest; Cadillac Records; Fireball; Joy Ride 2: Dead Ahead; Grey Gardens; The King of Fighters; The Most Wonderful Time of the Year
2007	Chasing 3000; Empire of Silver; Flight Log; The Haunting of Sorority Row; Lake Dead; The One; Recount; Sad Fairytale
2006	Christmas Everyday; The Perfect Holiday; Razortooth
2005	Deep Rescue
