= Con Air =

1997 American action thriller film by Simon West

- Theatrical release poster
- Directed by: Simon West
- Written by: Scott Rosenberg
- Produced by: Jerry Bruckheimer
- Starring: Nicolas Cage; John Cusack; John Malkovich; Steve Buscemi; Ving Rhames; Colm Meaney; Mykelti Williamson; Rachel Ticotin
- Cinematography: David Tattersall
- Edited by: Chris Lebenzon; Steve Mirkovich; Glen Scantlebury
- Music by: Mark Mancina; Trevor Rabin
- Production companies: Touchstone Pictures; Jerry Bruckheimer Films
- Distributed by: Buena Vista Pictures Distribution
- Release date: June 6, 1997
- Running time: 115 minutes
- Country: United States
- Language: English
- Budget: $75 million
- Box office: $224 million

Con Air is a 1997 American action thriller film directed by Simon West (in his feature directorial debut) and starring Nicolas Cage, John Cusack and John Malkovich in the lead roles. Written by Scott Rosenberg and produced by Jerry Bruckheimer, the film centers on a prison break aboard a Justice Prisoner and Alien Transportation System (JPATS) aircraft, nicknamed "Con Air". It features an ensemble supporting cast of Steve Buscemi, Ving Rhames, Colm Meaney, Mykelti Williamson and Rachel Ticotin, with Monica Potter, Dave Chappelle, M. C. Gainey, and Danny Trejo in minor roles.

Con Air was released theatrically on June 6, 1997, by Buena Vista Pictures through Touchstone Pictures and was a box office success, grossing over $224 million against a production budget of $75 million. The film received mixed reviews from critics, who praised the acting, musical score and action sequences, but criticized the inconsistent tone, direction and character development. The film achieved a cult following among action aficionados and the Nicolas Cage fanbase. It received Oscar nominations for Best Sound and Best Original Song for "How Do I Live", performed on the soundtrack by Trisha Yearwood.

== Plot ==
Decorated honorably discharged Army Ranger Cameron Poe is convicted of involuntary manslaughter for killing a bar patron in self-defense when the other man drunkenly attacks him and his pregnant wife, Tricia. During his eight-year sentence, he writes letters to Tricia and their daughter Casey, whom he has never met. Eight years later, he is paroled and boards a flight to Alabama on the Jailbird, a Fairchild C-123 Provider converted to a prison transport plane, so he can be reunited with his family on Casey's birthday. Accompanying Poe is his diabetic cellmate and best friend Mike "Baby-O" O'Dell.

Most of the inmates boarding the flight are convicts being transferred to a newly opened supermax prison, including mass felon William "Billy Bedlam" Bedford, serial rapist John "Johnny 23" Baca, Black Guerrilla Nathan "Diamond Dog" Jones, and professional criminal Cyrus "The Virus" Grissom. The flight is overseen by U.S. Marshal Vince Larkin while DEA special agent Willie Sims plans to go on an undercover mission to get information from narcoterrorist Francisco Cindino, who is being picked up en route; unbeknownst to Larkin, Sims' partner, Duncan Malloy, smuggles a gun on board for Sims.

After taking off, inmate Joe "Pinball" Parker sets another prisoner on fire as a distraction, allowing Grissom and Jones to take over the plane. They plan to land at Carson Airport as scheduled, pick up and transfer other prisoners, and fly to a non-extradition country after switching planes and meeting the financiers of his escape. Sims tries to retake control, but Grissom kills him in the process.

The plane arrives at Carson City and the exchange of inmates commences, with the ground crew unaware of the hijacking. Amongst the new passengers are Cindino, pilot Earl "Swamp Thing" Williams and serial killer Garland Greene. The authorities discover the hijacking upon finding evidence in Grissom's old cell and a tape recorder planted by Poe on one of the disguised guards but cannot prevent the plane from taking off. Meanwhile, Pinball disposes of the plane's transponder, but he is crushed to death by the landing gear during takeoff.

The inmates plan to land at Lerner Airfield, a desert airstrip, and transfer onto another plane owned by Cindino and his cartel. Poe finds Pinball's corpse trapped in the landing gear and writes a message to Larkin on the body before throwing it out. Larkin learns of the news and heads to Lerner after contacting the National Guard. Bedford, raiding the cargo, discovers Poe's identity, forcing Poe to kill him.

The Jailbird is grounded at Lerner, a derelict strip next to an aircraft boneyard, with no sign of the transfer aircraft. Grissom orders the others to fuel up the plane and prepare for takeoff. Poe leaves to find Baby-O a syringe to give him insulin. Poe meets Larkin and informs him of the situation. They discover Cindino attempting to escape on a hidden private jet, which Larkin sabotages by lowering a crane arm onto it. Betrayed, Grissom executes Cindino by igniting the plane's fuel. Greene meets a little girl playing tea party near the hangar and is tempted to kill her, but he resists his homicidal urges. Johnny 23 spots a National Guard convoy approaching and gives the alarm. As the National Guard arrives, the inmates launch an enormous assault in the boneyard, resulting in various casualties, but Larkin uses a bulldozer as a makeshift shield, rallying the remaining guardsmen and forcing the convicts to retreat. The surviving inmates return to the Jailbird and get airborne. Poe rescues guard Sally Bishop as well.

Poe's identity is revealed when Bedford's body is found. Baby-O takes the blame and is shot by Grissom, when Larkin and Malloy arrive in attack helicopters, damaging the Jailbird's fuel tank. Poe takes command of the cockpit, and Larkin instructs him to have the plane land at McCarran International Airport, but due to damage, Swamp Thing is forced to land it on the Las Vegas Strip, causing mass destruction and killing Johnny 23. Grissom, Jones, and Swamp Thing escape on a fire truck, pursued by Poe and Larkin on police motorcycles; the chase results in the deaths of all three escapees. Poe reunites with his family, Baby-O is hospitalized and the surviving inmates are apprehended, except for Greene, who is last seen gambling in a casino.

== Cast ==
- Nicolas Cage as Cameron Poe, a paroled former Army Ranger who works with the authorities to retake the titular flight.
- John Cusack as U.S. Marshal Vince Larkin, who discovers Poe's role in retaking the plane.
- John Malkovich as Cyrus "The Virus" Grissom, a highly intelligent career criminal and mastermind of the escape plot.
- Ving Rhames as Nathan "Diamond Dog" Jones, a black nationalist convicted of terrorism and Grissom's second-in-command.
- Mykelti Williamson as Mike "Baby-O" O'Dell, Poe's diabetic friend and cellmate.
- Rachel Ticotin as Officer Sally Bishop, the flight's only female corrections officer who is protected by Poe after being attacked by Johnny 23.
- Monica Potter as Tricia Poe, Cameron Poe's wife.
- Landry Allbright as Casey Poe, Cameron Poe's seven-year-old daughter.
- Colm Meaney as DEA Agent Duncan Malloy
- Steve Buscemi as Garland "The Marietta Mangler" Greene, a notorious serial killer. Director Simon West and Buscemi based the character on real-life serial killers Ed Gein, Ted Bundy, Charles Manson, Jeffrey Dahmer, John Wayne Gacy and Edmund Kemper.
- Nick Chinlund as William "Billy Bedlam" Bedford, a mass murderer convicted for killing his unfaithful ex-wife's family.
- Danny Trejo as John "Johnny 23" Baca, a serial rapist, nicknamed for his number of sex offense convictions.
- Dave Chappelle as Joe "Pinball" Parker, a low-level inmate convicted of heroin, armed robbery, and arson charges.
- M. C. Gainey as Earl "Swamp Thing" Williams, a convict with aviation expertise who serves as Cyrus' pilot.
- Jesse Borrego as Francisco Cindino, a treacherous South American drug baron and terrorist who helps Grissom (offscreen) plot the hijacking. Borrego studied Colombian narcoterrorist kingpin Pablo Escobar for the portrayal of this character.
- Renoly Santiago (credited as "Renoly") as Ramon "Sally-Can't Dance" Martinez, a cross-dressing inmate convicted of narcotics charges.
- Brendan Kelly as Conrad
- Angela Featherstone as Ginny.
- John Roselius as Deputy Marshal Skip Devers.
- Jose Zuniga as DEA Agent Willie Sims
- Steve Eastin as Officer Falzon, the leader of corrections officers on board the flight.
- Kevin Gage as Billy Joe, a drunken bar patron whom Poe kills in self-defense.
- Dabbs Greer as Old Man under Truck, Lerner Airfield

Additional actors include Ty Granderson Jones as "Blade", Emilio Rivera as Carlos, Doug Hutchison as Donald, Jeris Lee Poindexter as Watts, David Ramsey as Londell, Conrad Goode as Lars "Viking" Olsson, John Diehl as Poe's defense attorney, and Don S. Davis as the motorist whose car Pinball's corpse falls on. Powers Boothe makes an uncredited voice-over cameo in the opening credits as the Army officer at Poe's leaving ceremony. John Cusack's brother Bill Cusack appears as a Las Vegas EMT.

Malkovich was considered early for the role of Grissom. Michael Biehn, Jason Isaacs, Mickey Rourke, Willem Dafoe and Tom Sizemore auditioned for the role. Bruce Willis turned down the role.

== Production ==
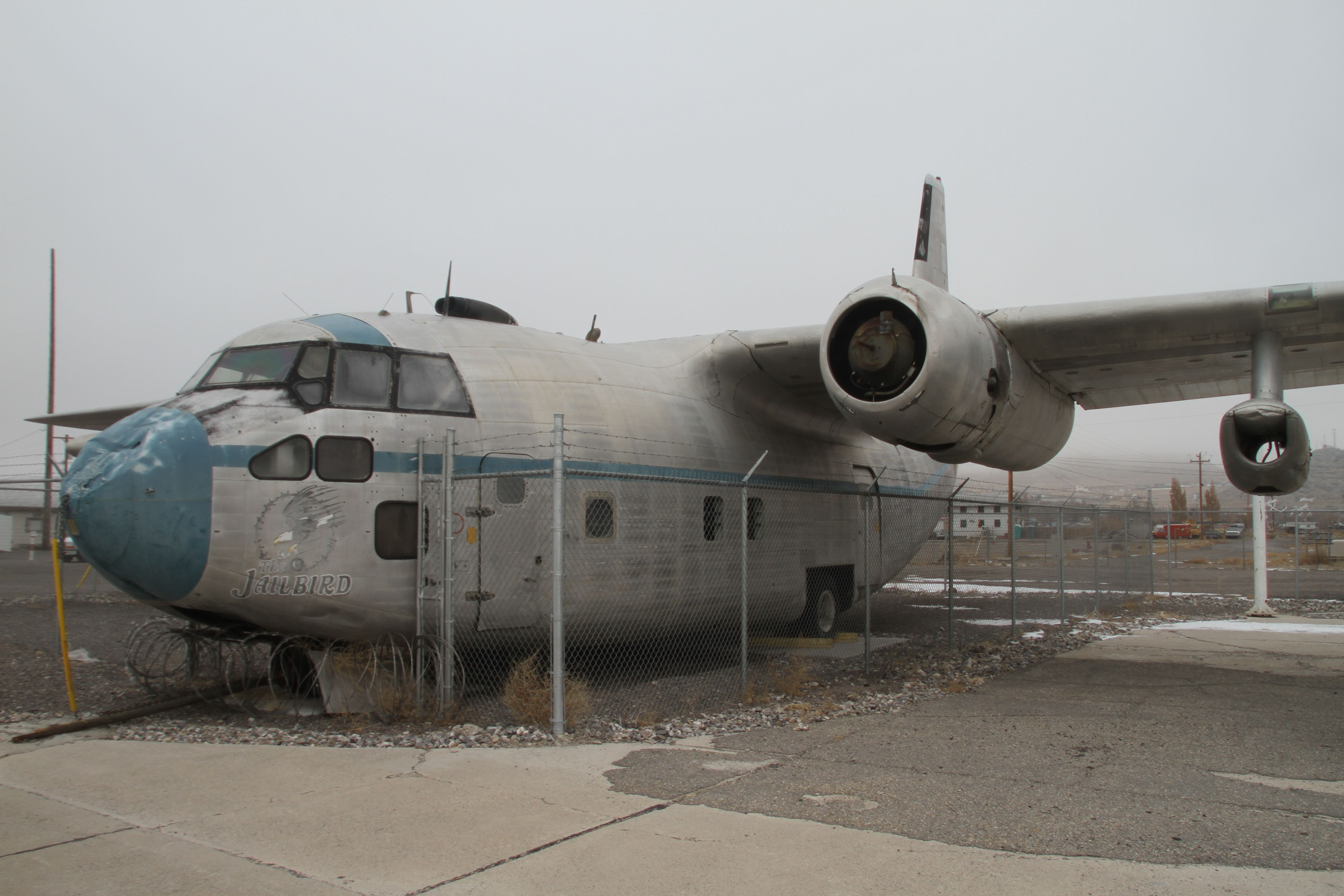
C-123 used for taxi scenes at Wendover Airport, c. 2011.

With second unit work beginning on June 24, 1996, principal photography began shortly after in Salt Lake City, on July 1, 1996, and continued until roughly October 29, 1996, at a number of locations. While most of the interiors of the Fairchild C-123 Provider transport aircraft were filmed in Hollywood Center Studios soundstage #7, Wendover Airport in Utah, as the stand in for the fictional Lerner Airfield, was used for the C-123 flying and taxi scenes. Director Simon West chose the barren and remote Wendover area "because it looked like the surface of the moon ... My idea was that it was perfect for the convicts who had been locked up for 10, 20, 30 years in little cells." The old wartime bomber base was also used for the aircraft boneyard scenes while the original swimming pool at the base was used in a scene where Garland Greene was talking to a young girl.

The jail scenes in the beginning of the film were shot at the Lincoln Heights Jail in Los Angeles.

On August 29, 1996, Phillip Swartz, a welder employed by Special Effects Unlimited, a Los Angeles–based firm, was crushed to death at Wendover when a static model of the C-123 used in the film fell on him. The film credits end with "In Memory of Phil Swartz".

Other filming locations included Ogden Airport where the exchange of prisoners is seen. The scene where the aircraft's left wing hits the Fender Stratocaster sign of Hard Rock Hotel and Casino (which later played host to the film's premiere), was filmed using a replicated guitar sign and a Jailbird miniature model. The crash site was filmed in the Sands Hotel before its demolition on November 26, 1996. Producer Jerry Bruckheimer found the right spot for the climactic finale, originally planned for a crash at the White House, but Las Vegas was more in keeping with the theme and visual pun of convicts "cashing in". "We got very lucky ... The Sands was going to be demolished anyway. They blew up the tower on their own. We arranged to blow up the front of the building." The 2nd Street Tunnel in Los Angeles was also used for the tunnel chase scene near the end of the film.

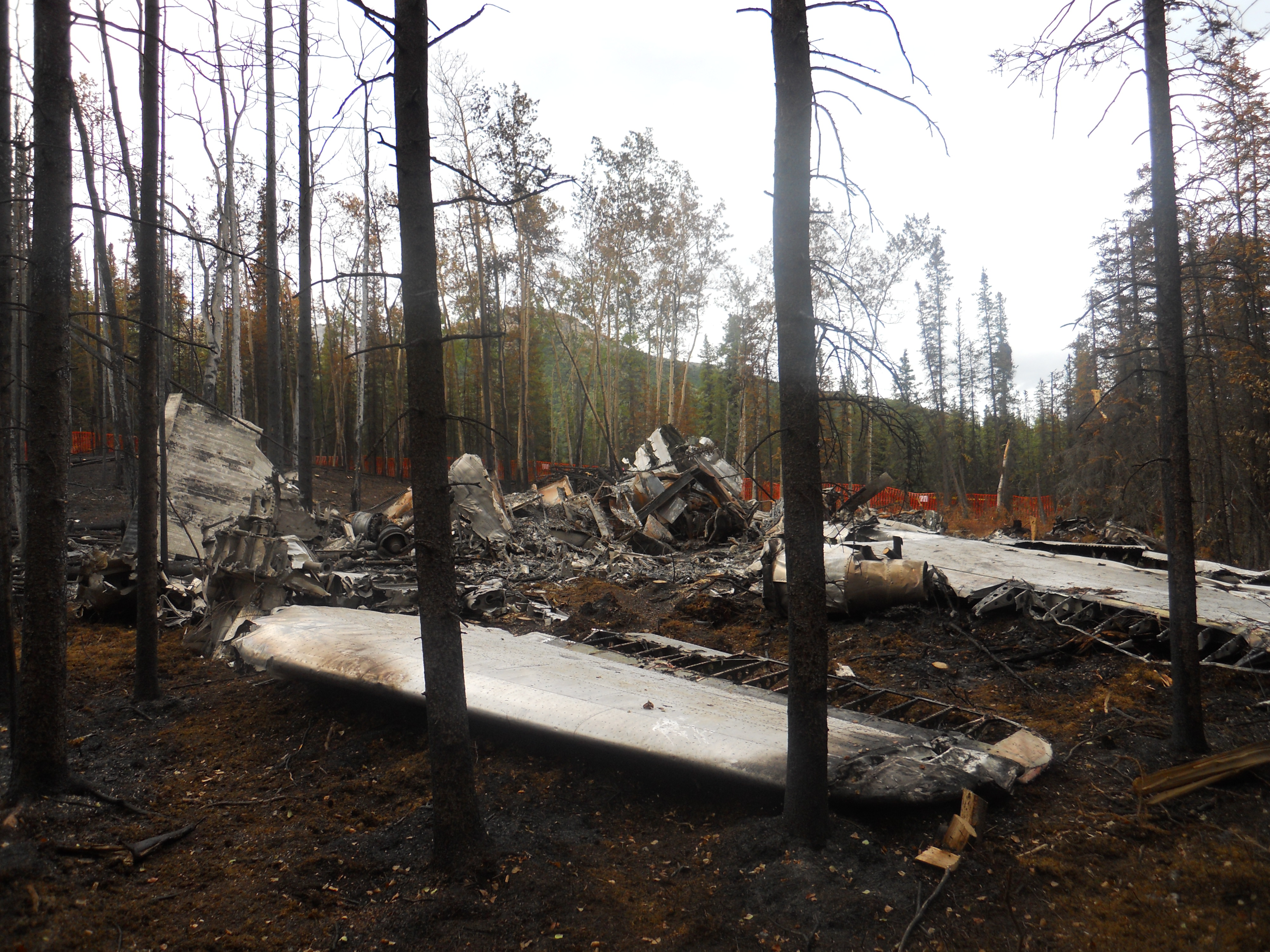
Crash site of the C-123 from Con Air, Mount Healy, Denali National Park, Alaska

Three C-123's were used during production and were painted with the Jailbird livery. The actual flying C-123 model used during flight scenes in the film had a series of both military and private owners. In December 2003 it was sold to All West Freight Inc. in Delta Junction, Alaska. On August 1, 2010, the C-123 was destroyed when it crashed into Mount Healy within Denali National Park in Alaska. The three member flight crew was killed in the crash. Another C-123, formerly registered as N94DT, was used for the crash scene in Las Vegas and then scrapped following production. The third Jailbird movie model used for the taxi scenes was later donated by the filmmakers to the Historic Wendover Airfield Foundation, where it remains on display at the ramp as an attraction for visitors.

The film used several highly detailed models at 1/15th scale, and a multitude of military and private aircraft assembled for the desert boneyard scene. (Note: A Convair C-131 Samaritan transport aircraft and Piasecki H-21 helicopter were prominent among the scattered wreckage of the boneyard scene.)

== Music ==
Con Air: Music from the Motion Picture

Soundtrack album by Trevor Rabin, Mark Mancina
- Released: June 17, 1997
- Genre: Soundtrack
- Length: 44:19
- Label: Hollywood Records
- Producers: Paul Linford, Mark Mancina, Trevor Rabin

Professional ratings
Review scores
Source	Rating
AllMusic	2/5 stars

The film featured the Diane Warren–penned LeAnn Rimes hit single "How Do I Live", performed by Trisha Yearwood for the film. (Note: Walt Disney Motion Picture Group (which owns Touchstone Pictures) chose Rimes' version but thought the version had too much of pop feeling, with Trisha Yearwood's version used instead. Both versions were released on May 27, 1997.)

The Con Air soundtrack album omits two songs featured in the film: "How Do I Live", written by Diane Warren and performed by Trisha Yearwood and "Sweet Home Alabama" by Lynyrd Skynyrd. Although a key element of the film, Mick LaSalle of the San Francisco Chronicle noted, "The soundtrack kicks into loud, obtrusive gear ... [and] remains so loud throughout the picture that it practically functions as a distancing device."

1. "Con Air Theme" – 1:34
2. "Trisha" – 1:04
3. "Carson City" – 3:05
4. "Lear Crash" – 4:44
5. "Lerner Landing" – 3:28
6. "Romantic Chaos" – 1:23
7. "The Takeover" – 3:52
8. "The Discharge" – 1:09
9. "Jailbirds" – 0:59
10. "Cons Check Out Lerner" – 1:56
11. "Poe Saves Cops" – 2:25
12. "The Fight" – 0:23
13. "Battle In The Boneyard" – 7:41
14. "Poe Meets Larkin" – 1:16
15. "Bedlam Larkin" – :49
16. "Fire Truck Chase" – 4:22
17. "Overture" – 4:19

== Reception ==
=== Box office ===
Con Air opened June 6, 1997, on 2,824 screens in the United States and Canada and grossed $24.1 million in its opening weekend, topping the US box office above The Lost World: Jurassic Park. For its second weekend, the film dropped into second place behind Speed 2: Cruise Control, but still made $15.7 million. It also opened in the UK, Hong Kong, Israel and parts of Latin America, including Brazil and Mexico grossing $5 million for the weekend, for a total worldwide opening of $29 million. In the US and Canada, it grossed $15.7 million in its second weekend and $10.4 million in its third, finishing second and third, respectively.

The film grossed $101 million in the United States and Canada, and $123 million in other territories, for a worldwide total of $224 million.

=== Critical response ===
According to review aggregator Rotten Tomatoes, 59% of 70 critics gave the film a positive review, with an average rating of 5.7/10. The website's critics consensus reads, "Con Air won't win any awards for believability – and all involved seem cheerfully aware of it, making some of this blockbuster action outing's biggest flaws fairly easy to forgive." On Metacritic, the film has a weighted average score of 52 out of 100, based on 23 critics, indicating "mixed or average" reviews. Audiences polled by CinemaScore gave the film an average grade of "B+" on an A+ to F scale.

Roger Ebert, reviewing the film for the Chicago Sun-Times, awarded it three out of four stars, saying it "moves smoothly and with visual style and verbal wit," although he criticized Cage for playing Poe as a "slow-witted Elvis type who is very, very earnest and approaches every task with tunnel vision". Janet Maslin, reviewer for The New York Times considered Con Air an exemplar of the "thrill ride genre". In contrast, Rolling Stone reviewer Peter Travers decried the "flip, hip" and ultimately, "depressing ... pandering" present in the treatment.

Andrew Johnston, reviewer for Time Out New York, stated: "Leaving The Rock last summer, I thought it seemed physically impossible for a more over-the-top action movie to be made. That was pretty short-sighted of me, since it was only a matter of time until producer Jerry Bruckheimer topped himself as he does with the wildly entertaining Con Air."

Maxim put the film's climactic Las Vegas plane crash at the top of their 2007 list of "The Top Ten Most Horrific Movie Plane Crashes", a decision that was derided by Wired.

=== Accolades ===
Award	Category	Nominee(s)	Result
Academy Awards	Best Original Song	"How Do I Live"; Music and Lyrics by Diane Warren	Nominated
Academy Awards	Best Sound	Kevin O'Connell, Greg P. Russell and Art Rochester	Nominated
ALMA Awards	Outstanding Actress in a Feature Film	Rachel Ticotin	Nominated
ASCAP Film and Television Music Awards	Most Performed Songs from Motion Pictures	"How Do I Live"; Music and Lyrics by Diane Warren	Won
Blockbuster Entertainment Awards	Favorite Actor – Action/Adventure	Nicolas Cage (also for Face/Off)	Won
Blockbuster Entertainment Awards	Favorite Supporting Actor – Action/Adventure	John Cusack	Won
Blockbuster Entertainment Awards	Favorite Supporting Actress – Action/Adventure	Rachel Ticotin	Nominated
Blockbuster Entertainment Awards	Favorite Song from a Movie	Trisha Yearwood – "How Do I Live"	Nominated
BMI Film & TV Awards	Film Music Award	Mark Mancina	Won
Bogey Awards			Won
Golden Raspberry Awards	Worst Original Song	"How Do I Live"; Music and Lyrics by Diane Warren	Nominated
Golden Raspberry Awards	Worst Reckless Disregard for Human Life and Public Property		Won
Golden Reel Awards	Best Sound Editing – Dialogue & ADR	David Williams, Robert Ulrich, Gail Clark Burch, Jeff Clark, Richard Corwin, Susan Kurtz, Carin Rogers, Zack Davis, Stephen Janisz and Kerry Dean Williams	Nominated
Golden Reel Awards	Best Sound Editing – Sound Effects & Foley		Nominated
Grammy Awards	Best Song Written Specifically for a Motion Picture or for Television	"How Do I Live"; Music and Lyrics by Diane Warren	Nominated
Jupiter Awards	Best International Actor	Nicolas Cage (also for Face/Off)	Won
Online Film & Television Association Awards	Best Original Song	"How Do I Live"; Music and Lyrics by Diane Warren	Nominated
Saturn Awards	Best Supporting Actor	Steve Buscemi	Nominated

== See also ==
- List of American films of 1997
- List of films set in Las Vegas
