= The Legend Hunters =

2025 action film directed by Simon West

- Official poster
- Chinese: 寻龙诀·觅踪
- Directed by: Simon West; Li Yifan
- Written by: Li Yifan
- Based on: Ghost Blows Out the Light by Zhang Muye
- Produced by: Zhang Wang
- Starring: Zhang Hanyu; Jiang Wu; Celina Jade; Lorenzo de Moor
- Cinematography: Liu Yin
- Edited by: Andrew MacRitchie
- Music by: Pedro Osuna; Björn Shen
- Production companies: Wanda Pictures; Saints Entertainment
- Release dates: May 8, 2025 (Brazil); April 17, 2026 (China)
- Running time: 101 minutes
- Country: China
- Language: Mandarin

The Legend Hunters (Chinese: 寻龙诀·觅踪) is a 2025 Chinese action film directed by Simon West and Li Yifan and written by Li Yifan. It is based on the novel series Ghost Blows Out the Light by Zhang Muye. The film stars Zhang Hanyu, Jiang Wu, Celina Jade and Lorenzo de Moor.

The film was theatrically released in Brazil on May 8, 2025. The film was released on streaming services in mainland China on April 17, 2026.

== Premise ==
The film follows a team of adventurers as they try to raid a tomb made by master tomb raiders.

== Cast ==
- Zhang Hanyu as Hu Bayi
- Jiang Wu as Wang Kaixuan
- Celina Jade as Shirley Yang
- Lorenzo de Moor as Sergio Russo

== Production ==
=== Development ===
In May 2019, Simon West signed on to direct two Chinese films, Skyfire and The Legend Hunters. The Legend Hunters is based on the popular novel series Ghost Blows Out the Light.

=== Filming ===
Principal photography began in June 2019 at the Qingdao Oriental Movie Metropolis, with Zhang Hanyu, Jiang Wu and Celina Jade in starring roles. Filming wrapped in August 2019, in Russia.

=== Post-production ===
In December 2019, post-production was halted when West was ordered by the China Tribunal to return $200,000 to Hongmaisui HMS Entertainment, resulting in West being unable to work on the Chinese-produced film, until the fee was paid.

== Release ==
Initially scheduled for a July 2020 release, The Legend Hunters was rescheduled to be released in Mainland China by Wanda Pictures and Saints Entertainment in 2021, though this did not occur. The film was ultimately theatrically released in Brazil on May 8, 2025.

The film was released on streaming services in mainland China on April 17, 2026.
