= Mount Healy =

Mountain Summit Located in the Alaska Range

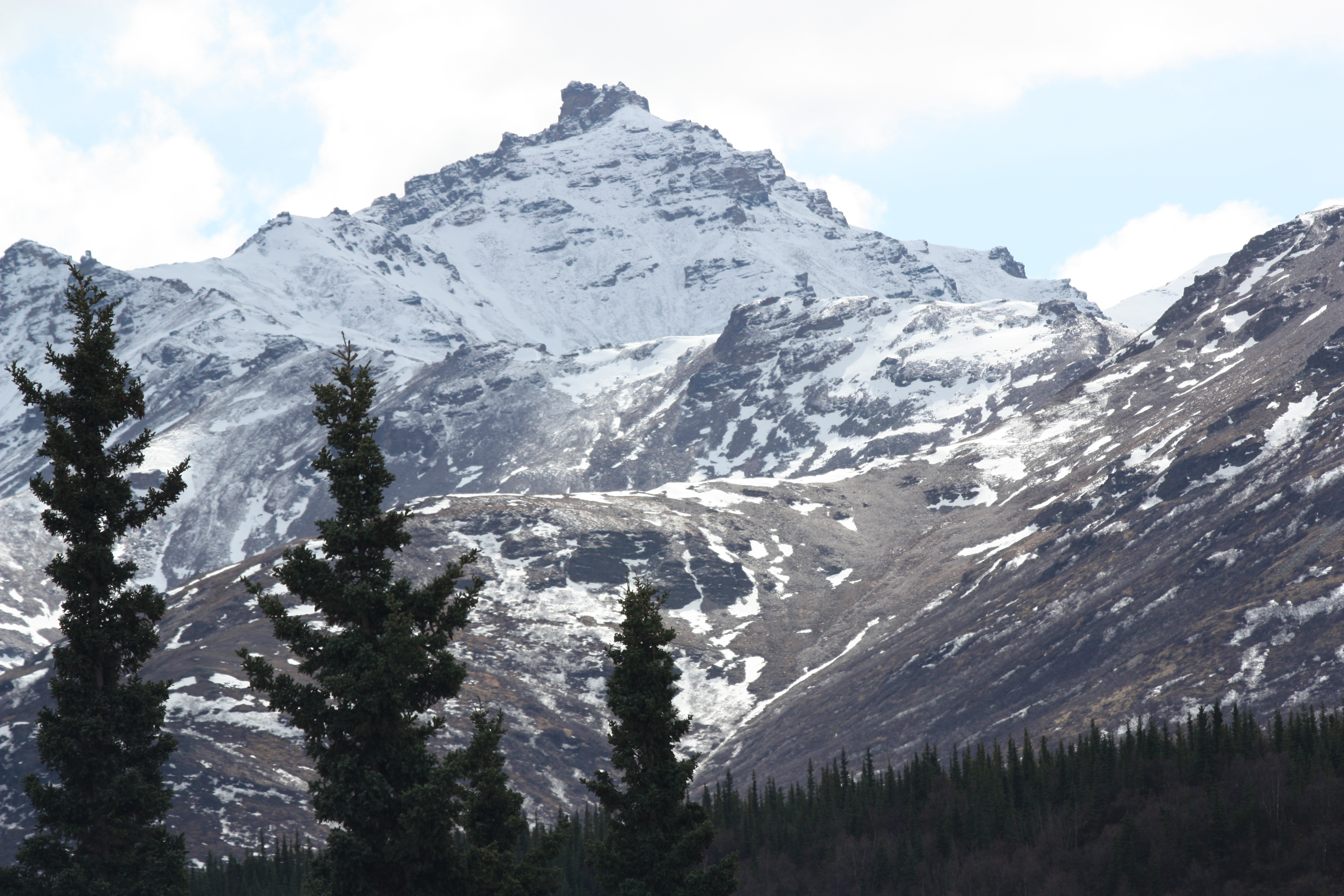

Highest point
- Elevation: 5,716 ft (1,742 m)
- Prominence: 498 ft (152 m)
- Parent peak: Fang Mountain (6,736 ft)
- Isolation: 1.35 mi (2.17 km)
- Coordinates: 63°46′23″N 149°00′32″W

Naming
- Etymology: John J. Healy

Geography
- Location within Alaska
- Interactive map of Mount Healy
- Country: United States
- State: Alaska
- Borough: Denali
- Protected area: Denali National Park
- Parent range: Alaska Range
- Topo map: USGS Healy D-5

Climbing
- Easiest route: Trail, scrambling

Mount Healy, also known in Denaʼina language as Dlel Neelghu Nodaadlghunee (meaning "mountains that are joined together"), is a 5,716-foot (1,742 meter) elevation mountain summit located in the Alaska Range, in Denali National Park and Preserve, in Alaska, United States. It is situated immediately northwest of park headquarters and six miles (9.7 km) south of Healy. The George Parks Highway and Alaska Railroad traverse the eastern base of this mountain as each passes through the Nenana River Gorge. Mount Healy's nearest neighbor, Sugar Loaf Mountain, is set 5.2 miles (8.4 km) to the east across the gorge, and the nearest higher peak is Fang Mountain, 16.2 mi (26 km) to the south-southwest. Mount Healy is a nine-mile-long, east–west trending ridge system of mostly loose rock with jagged peaks and spires. Vegetation ranges from boreal forest at the base all the way up to barren alpine ridges and snowfields at the top. This area is very popular for day hikes due to its close proximity to the park entrance. This mountain and the town are named after John J. Healy (1840–1908), manager of the North American Trading and Transportation Company. This geographical feature's name was reported in 1921 by Mabry Abbey on his survey map of the boundaries of Mount McKinley National Park.

== Climate ==
Based on the Köppen climate classification, Mount Healy is located in a subarctic climate zone with long, cold, snowy winters, and mild summers. Winter temperatures can drop below −10 °F with wind chill factors below −20 °F. The months May through June offer the most favorable weather for climbing or viewing. Precipitation runoff from the mountain drains into tributaries of the Nenana River, which in turn is part of the Tanana River drainage basin.

== Gallery ==
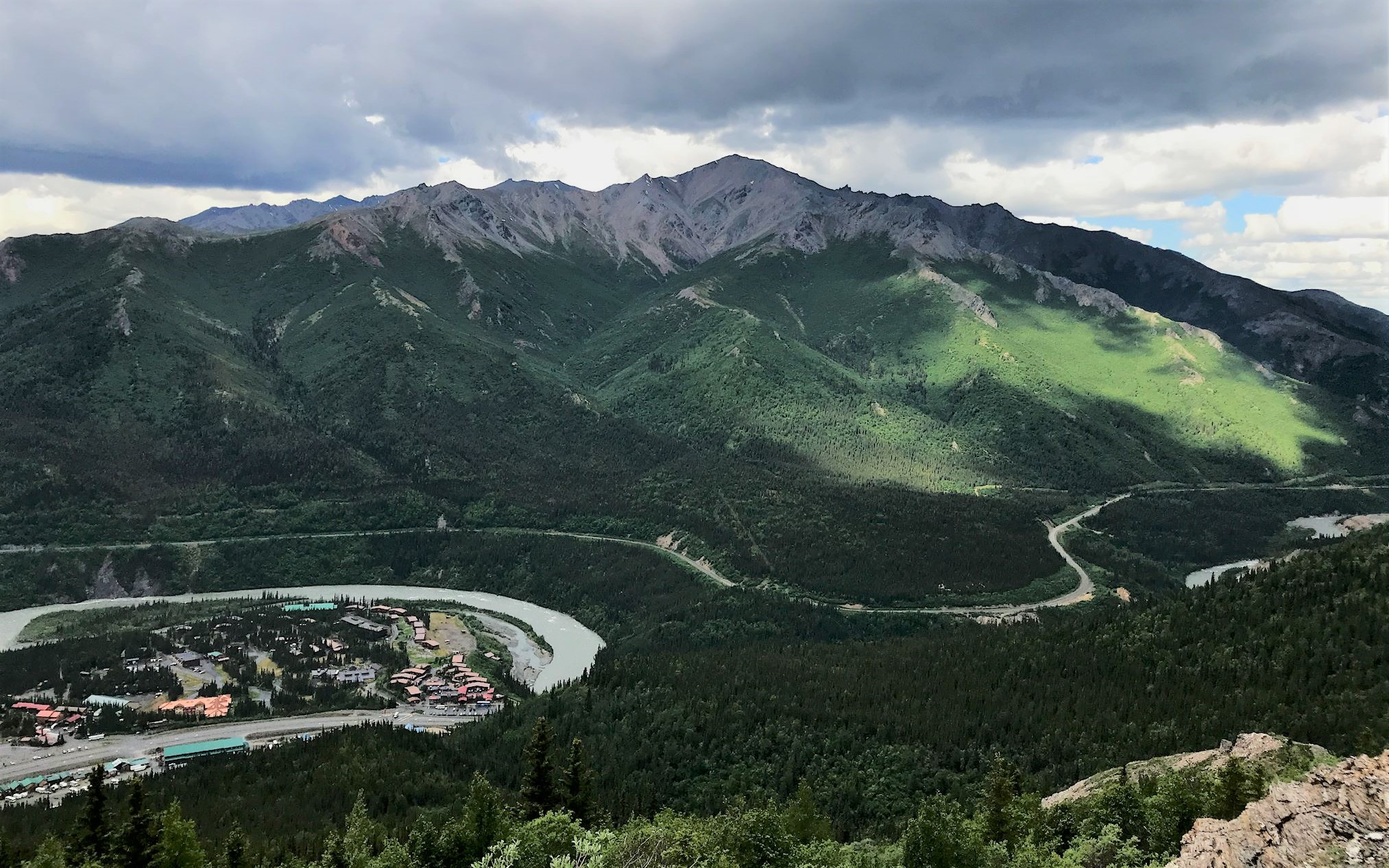
Southeast aspect, from Sugar Loaf Mountain

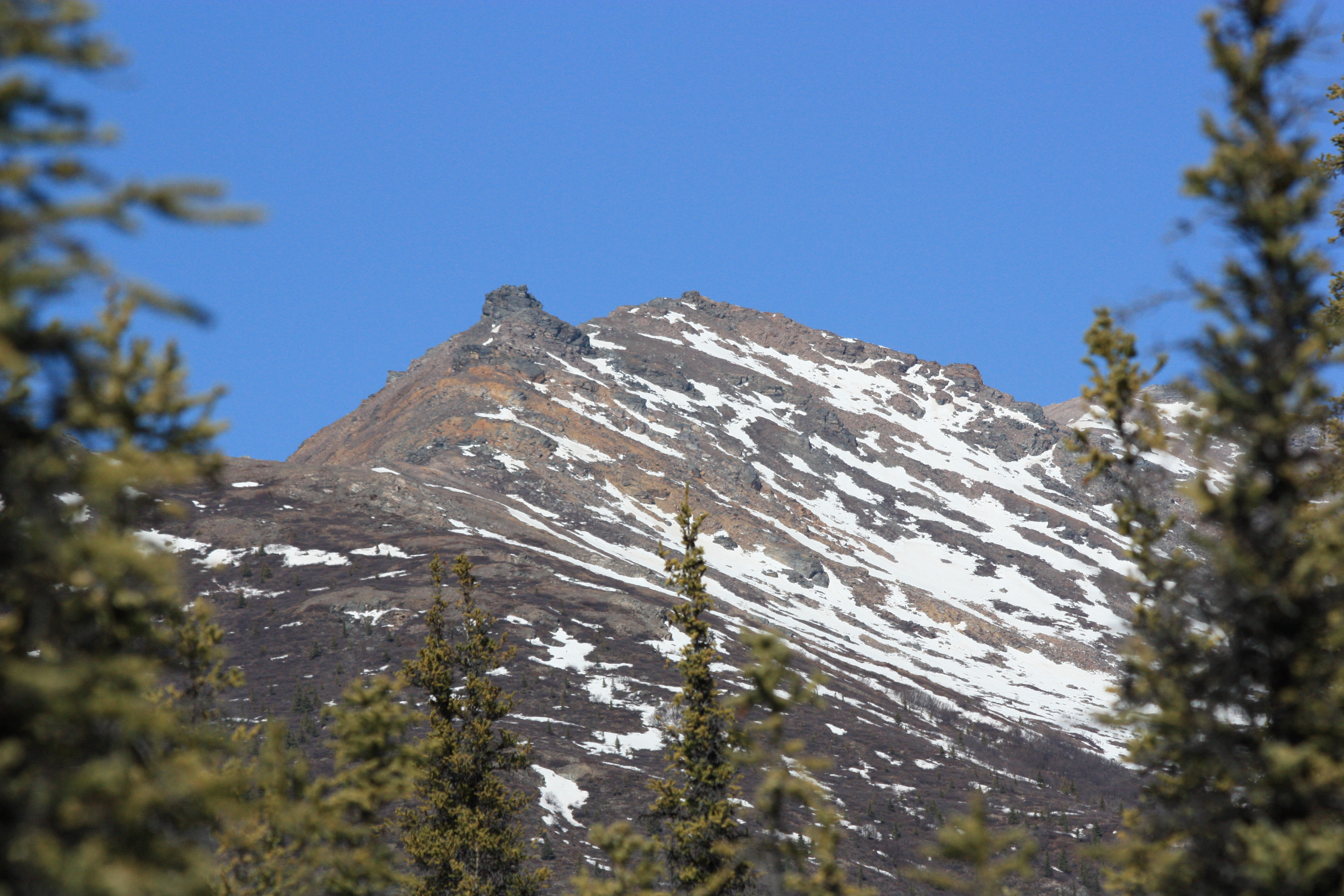

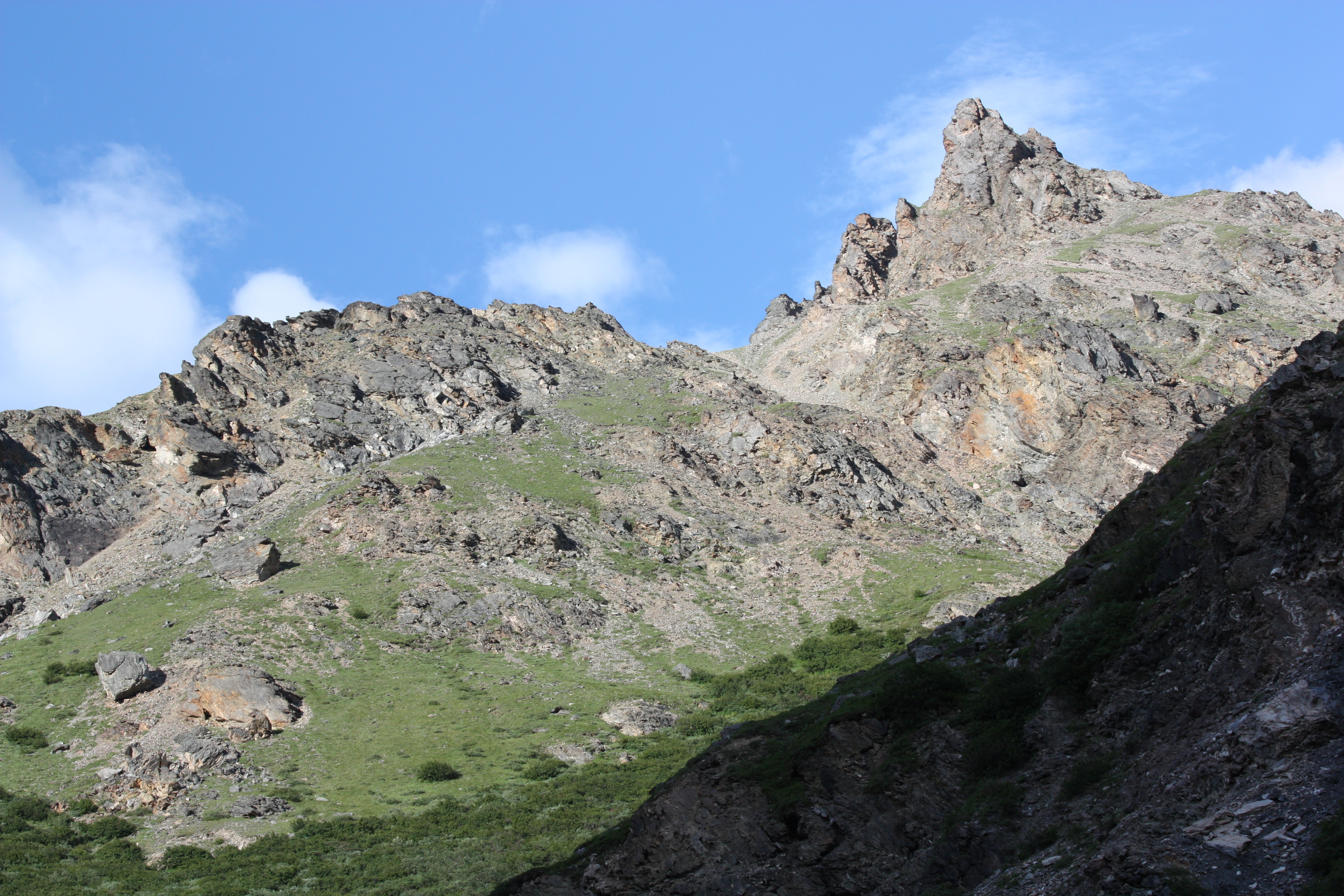

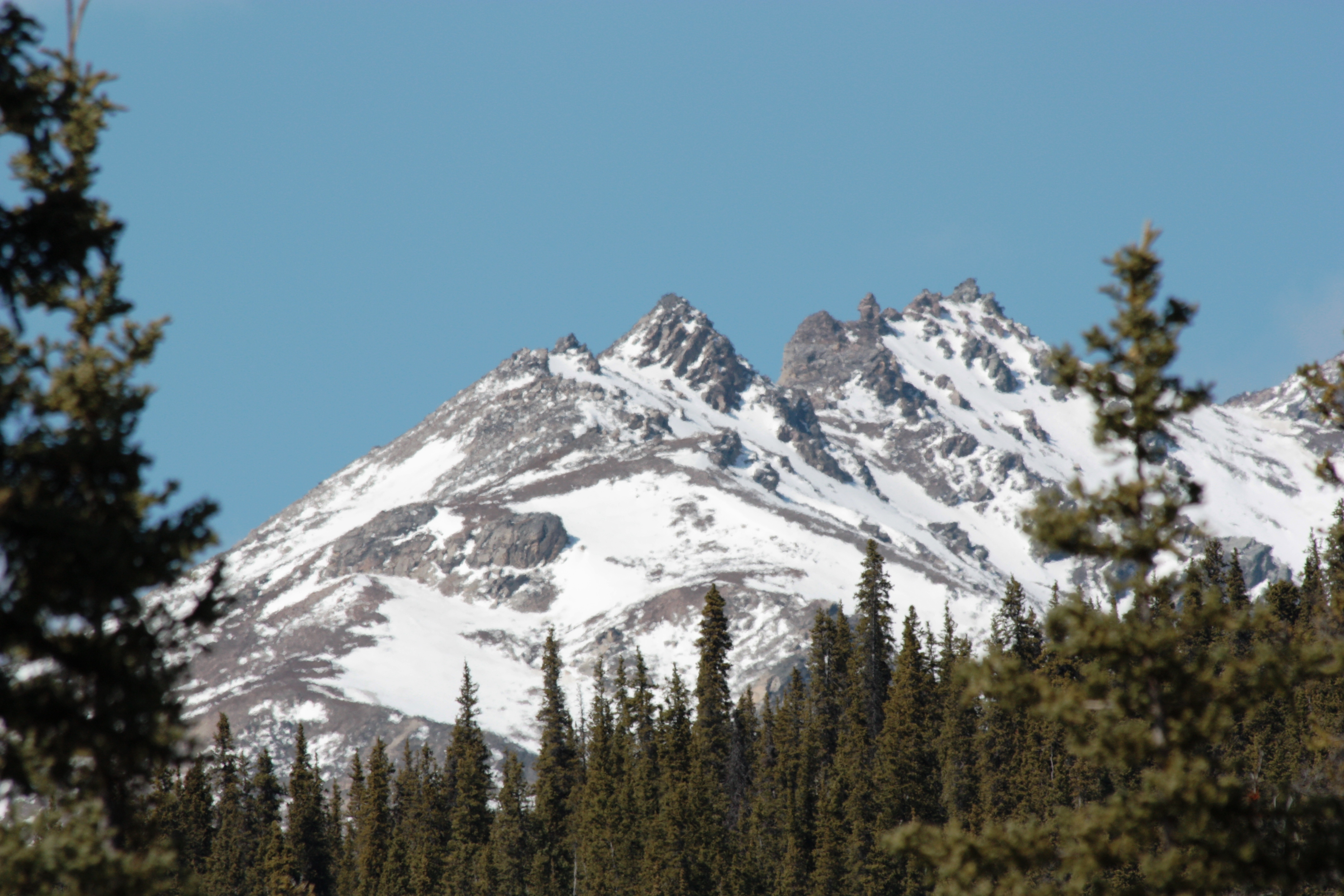

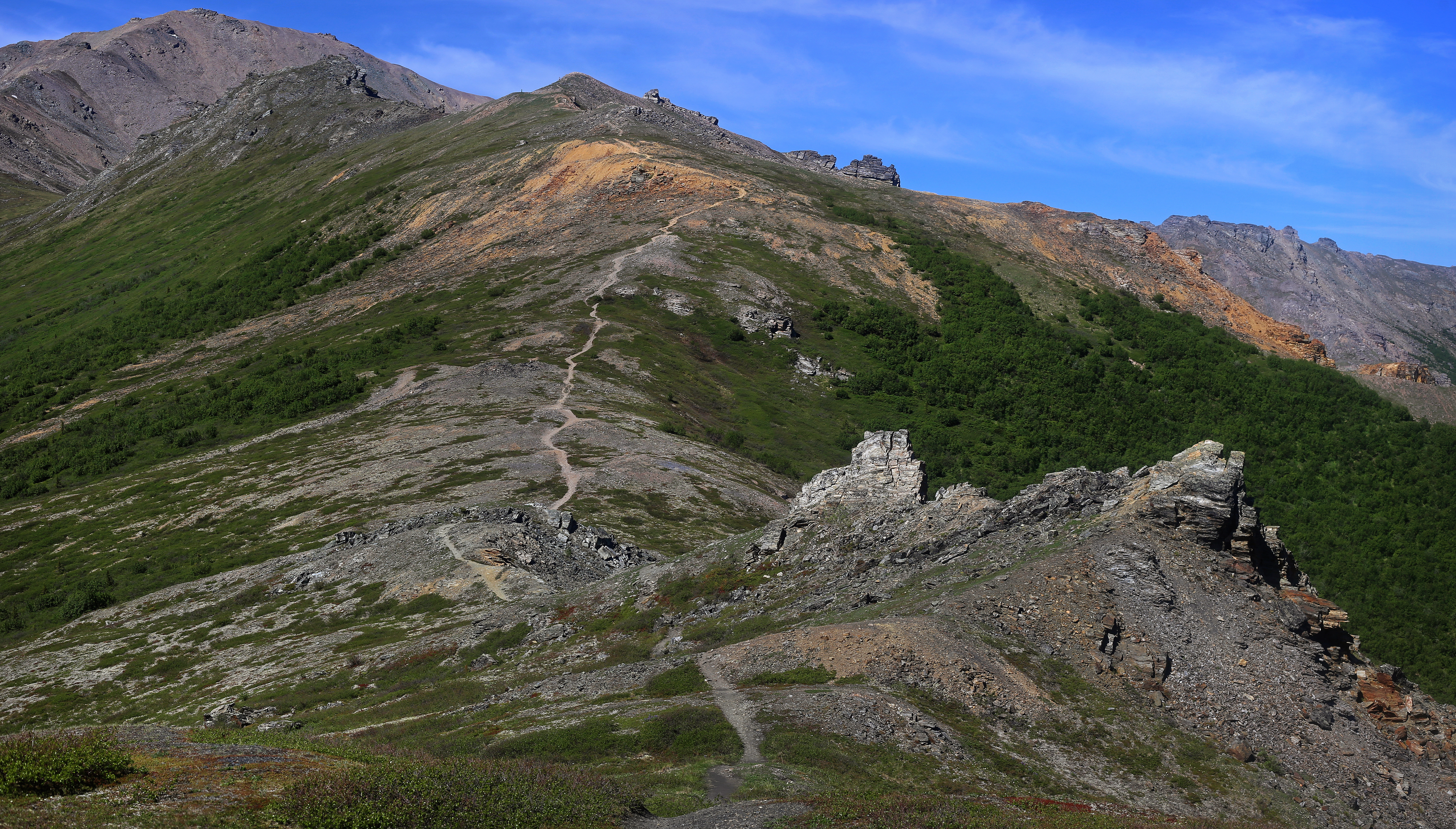

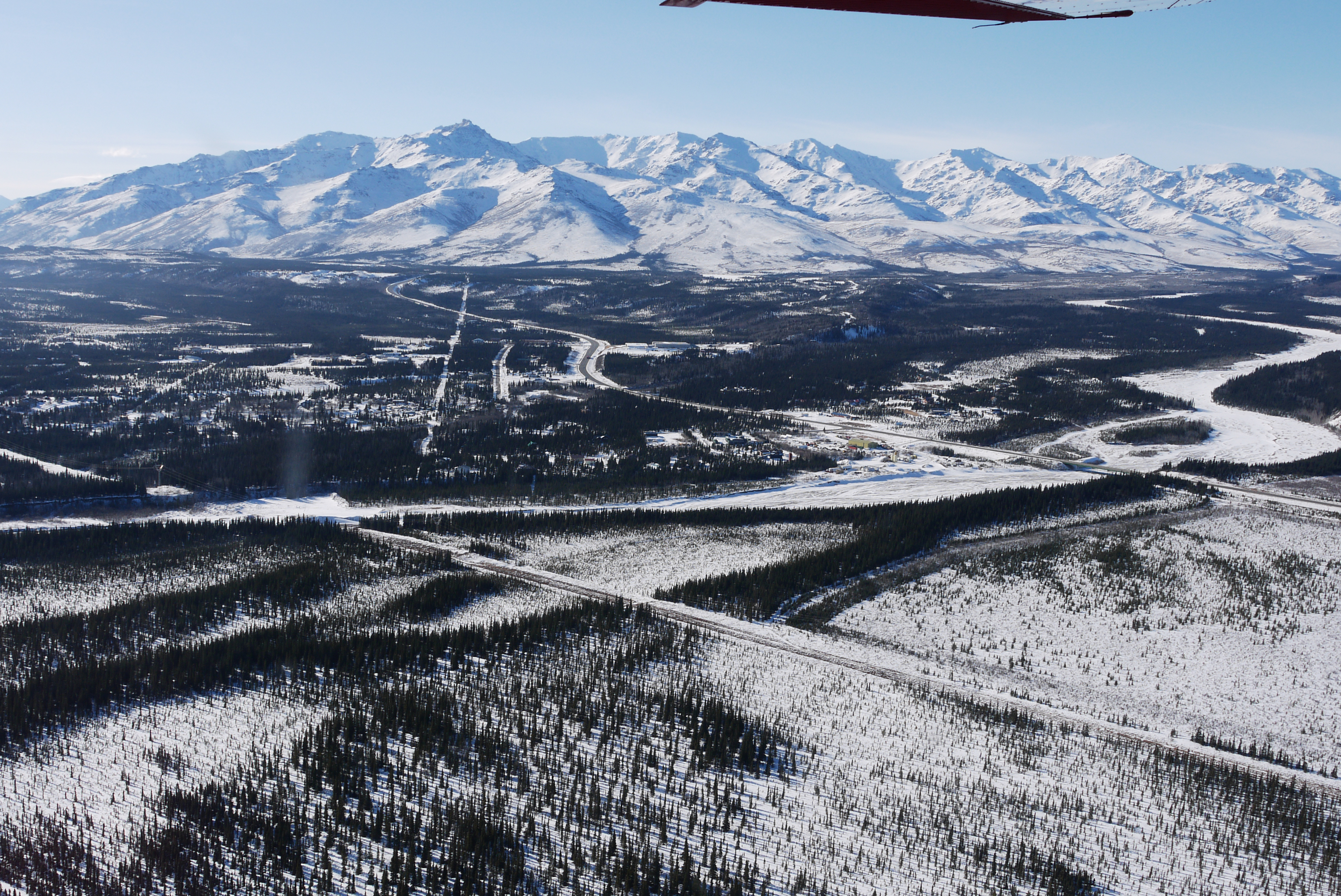
North aspect of Mt. Healy with town of Healy below, to left

== See also ==
- List of mountain peaks of Alaska
- Geology of Alaska
