= Jeric T =

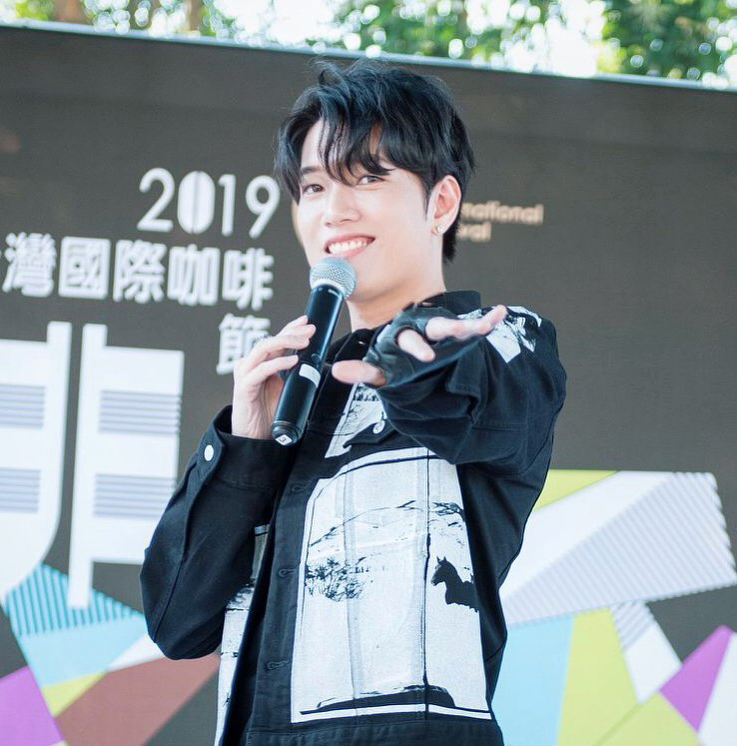
- Jeric performs to crowd of 4000 in 2019

Background information
- Born: Jeric Tan; 14 March 1984 (age 42); Singapore
- Genres: Pop, alternative hip hop, soul, fusion, contemporary R&B
- Occupations: Singer-songwriter, record producer, actor
- Instruments: Vocals, guitar, keyboard
- Years active: 2008–present
- Label: (2010–2012) HJ Records (2010–2012)
- Website: www.jerictan.com

Jeric Tan (traditional Chinese: 陳傑瑞; simplified Chinese: 陈杰瑞; pinyin: Chén Jiérùi; Wade–Giles: Chen Chieh-rui; born 14 March 1984), better known by his stage name Jeric T, is a Singaporean singer-songwriter and record producer. He founded and created the gaming platforms Zion, ZincPlay and DotaPod.

Jeric is from a family of Chinese opera actors and has been in touch with music from a young age. He was discovered by renowned singer-songwriter, Shaun Yu (永邦), in 2001, in a chanced meeting. After a few months of stint at record studios and production houses, Jeric decided to give up his studies, despite exceptional grades and standing (Dean's List Candidate, 8th in the School of InfoComm Technology, Ngee Ann Polytechnic), to pursue a musical career.

During this time, he became pals with Gary Chaw, and even wrote for him. Jeric began producing songs for other artists, and traveled countries including Singapore, Malaysia, Hong Kong, China and most notably Taiwan. He has also collaborated several times with Coldplay's producer, Danton Supple.

In August 2010, he released his debut album, Absolutely Jeric (Chinese:絕對傑瑞). Although plagued by poor marketing and exposure, the album generated hits like Disbelief (Chinese:我不相信), Venice Tears (Chinese:為你濕的淚), White Cat (Chinese:白貓), which peaked at number seven on Channel [V] Top 20, and number twenty-eight on G-Music Top 100 songs of 2010. The album was launched in Taiwan only.

Jeric's music is noted for displaying a wide variety of styles and influences, and contains elements of many different musical genres. As a child, he was highly influenced by artists such as Emil Chau and Jay Chou and would often practice singing to these artists songs. Jeric also incorporates Blues and Soul inspired sounds into his work. Chris Yu renowned singer-songwriter, referred to Jeric as having "one of the best voices he has heard in years" after chancing upon his live singing on a radio show.

== Life and career ==
=== 1986–2006: Early life and beginnings ===
Jeric was born Jeric Tan and raised in the Toa Payoh neighborhood of Singapore, by parents Tan Buck Hoe and Tay Chye Geok, of Chinese descent.

=== Collaboration ===
Jeric has collaborated with various artists and producers. Some notable collaborations are with Coldplay's producer, Danton Supple. The first collaboration was for the song, "What's up with me" by Tan Weiwei. With the second song, a track in the Girls album.

=== Producer ===
In 2012, at the age of 26, Jeric produced a full album for a girl band, becoming the youngest album producer in Taiwan. In 2014, he produced for another girl-group, 2*Sweet, producing the single, "Home Party". In 2013, he became the pioneer for "Ballad Electronica" (a.k.a. Progressive House), taking the leap into EDM in the Chinese region.

=== Music ===
- 2019/05/10: Jeric releases a movie theme song "OUTTA MY MIND" for the movie, "Fragments of Summer" . The song contains three languages, namely Chinese, English and a Chinese Dialect. Jeric has a cameo role in the movie.
- 2019/03/14: Jeric releases a limited edition of his debut album, "ABSOLUTELY JERIC". This album is a collaborative work among many masters in the Chinese music industry – Joshua Lin for his music videos, Lu Shaocun for music arrangements, Shaun Yu for music production, and Hannah Quinlivan as starring actress for his music video. This edition was also a birthday gift to his fans.
- 2018/12/17: Jeric releases a new Red Heart Association theme song, "UNDYING LOVE" This song was originally written by Jeric for Jing Chang in her 2012 album.
- 2018/11/25: Jeric releases television series, "Kira Kira in the Life" theme song, "MY HEART STILL BEATS FOR YOU"
- 2018/7/11: Jeric releases his "Ballad Electronica" (a.k.a. House EDM) track, "CANDLELIGHT" in collaboration with Austin Leeds, who has produced for Avicii, Paul van Dyk and Markus Schulz.
- 2017/12/27: Jeric releases part 2 of his series of light love songs, "FUTURE LOVE" following the success of "LOVE YOU MORE" which top KKBOX charts Top 20 songs for a full season.
- 2017/2/14: Jeric releases theme song for the television series "About Is Love", a new song called "LOVE YOU MORE" Media writes about his vocals, describing them as "Instant Tear-jerker" . The cast to the television series includes 彦希、许晓诺、蔡乙嘉、胡文喆、杨欣颖、李心博、付乐莹、周耀。The song also helped bring the television series to the top 10 of the charts in China for the year 2018.
- 2016/6/15: Jeric releases a new movie theme song, after a 5-year hiatus. The song "A Million Times" was the theme song for the movie, 終極舞班, whose cast includes 翁滋蔓、邱昊奇、Korean boy group Cross Gene's Casper.
- 2016/5/4: Jeric releases a cover in collaboration with his good friend, Kelly Poon, in JERIC陳傑瑞/潘嘉麗 – 《Always 對唱》 中文版
- 2016/2/4: Jeric releases a new song "Real-world Superman" as CABCY's ambassador. G.E.M. was also involved with the project 反霸凌聯盟慈善團體CABCY, raising funds for the organization. A lyric video version of the song was also released. JERIC陳傑瑞《Real-world Superman 現實超人》中英文版
- 2015/9/9: Jeric composes and directs for the new song "CHAMPIONS" 陳傑瑞 -《是英雄的站出來》 . This song was in collaboration with League of Legends and is the first dual-screen music video in the Chinese/Asia region.
- 2015/4/18: Jeric releases a record-breaking cover for See You Again in his rendition, JERIC 陳傑瑞-See you again《再見》 中文版 . Amassing more than 200,000,000 (200 million) views within 2 months in the Asia region.
- 2014/6/19: Jeric produces and sings on his song for Wu Yongbin – 陳傑瑞，吳勇濱 -《三個人的星系》
- 2013/10: Jeric writes a hit song for Andrew Tan 陳勢安, "Do You Hear Me" 陳勢安 《你聽見了嗎》[
- 2013/4/28: Jeric produces for actress 陳子玄 《蜜蜂與蜂蜜》
- 2013/1/20: Jeric produces a duet song with actress 陳傑瑞，黃甄妮 -《燕窩城堡》
- 2012/12/28: Jeric produces a 10-track album for girl group – GIRLS.
- 2012/9/21: Jeric writes a new track for Jing Chang 張芸京
- 2011/12: Jeric writes a new hit song for Tan Weiwei in "What's wrong with me" 谭维维 -《我是怎麼了》
- 2011/11/1: Jeric produces multiple tracks for the city government of Taichung in the film, 愛在山海花都 with soundtracks "Happiness Wanted", and "I will find you".
- 2010/8/14: Jeric releases debut album "ABSOLUTELY JERIC".
- 2007/6/15: Jeric writes song for girlgroup, Baby Monkiz in Baby Monkiz -《異想天開》

=== Music videos ===
- Jeric T – I Don't Believe It feat. Hannah Quinlivan
- Jeric T – Venice Tears
- Jeric T – Baby
- Jeric T – Happiness Wanted
- Jeric T – MY HEART STILL BEATS FOR YOU" (Kira Kira in my Life Theme Song)
- Jeric T – CANDLELIGHT Official Video
- Jeric T – LOVE YOU MORE
- Jeric vs. Jenny Huang – Swallow's Nest
- 陳子玄 – Honey & Bees
- Jeric T – Baby Live
- Jeric vs. 吳勇濱 – Three Way Galaxy
- Jeric feat. Abin – Champions (League of Legends Asia Theme Song)
- Jeric T -Real-world Superman
- Jeric T – A MILLION TIMES

=== Albums ===
Album name	Release date
ABSOLUTELY JERIC	14 August 2010
ABSOLUTELY JERIC 2019	14 March 2019

=== Television theme songs ===
Series	Song type	Song title	Artist	Composer	Air date
Future Mr. Right	Main Theme Song	Future Champion (original song: CHAMPIONS)	JERIC陳傑瑞	陳傑瑞Jeric	LeTV (China) 2015/7/21 – Daily 12 pm; 中視數位台 (Taiwan) 2016/6/15 – Daily Monday to Friday 22:00; 中天娛樂台 (Taiwan) 2016/7/5 – Daily Monday to Friday 20:00
About Is Love	Main Theme Song	愛你多一些 LOVE YOU MORE	JERIC陳傑瑞	陳傑瑞Jeric	腾讯视频 中国大陆 2018年12月3日 – 非会员每周一－三20：00更新2集，会员每周一提前看下周
Kira Kira in my Life	Main Theme Song	MY HEART STILL BEATS FOR YOU	JERIC陳傑瑞	陳傑瑞Jeric	Vidol (台灣) 2018年11月1日-每週六晚間九點首播; 三立都會台 (台灣) 2018年12月23日週日晚間六至八點播出
