= Fang Mountain =

Mountain in Alaska, United States

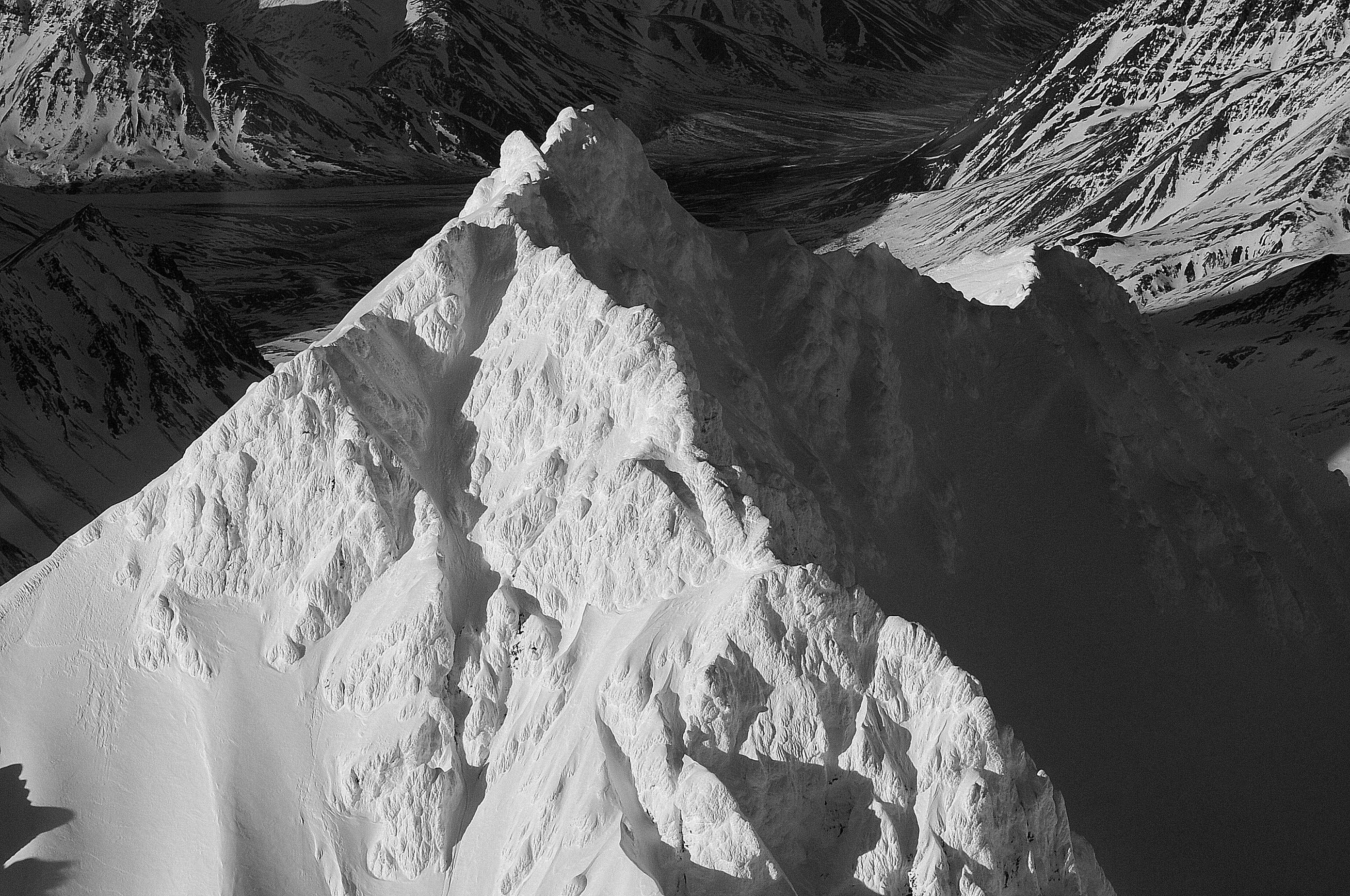
- Fang Mountain covered by rime ice

Highest point
- Elevation: 6,736 ft (2,053 m)
- Prominence: 1,936 ft (590 m)
- Parent peak: Mount Pendleton (7,605 ft)
- Isolation: 7.33 mi (11.80 km)
- Coordinates: 63°33′34″N 149°11′11″W

Geography
- Location within Alaska
- Interactive map of Fang Mountain
- Location: Denali Borough; Alaska, United States
- Parent range: Alaska Range
- Topo map: USGS Healy C-5

Fang Mountain is a 6,736 ft (2,050 m) summit located in the Alaska Range, in Denali National Park and Preserve, in Alaska, United States. It is situated 15 mi (24 km) southwest of park headquarters and 14 mi (23 km) northwest of Cantwell, near the headwaters of the Savage River. This peak's local descriptive name was published in 1952 by the United States Geological Survey. Rarely climbed, Fang Mountain is an unattractive climbing destination because of dangerous, loose, rotten rock and a long approach.

== Climate ==
Based on the Köppen climate classification, Fang Mountain is located in a subarctic climate zone with long, cold, snowy winters, and mild summers. Temperatures can drop below −20 °C with wind chill factors below −30 °C. The months May through June offer the most favorable weather for climbing or viewing. Precipitation runoff from the mountain drains north into Savage River, east into Riley Creek, or west into the Sanctuary River, which are all in the Tanana River drainage basin.

== Gallery ==
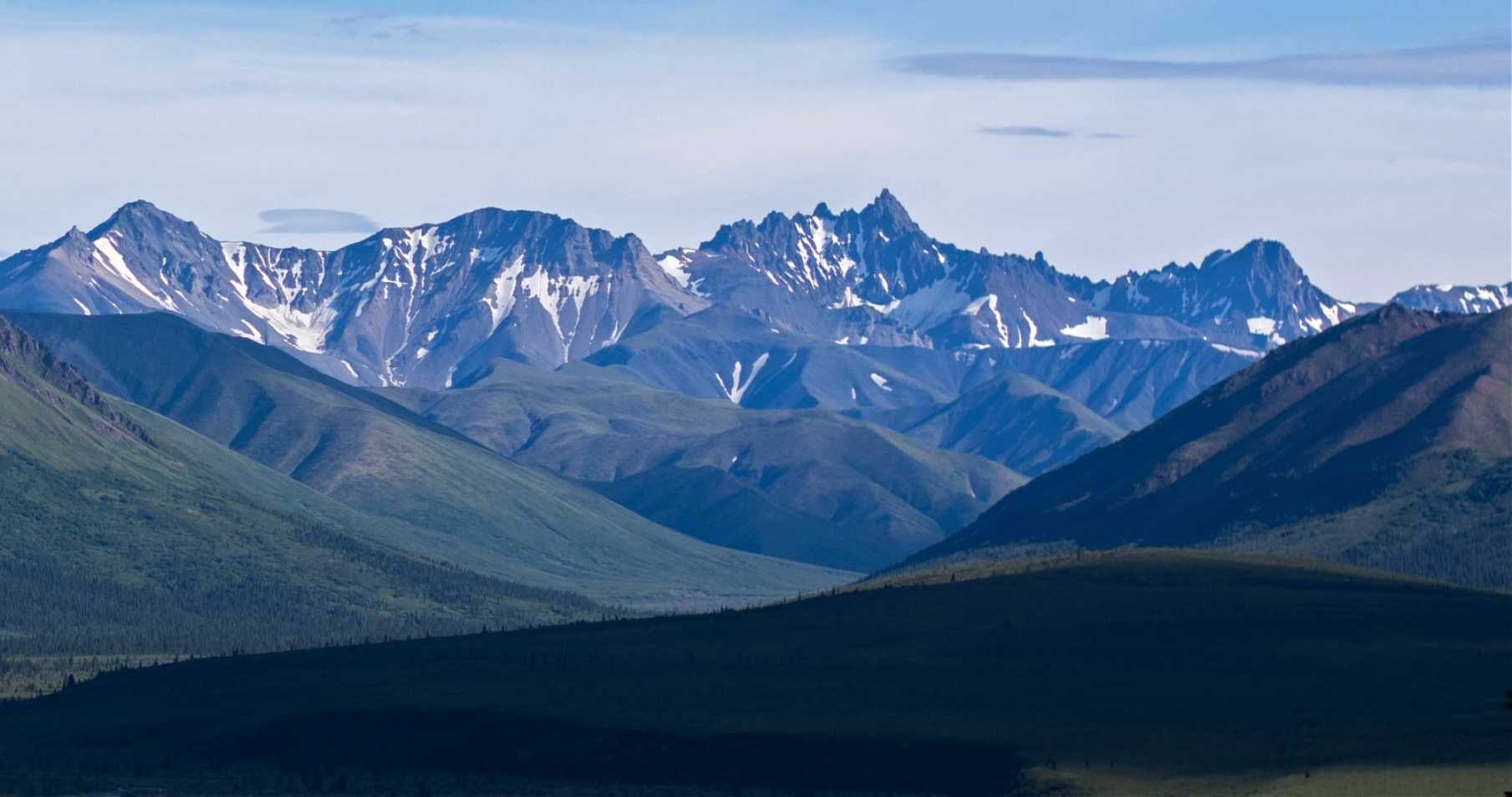
Looking south at Fang Mountain from Denali Park Road

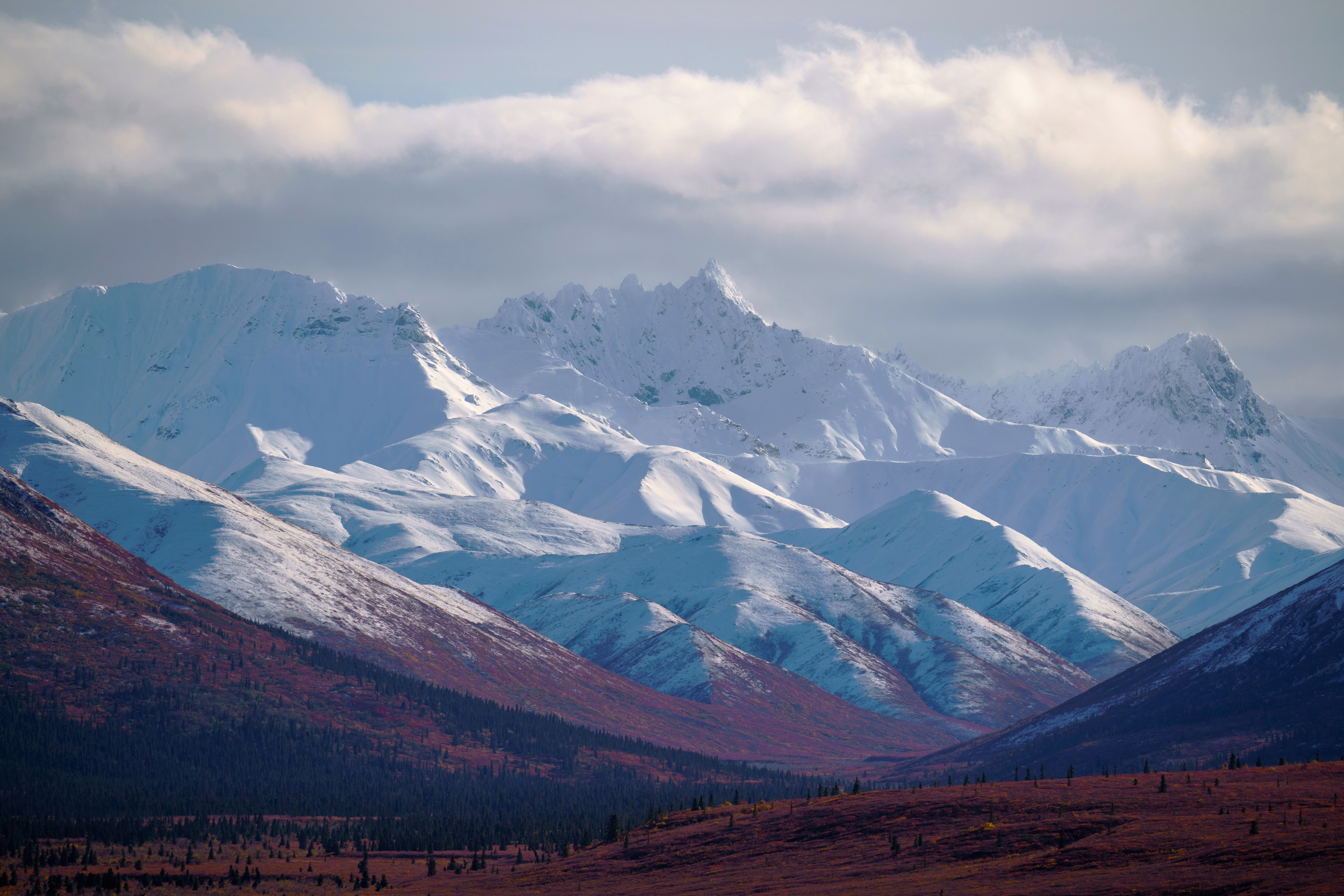
North aspect

== See also ==
- List of mountain peaks of Alaska
- Geology of Alaska
