= Robbing Mussolini =

2022 Italian film

- Italian: Rapiniamo il Duce
- Directed by: Renato De Maria
- Written by: Renato De Maria; Federico Gnesini; Valentina Strada
- Produced by: Matilde Barbagallo; Angelo Barbagallo
- Starring: Pietro Castellitto; Matilda De Angelis; Tommaso Ragno; Isabella Ferrari; Alberto Astorri; Maccio Capatonda; Luigi Fedele; Filippo Timi
- Cinematography: Gian Filippo Corticelli
- Edited by: Clelio Benevento
- Music by: David Holmes
- Distributed by: Netflix
- Release date: 26 October 2022
- Running time: 99 minutes
- Country: Italy
- Language: Italian

Robbing Mussolini (Italian: Rapiniamo il Duce) is a 2022 Italian historical action comedy film directed by Renato De Maria.

== Plot ==
In the closing days of World War II, Pietro "Isola" Lamberti is a contraband dealer seeking to raise enough money to escape Fascist-controlled Milan along with his girlfriend, Yvonne, a singer who is also the mistress of sadistic fascist minister Achille Borsalino. Isola and his colleagues Marcello and Amedeo intercept a coded message from the fascists ordering the evacuation of a large stash of treasures looted by the fascist regime to Switzerland. The three conspire to steal the treasure, hidden in a secure quarter of Milan known as the Black Zone, and recruit runner Hessa, anarchist bomber Molotov, and former racer Fabbri, hoping to complete the heist within a week.

Isola is caught while leaving from a date with Yvonne by Borsalino and his aide, Leonida, and is warned to stay away from her. Despite this Isola convinces Yvonne to steal Borsalino's personal stamp to enable Isola to enter the Black Zone. While doing so, Yvonne is taken by an unaware Borsalino to see the treasure herself, saying that he wants to take her abroad as he has tired of his wife, Nora, who in turn has an affair with Leonida. During a performance at her club, Yvonne collapses, prompting Isola to rush to the stage. He is caught by Borsalino and Leonida, causing a shootout in which Isola and Yvonne escape with Fabbri's help. At Isola's hideout, Yvonne reveals that she is pregnant with his child. Nora arrives and reveals that she had been spying on Yvonne and Isola's group the entire time before blackmailing Isola to hand half of the fascist loot to her and stage the heist within 24 hours.

Isola's group infiltrate the Black Zone at night, with Hessa orchestrating a false air raid alert and Molotov rigging the complex with explosives in the dark. However, the heist goes awry when Isola, disguised as a prisoner, is held up by wary guards, causing the alarm to activate prematurely. In the chaos, a shootout breaks out and Molotov is mortally shot, but manages to detonate the explosives before he dies. The panicked guards flee to the bunker, enabling Isola and his remaining comrades to make off with the loot aboard a truck. At the same time, Yvonne is captured by Borsalino, who is alerted to the heist, but the latter is bludgeoned to death by Nora.

Arriving at their rendezvous, Nora double-crosses Isola and demands the entire loot in exchange for Yvonne. After a Mexican standoff, Isola backs down, but Nora reneges and takes Yvonne away. As Nora orders Leonida and his men to execute Isola's group, a squad of partisans arrive and rescue them following a shootout, while Nora and Leonida escape aboard the truck with Yvonne and the loot. Fabbri finds a racecar nearby and accompanies Isola in chasing the truck to the Alps. Isola attacks and knocks down Leonida, who is in an escort vehicle, while Fabbri outflanks the truck and shoots the driver, causing the truck to plunge into a lake. Isola and Yvonne emerge from the water to Fabbri's relief, as a radio broadcast announces the surrender of Axis forces in Italy. In a mid-credits scene, Nora is also shown to have survived and is hiding in a forest.

== Cast ==
- Pietro Castellitto as Pietro Lamberti "Isola"
- Matilda De Angelis as Gianna Ascari "Yvonne"
- Tommaso Ragno as Marcello Davoli
- Isabella Ferrari as Nora Cavalieri
- Alberto Astorri as Molotov
- Maccio Capatonda as Giovanni Fabbri
- Luigi Fedele as Amedeo
- Coco Rebecca Edogamhe as Hessa
- Maurizio Lombardi as Marquis Camillo Serbelloni
- Lorenzo De Moor as Ahab
- Luca Lo Destro as Maghreb
- Filippo Timi as Federal Secretary Achille Borsalino
- Giorgio Antonini as Leonida, Borsalino's henchman

== Reception ==
In his review for Cineuropa, Davide Abbatescianni defined the film as "another missed opportunity." He highlighted how "the acting performances, which are all sadly below par, are heavily constricted by weak writing when it comes to character construction, and superficial when exploring conflict," adding that "the film’s narrative subplots are disappointingly predictable."

== See also ==
- List of Italian films of 2022
- Dongo Treasure
