= Wang Wenxue =

Chinese real estate developer

- Born: 1966 or 1967 (age 58–59)
- Education: Tsinghua University
- Occupation: Real estate developer
- Title: Chairman, China Fortune Land Development
- Spouse: Married

Wang Wenxue (Chinese: 王文学; born 1967) is a Chinese billionaire real estate developer, chairman of the publicly traded China Fortune Land Development (CFLD) based in Beijing, and focused on industrial parks.

== Early life ==
Wang was born in an "ordinary family without political connections". He completed his high school education in Langfang.

== Career ==
Wang started working for the local transport bureau, before started his own hotpot restaurant in 1992. The restaurant became a popular meeting place for local government officials, and the resulting connections meant he was able to enter the property refurbishment sector, before moving into property development.

In 1998, Wang founded China Fortune Land Development (CFLD). He is the chairman of CFLD.

By 2015, Wang was ranked seventh richest of China's property developer's with a net worth of $4 billion. As of September 2019, Wang has an estimated net worth of US$4.8 billion.

== Personal life ==
Wang is married, and lives in Beijing, China.

Wang owns the Chinese Super League football team Hebei China Fortune F.C. He earned an EMBA from Tsinghua University, and has attended advanced management courses at Peking University.

Wang is a member of the business group of the 12th Chinese People's Political Consultative Conference, and was a representative for Hebei Province at the 11th and 12th People's Congress.

In June 2016, Wang was elected to University of Southern California (USC) board of trustees.
