= Maserati: The Brothers =

Upcoming film by Robert Moresco

- Directed by: Robert Moresco
- Written by: Amanda Moresco; Stefano Torrisi
- Produced by: Andrea Iervolino
- Starring: Michele Morrone; Salvatore Esposito; Lorenzo De Moor; Anthony Hopkins; Andy García; Jessica Alba; Al Pacino
- Production companies: Andrea Iervolino Company; Bright White Light
- Distributed by: Notorious Pictures (Italy)
- Release date: 15 October 2026 (Italy)
- Countries: Italy; Canada; United Kingdom
- Language: English

Maserati: The Brothers is a biographical sports drama film directed by Robert Moresco about the Maserati brothers. It stars Michele Morrone, Salvatore Esposito, Lorenzo De Moor, Anthony Hopkins, Andy García, Jessica Alba, and Al Pacino.

It received a limited theatrical release in Italy on 15 October 2026.

== Cast ==
- Michele Morrone as Alfieri Maserati
- Salvatore Esposito as Bindo Maserati
- Lorenzo De Moor as Carlo Maserati
- Anthony Hopkins as Luca Antonelli
- Andy García as Mr. Rossini
- Jessica Alba as Sandra
- Al Pacino as Vincenzo Vaccaro
- Maya Talem
- Victoria Sophia
- Annie Bezikian
- Gina La Piana
- Tatiana Luter
- Alessandro Egger

== Production ==
=== Development ===
The film was announced on 8 March 2023, with Andrea Iervolino producing. Later that month, Robert Moresco was announced as the film's director.

=== Casting ===
Anthony Hopkins, Michele Morrone, Andy García, and Jessica Alba joined the cast in October 2024. Salvatore Esposito, Lorenzo De Moor, Maya Talem, Victoria Sophia, and Annie Bezikian were announced as cast members in December 2024. Al Pacino, Gina La Piana, and Tatiana Luter joined the cast in May 2025.

=== Filming ===
Principal photography began on 2 December 2024, while a second phase of filming began in June 2025. Filming locations included Modena and Bologna, as well as Cinecittà Studios in Rome. Up to 60 cars were built for the film, reconstructed from Maserati models from the 1920s and 1930s, including the Maserati Tipo 26.

=== Music ===
In November 2024, Diane Warren was reported to compose an original song for the film. The song, "One Right Here," was revealed to be sung by Andrea Bocelli and Jennifer Hudson. Bocelli announced the song and performed it live for the first time with Hudson and Warren at his concert at the Hollywood Bowl on September 15, 2026. The song was released on October 2, 2026.

== Release ==
During production, Andrea Iervolino Company released three promotional images from the shoot in December 2024. Magenta Light Studios acquired the American distribution rights to the film in June 2025.

A trailer was released on 26 August 2026. The film received a limited theatrical release in Italy on 15 October 2026. The film will receive a limited release on 29 January 2027, in the United States.
