= Lorenzo de Moor =

Dutch-Italian actor (born 1994)

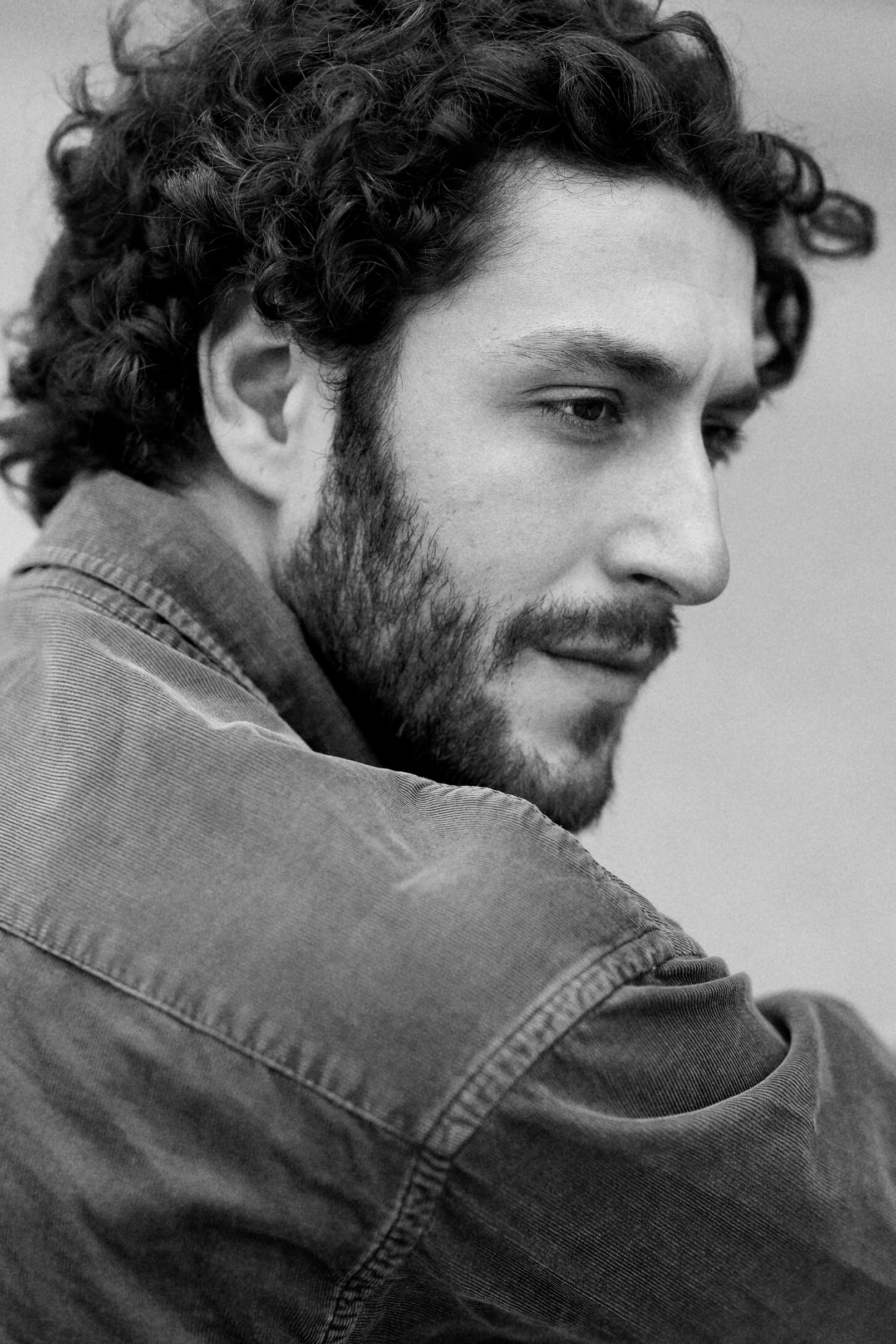
- Lorenzo de Moor in 2024
- Born: 21 October 1994; The Hague, Netherlands
- Education: Stella Adler Academy
- Occupation: Actor
- Years active: 2016-present

Lorenzo de Moor is a Dutch-Italian film and television actor. Born in The Hague, he grew up in Tuscany and trained at the Stella Adler Academy in New York. His films roles include Another Simple Favor (2025).

== Early life ==
He was born in The Hague, Netherlands. His father is Dutch and his mother is Italian. His father Jasper de Moor, grandfather Guido de Moor, grandmother Trins Snijders, and uncle all worked as actors, and his mother was a costume designer. He lived in Prato in the Tuscany region of Italy and started acting at the age of 15 years-old with director Cristina Pezzoli. He trained in New York at the Stella Adler Academy, graduating in 2016, after which he moved back to Italy, and based himself in Rome.

== Career ==
He had an early film role as Egyptian émigré Nazeer in the 2019 Polish drama Dolce Fine Giornata. He appeared in Italian series Pezzi unici on Italian broadcast channel Rai 1, directed by Cinzia TH Torrini, and set entirely in Florence. He also had a role in 2022 Italian historical comedy-drama film Robbing Mussolini.

In February 2024, he appeared in Dutch biographical drama series Patty, which premiered on the Dutch streaming service Videoland, about the life of Patty Brard in which he portrayed her second husband Carlo Nasi, with whom she had her daughter Priscilla. That year, he could also be seen in Brigands: The Quest for Gold, an Italian historical drama for streaming service Netflix. He portrayed Sebastian in docudrama Martin Scorsese Presents: The Saints in 2024.

In 2025, he could be seen in Paul Feig comedy thriller film Another Simple Favor. He has a role in British television series The Iris Affair. He will appear alongside Jessica Alba in the film Maserati: The Brothers, in which he portrays Carlo Maserati, the older brother of the family that founded the luxury car brand. He also has an upcoming role in the action film remake of Cliffhanger alongside Lily James.

== Partial filmography ==
Key
| † | Denotes works that have not yet been released |

| Year | Title | Role | Notes |
|---|---|---|---|
| 2016 | Newcomers | | TV film |
| 2019 | Dolce Fine Giornata | Nazeer | Film |
| 2019 | Pezzi unici | Lorenzo Bandinelli | 12 episodes |
| 2022 | Robbing Mussolini | Ahab | Film |
| 2024 | Brigands: The Quest for Gold | Muto | 6 episodes |
| 2024 | Patty | Carlo Nasi | 3 episodes |
| 2024 | Martin Scorsese Presents: The Saints | Sebastian | 1 episode |
| 2025 | Another Simple Favor | Matteo Bartolo | Feature film |
| 2025 | The Legend Hunters | Sergio Russo | Feature film |
| 2025 | The Iris Affair | Teo Solinas | 4 episodes |
| 2026 | You, Me & Tuscany | Matteo Costa | Feature film |
| 2026 | Maserati: The Brothers | Carlo Maserati | Feature film |
| 2027 | Cliffhanger † | TBA | Feature film |
| 2027 | The Resurrection of the Christ: Part One † | Andrew | Feature film |
