= Sugar Loaf Mountain (Alaska) =

Mountain of the Alaska Range in Alaska, United States

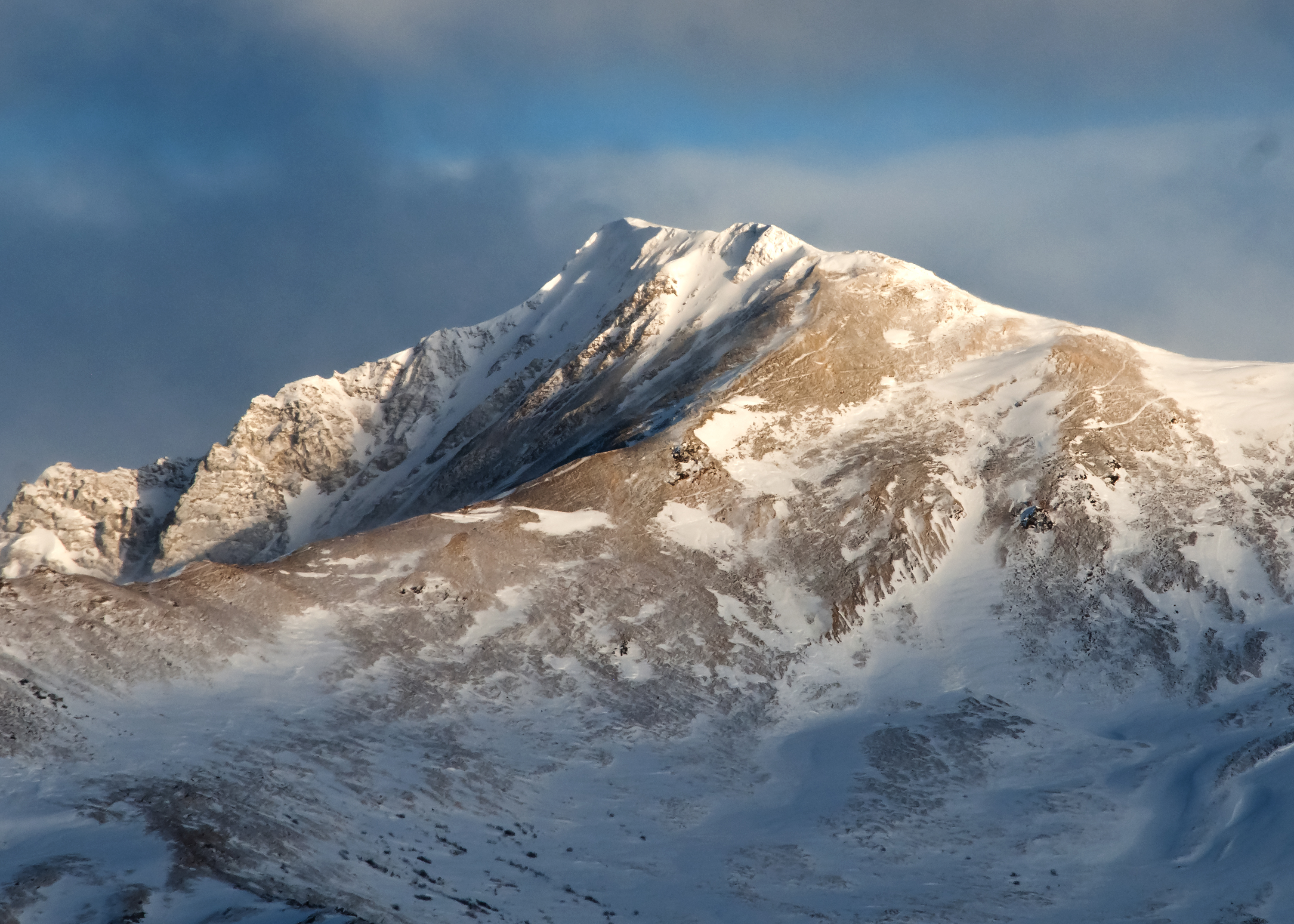

Highest point
- Elevation: 4,784 ft (1,458 m)
- Prominence: 384 ft (117 m)
- Parent peak: Mount Healy (5,716 ft)
- Isolation: 2.4 mi (3.9 km)
- Coordinates: 63°46′57″N 148°50′33″W

Geography
- Location within Alaska
- Location: Denali Borough; Alaska, United States
- Parent range: Alaska Range
- Topo map: USGS Healy D-4

Climbing
- Easiest route: Trail, scrambling

Sugar Loaf Mountain, also known as Sugar Mountain, is a 4,784 ft (1,460 m) summit located in the Alaska Range, near Denali National Park and Preserve, in Alaska, United States. It is situated six miles (9.7 km) northeast of park headquarters and six miles (9.7 km) southeast of Healy. The George Parks Highway and Alaska Railroad traverse the western base of this mountain as each passes through the Nenana River Gorge. Mount Healy, Sugar's nearest higher neighbor, is set 5.2 mi (8 km) to the west across the gorge. This peak's local descriptive name was published in 1950 by the United States Geological Survey.

== Climate ==
Based on the Köppen climate classification, Sugar Loaf Mountain is located in a subarctic climate zone with long, cold, snowy winters, and mild summers. Winter temperatures can drop below −20 °C with wind chill factors below −30 °C. The months May through June offer the most favorable weather for climbing or viewing. Precipitation runoff from the mountain drains into tributaries of the Nenana River, which in turn is part of the Tanana River drainage basin.

== See also ==
- List of mountain peaks of Alaska
- Geology of Alaska
