= China Fortune Land Development =

Chinese real estate company

- Company type: public
- Traded as: SSE: 600340; SSE 50 Component
- Industry: Real estate development
- Founder: Wang Wenxue
- Headquarters: Langfang, China (legal); Beijing, China (de facto)
- Revenue: ▲CN¥38.335 billion (2015)
- Operating income: ▲CN¥6.903 billion (2015)
- Net income: ▲CN¥4.834 billion (2015)
- Total assets: ▲CN¥168.623 billion (2015)
- Total equity: ▲CN¥13.527 billion (2015)
- Owner: China Fortune Land Development Holding (68.88%)
- Subsidiaries: Hebei F.C. (100%)
- Website: cfldcn.com
- Footnotes / references in consolidated basis

China Fortune Land Development Co., Ltd.
- Simplified Chinese: 华夏幸福基业股份有限公司
- Traditional Chinese: 華夏幸福基業股份有限公司
Transcriptions
Standard Mandarin
- Hanyu Pinyin: Huáxià xìngfú jīyè gǔfèn yǒuxiàn gōngsī

China Fortune Land Development Co., Ltd. is a publicly traded Chinese real estate developer, based in Beijing, headed by Wang Wenxue and focused on industrial parks. It purchased Chinese Super League club Hebei China Fortune F.C. on 27 January 2015. Wang Wenxue still the largest shareholder of the company via China Fortune Land Development Holding.

== Background ==
China Fortune Land Development's primary business is building and operating industrial parks and related real estate. Its significant projects include Gu'an High Tech Park in Hebei. China's central government has designated Gu'an High Tech Park as a "National Demonstration Public Private Partnership Project".

As of May 2015, Wang Wenxue has an estimated net worth of US$4.1 billion.

China Fortune Land Development was a constituent of the CSI 300 Index (index for large to medium-sized companies in the mainland China's stock exchanges) as well as its sub-index CSI 100 Index. Since June 2017, it also part of Shanghai Stock Exchange's blue chip index: SSE 50 Index.

In 2017, Caixin Weekly described China Fortune Land Development as a "city maker" due to the scale of its projects.

China Fortune Land Development in 2023 restructured 80% of its 219 billion yuan ($31.7 billion) debt through asset sales, restructuring offshore assets, setting up a trust fund, selling its real estate division and started making a profit.
