= Mount Pendleton =

Mountain in Alaska, United States

- Location within Alaska

Highest point
- Elevation: 7,605 ft (2,318 m)
- Coordinates: 63°24′45″N 149°42′48″W

Geography
- Location: Denali Borough, Alaska, United States
- Parent range: Alaska Range
- Topo map: USGS Healey B-6

Mount Pendleton is a 7,605-foot (2,318 m) mountain in the Alaska Range, in Denali National Park and Preserve, to the east-northeast of Denali. It lies above the Polychrome Glaciers. Mount Pendleton was named in 1961 by the U.S. Geological Survey for topographer Thomas Percy Pendleton.

== See also ==
- Mountain peaks of Alaska
