= Simon West =

English film director

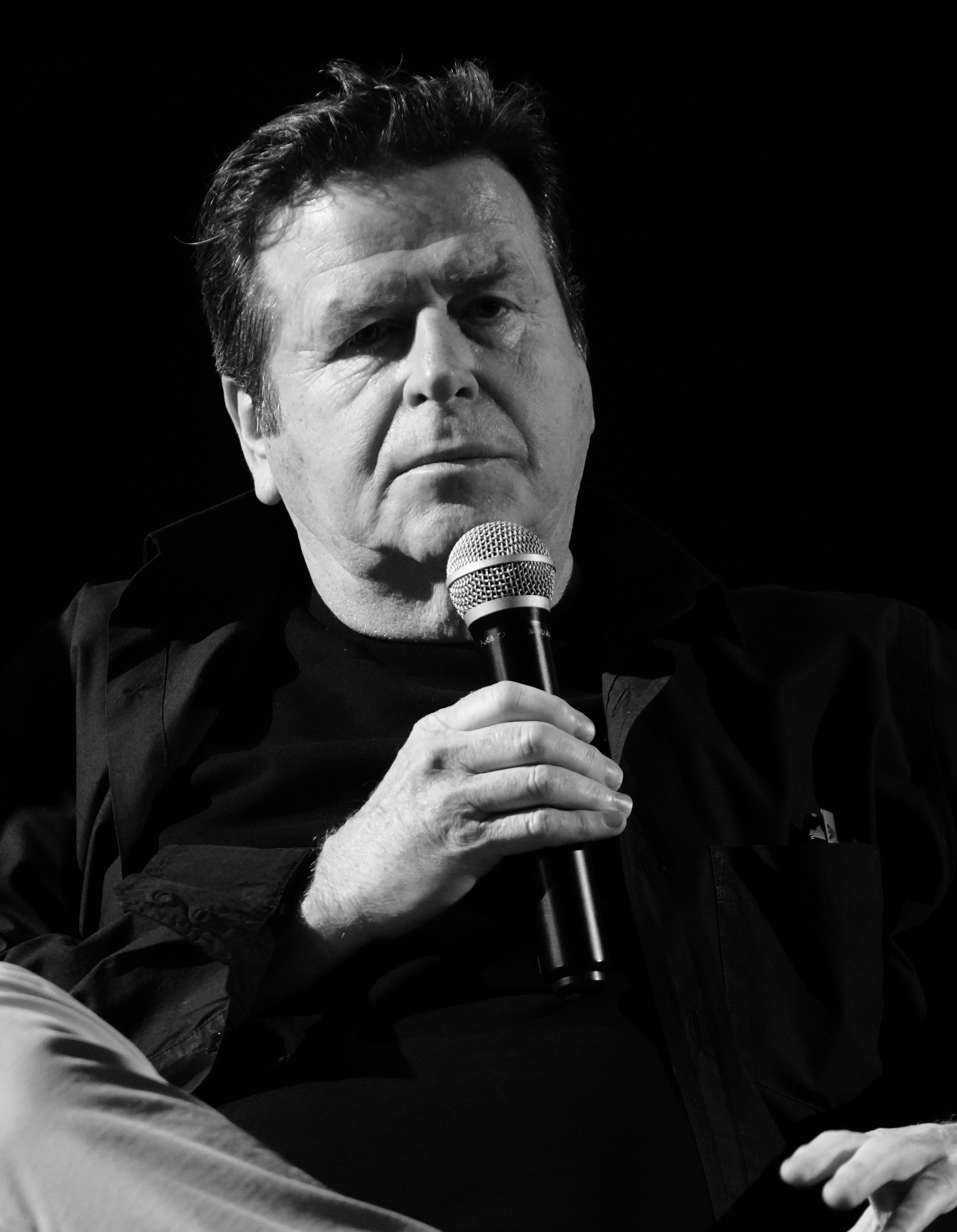
- West in 2025
- Born: Simon Alexander West; 17 July 1961 (age 65); Letchworth, Hertfordshire, England
- Occupations: Film director; film producer
- Years active: 1986–present
- Notable work: Rickroll; Con Air; Lara Croft: Tomb Raider; The Mechanic; The Expendables 2
- Spouse: Amadea West
- Children: Lillie West; Emily West; William West; Oliver West

Simon Alexander West (born 17 July 1961) is an English filmmaker. He has primarily worked in the action genre, including as the director of Con Air (1997), Lara Croft: Tomb Raider (2001), The Mechanic (2011), and The Expendables 2 (2012). Outside of action, he directed the mystery thriller film The General's Daughter (1999) and the psychological horror film When a Stranger Calls (2006).

== Early life ==
West was born in Letchworth, Hertfordshire. He began his career as an assistant film editor with the BBC Film Department, where he worked on dramas and documentaries. He then left the BBC to work on commercials and music videos. His daughter Lillie West of the band Lala Lala described the experience being a filmmaker's daughter to Paper Magazine in a 2018 interview, "My dad is a filmmaker, and he has filmed pretty much every moment of my life from when I was born."

== Career ==
=== 1990s ===
West's directorial debut in 1997 with Con Air, starring Nicolas Cage, John Cusack, and John Malkovich.

=== 2000s ===
West directed the 2001 action film, Lara Croft: Tomb Raider. Although it's an adaptation of the popular video game Tomb Raider, the development of the film was influenced by a market that "wasn't used to women leading summer blockbusters" (with the exception of the Alien film series). This factor influenced his decision to cast Angelina Jolie as Croft, though she was not well known (she was not the studio's first choice, in contrast to Catherine Zeta-Jones, Ashley Judd, and Jennifer Lopez). While Lara Croft led to box office totals that were the highest for a female-led action film at that time, ($131 million), inspired theme park rides, led to a sequel, and made a star of Jolie, West was disappointed that it did not lead to similar films. He noted that "at the time, the studio was incredibly nervous at what the outcome could have been. I'm surprised it's taken so long [for other female-fronted action stories to rise up], because I thought that two or three years after, there'd be 10 other movies like it cashing in on its success ... but it's amazing how things work so slowly. Finally The Hunger Games and Patty Jenkins' Wonder Woman have caught up!"

Joey Nolfi (Entertainment Weekly) states that West "molded his heroine – never bogged down by romantic subplots – as a badass genre role model for girls, with more scenes of assured tomb raiding and less overt sexuality" (West said to have done so "probably would've been the death of the film and the character"). Critic Cristina Lucia Stasia also argues that the film Lara Croft distinguished itself from other popular "girl power" shows and films of the same period: The Matrix (1999), Charlie's Angels (2000), Crouching Tiger, Hidden Dragon (2000), Dark Angel (2000), and Alias (2001). "Simon West, the director of Tomb Raider, foregrounds [a] tension between female sexuality and female action heroes when he argues that 'Angelina should be a role model for action actors. We turned her into something you wouldn't want to meet in a dark alley – but then again you would'."

=== 2010s–present ===
West would eventually work on a number of action films including the 2012 film The Expendables 2 with Sylvester Stallone, Jet Li, Chuck Norris, Jean-Claude Van Damme, Bruce Willis, and Arnold Schwarzenegger. He also reunited with Nicolas Cage in 2012 for Stolen. In 2015, he directed the crime thriller film Wild Card with Jason Statham. It is a remake of the 1986 film Heat, based on the novel of the same name by William Goldman. In 2017 West directed his first feature musical comedy Gun Shy starring Antonio Banderas and based on the novel Salty by Mark Haskhell Smith. West directed the 2019 big-budget disaster movie from China, Skyfire, and will also direct another Chinese action film, The Legend Hunters.

== Filmography ==
=== Films ===
Director

Year	Title	Notes
1997	Con Air	
1999	The General's Daughter	
2001	Lara Croft: Tomb Raider	Also writer
2006	When a Stranger Calls	
2011	The Mechanic	
2012	The Expendables 2	
2012	Stolen	
2015	Wild Card	
2016	Gun Shy	
2017	Stratton	
2019	Skyfire	
2024	Old Guy	
2025	The Legend Hunters	Co-directed with Li Yifan
2025	Bride Hard	
2026	Fortitude	Post-production

Executive producer

- Black Hawk Down (2002)

Producer

- Night of the Living Dead: Darkest Dawn (2015)

=== Television ===
Director

Year	Title	Notes
2003	Keen Eddie	Episodes "Pilot" and "Horse Heir"; also executive producer
2005	Close to Home	Episode "Pilot"; also executive producer
2006	Split Decision	Unsold pilot
2010	Human Target	Episode "Pilot"; also executive producer
2011	The Cape	Episode "Pilot"; also executive producer
2022	Sin límites (Boundless)	Miniseries

Executive producer

- The Saint (2017) (TV movie)

=== Music videos ===
Year	Title	Artist(s)
1986	"Showing Out (Get Fresh at the Weekend)"	Mel & Kim
1987	"Respectable"	Mel & Kim
1987	"Never Gonna Give You Up"	Rick Astley
1992	"Everybody Gets a Second Chance"	Mike and the Mechanics
