= Hannah Quinlivan =

Australian-Taiwanese actress and model

- 昆凌
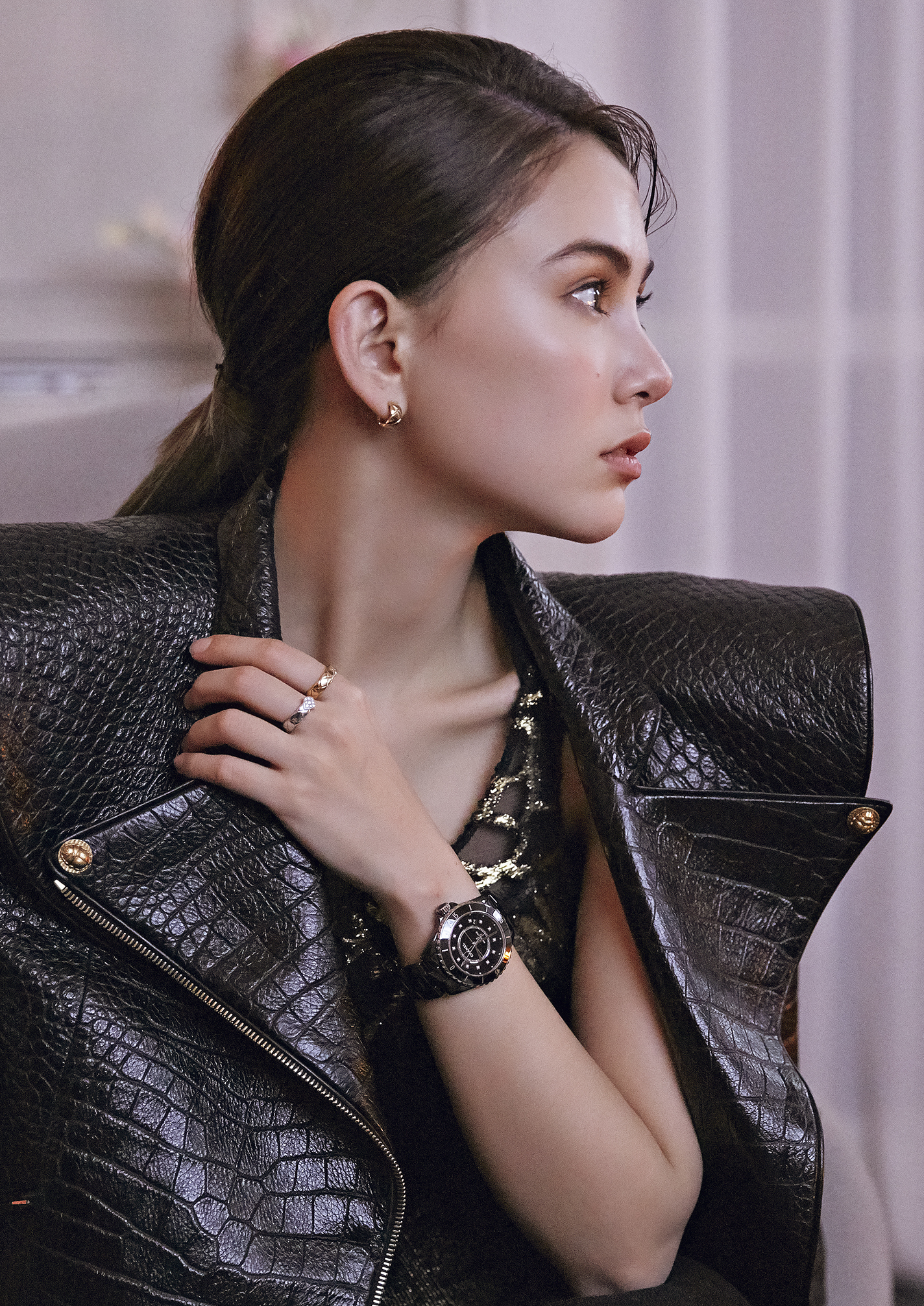
- Quinlivan in 2019
- Pronunciation: Kūn Líng
- Born: Wu Yi-Jen; 12 August 1993 (age 33); Taipei, Taiwan
- Citizenship: Australia; Taiwan
- Education: Arizona State University
- Occupations: Actress; model
- Years active: 2008–present
- Spouse: Jay Chou (m. 2015)
- Children: 3

Chinese name
- Chinese: 昆凌
Transcriptions
Standard Mandarin
- Hanyu Pinyin: Kūn Líng
- Wade–Giles: Kʻun^{1} Ling^{2}
- MPS2: Kuēn Líng

Birth name
- Traditional Chinese: 武誼蓁
- Simplified Chinese: 武谊蓁
Transcriptions
Standard Mandarin
- Hanyu Pinyin: Wǔ Yìzhēn
- Wade–Giles: Wu^{3} I^{2}-chên^{1}
- MPS2: Wǔ Yì-jēn

Hannah Quinlivan (born 12 August 1993) or Jen Wu (武誼蓁; 武谊蓁; Wǔ Yìzhēn), known professionally as Kun Ling (昆凌; Kūn Líng), is an Australian-Taiwanese actress and model.

== Life and career ==
Hannah Quinlivan was born in Taipei, Taiwan, and raised in New South Wales, Australia. Her father is European Australian, and her mother is of Chinese and Korean descent. Quinlivan began her career by appearing in Blackie's Teenage Club in 2008. She became a guest host of I Love The Man in December 2011.

She made her acting debut in Ti Amo Chocolate in 2012, playing Peng Kaili.

Quinlivan's first film role was an uncredited appearance in the film Step Back to Glory (2013). That same year, she had a minor role as Lin Jiayi in Amour et Pâtisserie.

In 2014, she appeared in Moon River, playing Lucy. She made a cameo appearance in the television series The Lying Game. She was cast in the lead role of Ren Yuhong in Heart Of Steel. She was cast in the film Twa-Tiu-Tiann, playing the former girlfriend of Chris Wang's character.

In 2017, just three days after she gave birth to her second child, Quinlivan auditioned for her role in the action thriller film Skyscraper, which was released in 2018.

She also played a role in film Skyfire (2019) as Li Xiaomeng, and acted as a top cast in the film Nezha (2021) as Lili Lu.

== Personal life ==
In November 2014, Quinlivan confirmed her relationship with singer and actor Jay Chou, who is 14 years older than her. In December 2014, Chou announced that he would marry Quinlivan on his 36th birthday.

Sarah Haywood planned their wedding in England. It took place in Selby Abbey, North Yorkshire on 17 January 2015, one day before Chou's birthday. A private wedding ceremony open to friends and family occurred on 9 February in Taipei. A third reception, this time in Australia, was held in March. According to Chou's official Facebook page, the couple has been registered for marriage since July 2014. The couple have three children: two daughters born in 2015 and 2022 respectively, and a son born in 2017.

== Filmography ==
=== Television series ===
Year	English title	Original title	Role	Notes
2012	Ti Amo Chocolate	愛上巧克力	Peng Kaili	
2013	The Patisserie with No Name	沒有名字的甜點店	Lin Jiayi	
2013	PMAM	PMAM	Herself	
2014	Moon River	明若曉溪	Lucy	
2014	The Lying Game	謊言遊戲	Passenger	
2014	Heart of Steel	鋼鐵之心	Ren Yuhong	

=== Film ===
Year	English title	Original title	Role	Notes
2013	Step Back to Glory	志氣	Zhang Ruoxi	
2014	Twa-Tiu-Tiann	大稻埕	Youxi's former girlfriend	
2017	S.M.A.R.T. Chase	極智追擊：龍鳳劫II	J. Jae Anh	
2018	Skyscraper	Skyscraper	Xia	
2019	Skyfire	天·火	Xiao Meng	
2021	Nezha	叱咤风云	Li Li LU	super speed
2023	Assassin	Assassin	Special Agent	

=== Music video ===
Year	Song title
2010	Jeric T - "Absolutely Jeric"
2011	"Jidongxianchang"
2013	"Fengmian Lianren"
2015	"Modern Maids"
