= Skyfire (film) =

2019 Chinese action film

- Directed by: Simon West
- Written by: Wei Bu; Sidney King
- Produced by: Chris Bremble; Jennifer Dong; John Hughes; Jazz Yanzhi Jiang; Charles Loi; Jib Polhemus; Aaron Shershow; Nancy Wu
- Starring: Wang Xueqi; Hannah Quinlivan; Shawn Dou; Jason Isaacs
- Cinematography: Alan Caudillo
- Music by: Pinar Toprak
- Release date: December 12, 2019
- Running time: 97 minutes
- Country: China
- Languages: Mandarin; English
- Box office: $24.8 million

Skyfire (Chinese: 天·火; pinyin: Tiānhuǒ) is a 2019 Chinese disaster action film about a volcanic eruption at a resort. It is directed by Simon West, written by Wei Bu and Sidney King, and stars Wang Xueqi, Hannah Quinlivan, Shawn Dou, and Jason Isaacs.

== Plot ==
Young Meng Li loses her mother when a volcano erupts suddenly on the Southeast Asian island of Ting-Hao. As an adult, Meng returns to the island to set up research equipment. Jack Harris has built a resort, claiming that he knows the volcano is not expected to erupt for 150 more years, and believing people like to live on the edge. Meng's father Wentao comes to the island to warn her she should leave because the volcano is about to erupt again. While she wants to stay, she and her father are soon tasked with rescuing a group of tourists observing the volcano from a platform inside the crater. Most of the tourists survive, but Meng and Wentao must save a village from the lava flow. The tourists still at the hotel end up having to leave in a hurry as flaming rocks rain down. Meng and Wentao and the rest of their group face numerous challenges getting to a control center where they can release water from a reservoir and divert the lava. Wentao then finds himself trapped on the wrong side of the lava flow and unable to escape when a helicopter arrives. Later, he joins the others on a ship, explaining that thanks to his daughter's research, he was able to hide in a hole.

== Cast ==
- Wang Xueqi as Wentao Li
- Hannah Quinlivan as Meng Li
- Shawn Dou as Zhengnan Xiao
- Jason Isaacs as Jack Harris
- Beeland Rogers as Young Meng Li

== Production ==
The film is China's first big-budget disaster film, and producer Jennifer Dong expressed hope that it would be a "breakout film" for the genre in China the way The Wandering Earth was for science fiction. While promoting the film, Simon West said Chinese audiences preferred to focus on the rescue aspect of the genre rather than the apocalyptic spectacle, leading him to view the volcano as a monster and adding animal noises to its accompanying sound effects.

The costumes for the movie were designed by Vera Chow. The helmet design for Hannah Quinlivan was provided by the Indian fashion studio The V Renaissance.

Two versions of the movie were filmed, one in Chinese and one in English, but a member of the production team said that the acting was more natural in the Chinese version and thought that the English version would not be used.

In interviews, Jason Isaacs said his portrayal of Jack Harris was influenced by Elon Musk, viewing him as a similarly "risk-taking entrepreneur", which led to Isaacs adopting a South African accent based on Musk's heritage. He also noted that the character's costuming and make-up was more "Trumpian", a parallel also noted by critics.

== Release ==
Though originally scheduled to be released in July 2019, it debuted in China on December 12, 2019, and ranked #1 at the box office on opening day.

== Reception ==
Western critics were largely dismissive of the film, criticising it for weak characters and action that was formulaic and derivative, particularly of When Time Ran Out and the imperilled theme park premise of Jurassic Park. It holds a rating of 57% on Rotten Tomatoes.

== Future ==
Skyfire was intended to be the first film in a trilogy.
