= Jane-Howard Hammerstein =

American screenwriter (1934–2022)

- Born: December 16, 1934; Greensboro, North Carolina
- Died: January 15, 2022 (aged 87); Danbury, Connecticut
- Occupation: screenwriter
- Period: 1966-1991
- Notable works: Summer of My German Soldier (1978)
- Notable awards: Humanitas Award

Jane-Howard Hammerstein (December 16, 1934 – January 15, 2022) was an American screenwriter best known as the writer of the film Summer of My German Soldier (1978), which earned a Humanitas Prize and was nominated for an Emmy Award. She also wrote the screenplay for Long Road Home (1991).

== Early life and education ==
Hammerstein was born in Greensboro, North Carolina on December 16, 1934. Her parents were William Henry Holderness and Martha Broadhurst Brooks. She was educated in Greensboro public schools and briefly attended Woman's College (now the University of North Carolina at Greensboro) but did not complete her bachelor's degree.

Hammerstein represented North Carolina at the 1958 World's Fair in Brussels.

== Career ==
Hammerstein began writing in 1961 while living in London with her first husband, Robert Carrington. Carrington and Hammerstein co-wrote several screenplays during the 1960s, including those for the films Kaleidoscope (1966) and Wait Until Dark (1967). During this time, she was credited as Jane-Howard Carrington.

In 1978, Hammerstein achieved wide recognition as the writer of the NBC television film Summer of My German Soldier, directed by Michael Tuchner and adapted from the novel of the same name by Bette Greene. Hammerstein was nominated for an Emmy Award for the film's screenplay, the first feature-length script she had written without a partner.

Hammerstein also wrote the screenplay for the 1991 film Long Road Home, a period piece about migrant farm workers during the Great Depression directed by John Korty. The story was adapted from the novel of the same name by Ronald B. Taylor. Reviews of the screenplay were more mixed than they had been for Summer of My German Soldier. However, Hammerstein's script earned a Writers Guild Award for best adapted longform screenplay.

== Private life and death ==
Hammerstein was married to fellow writer Robert Carrington during the 1960s. In 1972, she married William Hammerstein, son of lyricist Oscar Hammerstein II.

Hammerstein died in her sleep at Danbury Hospital in Danbury, Connecticut on January 15, 2022. She was 87 years old.
