= Summer of My German Soldier (film) =

1978 television film by Michael Tuchner

- VHS cover
- Genre: Drama; Romance; Historical
- Based on: Summer of My German Soldier by Bette Greene
- Screenplay by: Jane-Howard Hammerstein
- Directed by: Michael Tuchner
- Starring: Kristy McNichol; Bruce Davison; Esther Rolle; Michael Constantine
- Music by: Stanley Myers
- Country of origin: United States
- Original language: English

Production
- Producer: Linda Gottlieb
- Production locations: Crawfordville, Georgia; Madison, Georgia; Universal Studios - 100 Universal City Plaza, Universal City, California
- Cinematography: Peter Sova
- Editor: Michael Taylor
- Running time: 100 minutes
- Production company: Highgate Pictures

Original release
- Network: NBC
- Release: October 30, 1978

Summer of My German Soldier is a 1978 American television film based on the 1973 novel of the same title written by Bette Greene. Set during World War II, it stars Kristy McNichol as a Jewish-American girl and Bruce Davison as the German prisoner of war whom she befriends.

== Plot ==
Thirteen-year-old Patty Bergen lives in the small American town of Jenkinsville, Georgia, during World War II. Patty's Jewish-American family owns the local clothing and general supplies store, in which Patty occasionally works. Her abusive father and uncaring mother have little time for her, instead favoring her younger sister Sharon; however, Patty does have a friend in Ruth, the family's black, middle-aged housekeeper.

The U.S. government opens a prisoner-of-war (POW) camp for captured German soldiers in the town. One day, when the POWs are brought into the Bergen's store to buy supplies, Patty meets Anton, one of the few prisoners able to speak English. Soon after, Anton escapes from the camp and goes on the run. He is about to board a train when Patty sees him and spoils his plan. Rather than inform the authorities, Patty hides Anton in some abandoned rooms above the family's disused garage and brings him food. Anton shows Patty a warmth and respect that she never had from her cold family and the two become close friends.

Anton is almost exposed when he sees Patty's father beating her one day and runs out of hiding to protect her, but she shouts for him to go back before he is seen. However, Ruth sees Anton. She does not approve of Patty harboring him, but agrees to keep her secret and helps by giving Anton food. Before long, the FBI begins conducting a thorough search of the town looking for Anton. When they call at the Bergens' home, Patty runs out to the garage to warn Anton that he must leave immediately or he will be caught. Anton flees from the garage after thanking Patty for her help and gives her a valuable ring that belonged to his grandfather. However, while trying to leave the town that night, the FBI finds Anton and they shoot him dead while he is trying to escape. The FBI return to the Bergens' house that night and relay the news of Anton's death to Patty, who is utterly devastated.

Appalled to hear that his own daughter aided a Nazi prisoner, her father virtually disowns her and tells her that she is dead to him. She also feels alienated by the townsfolk who view her as a traitor. The only person who still talks to her is Ruth, who has now been fired from her job as housekeeper for helping Patty. Ruth tries to comfort Patty in her grief and tells the townsfolk to leave Patty alone as only God has the right to stand in judgment of her.

== Cast ==
- Kristy McNichol as Patty Bergen
- Bruce Davison as Anton Reiker
- Esther Rolle as Ruth
- Michael Constantine as Harry Bergen
- Barbara Barrie as Pearl Bergen
- James Noble as John Pierce
- Robyn Lively as Sharon Bergen
- Margaret Hall as Sister Parker
- Anne Haney as Mrs. Benn
- Sonny Shroyer as Ed McFee
- Jane Hickey as Edna Louise
- Mary Nell Santacroce as Gussie Mae
- Roy Morris as Freddy
- William Ovell as Mayor Holderness
- J. Don Ferguson as Mr. Jackson

== Differences from the novel ==
Although the TV movie is generally faithful to the source novel, some minor changes were made. The town of Jenkinsville is now situated in Georgia rather than Arkansas. Also, whereas in the novel Patty stands trial for treason and is convicted and sentenced to reform school, in the movie she is simply classed as a juvenile delinquent and remains in the custody of her parents until she is 18. The novel also mentions Patty's plans to visit Anton's mother in Germany after the war is over, but this is not mentioned in the film. Lastly, while Patty is depicted as 12 years old in the novel, her age is not mentioned in the film; press releases for the movie stated she was 13 (and actress Kristy McNichol was 15 when she made the film, suggesting Patty was in her teens).

== Awards and nominations ==
| Year | Award | Category | Nominee(s) | Result | Ref. |
|---|---|---|---|---|---|
| 1979 | Humanitas Prize | 90 Minute or Longer Network or Syndicated Television | Jane Howard-Hammerstein | Won | |
| 1979 | Primetime Emmy Awards | Outstanding Drama or Comedy Special | Linda Gottlieb | Nominated | |
| 1979 | Primetime Emmy Awards | Outstanding Supporting Actress in a Limited Series or a Special | Esther Rolle | Won | |
| 1979 | Primetime Emmy Awards | Outstanding Writing in a Limited Series or a Special | Jane Howard-Hammerstein | Nominated | |
