= List of awards and nominations received by Warren Beatty =

Warren Beatty awards and nominations
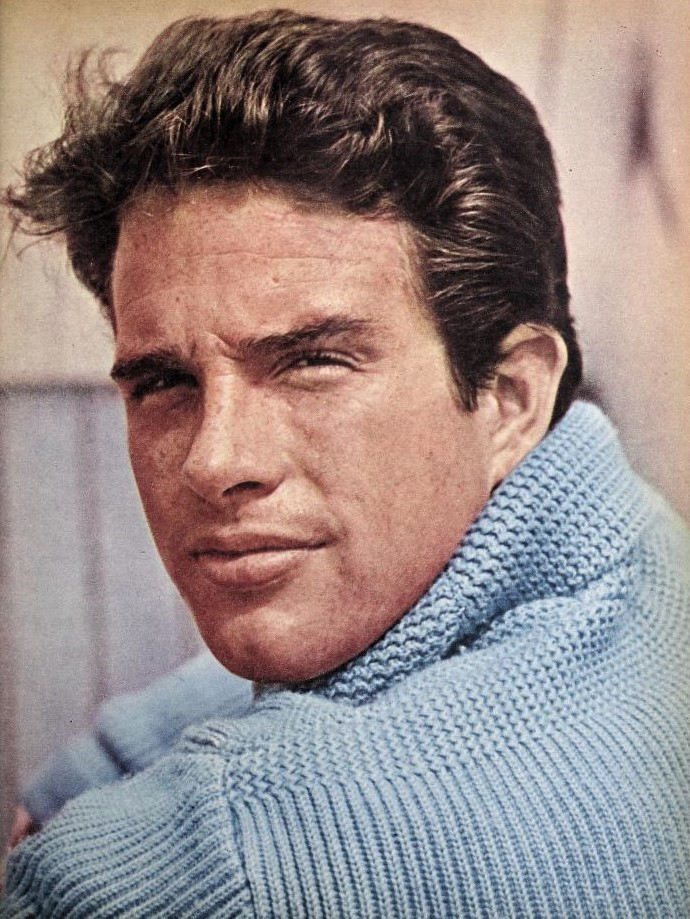
Awards and nominations
| Award | Wins | Nominations |
| Academy Awards | 1 | 14 |
| BAFTA Awards | 0 | 2 |
| Golden Globe Awards | 3 | 11 |
| Tony Awards | 0 | 1 |

Totals (Note: Certain award groups do not simply award one winner. They acknowledge several different recipients, have runners-up, and have third place. Since this is a specific recognition and is different from losing an award, runner-up mentions are considered wins in this award tally. For simplification and to avoid errors, each award in this list has been presumed to have had a prior nomination.)
- Wins: 11
- Nominations: 36

Warren Beatty is an American filmmaker and actor. Over his career he has received an Academy Award, and three Golden Globe Awards as well as nominations for two BAFTA Awards and a Tony Award. He was honored with the Irving G. Thalberg Award in 1999, the BAFTA Fellowship in 2002, the Kennedy Center Honors in 2004, the Cecil B. DeMille Award in 2007, and the AFI Life Achievement Award in 2008.

Beatty has been nominated for 14 Academy Awards, including four for Best Actor, four for Best Picture, two for Best Director, three for Original Screenplay, and one for Adapted Screenplay – winning Best Director for Reds (1981). Beatty is the only person to have been nominated for acting, directing, writing, and producing in the same film, and he did so twice: first for Heaven Can Wait (with Buck Henry as co-director) and again for Reds. (Note: Orson Welles was nominated for acting in, directing, and writing Citizen Kane. Although the film was also nominated for Best Picture and Welles was its producer, that award was not given to individual producers until 1951.) He was nominated for his performances as Clyde Barrow in the crime drama Bonnie and Clyde (1967), a quarterback mistakenly taken to heaven in the sports fantasy drama Heaven Can Wait (1978), John Reed in the historical epic Reds (1981), and Bugsy Siegel in the crime drama Bugsy (1991), the later three of which he also directed.

He won three competitive Golden Globe Awards, his first for New Star of the Year – Actor for Splendor in the Grass (1961). He also won for Best Actor in a Motion Picture – Musical or Comedy for Heaven Can Wait (1978) and Best Director for Reds (1981). He won the Directors Guild of America Award for Outstanding Directing – Feature Film for the later. He also won three Writers Guild of America Awards: Best Adapted Screenplay for Heaven Can Wait (1978), and two wins for Best Original Screenplay for Reds (1981), and Bulworth (1998).

On stage, Beatty made his Broadway debut in the William Inge kitchen sink drama A Loss of Roses (1960) for which he was nominated for the Tony Award for Best Featured Actor in a Play.

== Major associations ==
=== Academy Award ===
| Year | Category | Nominated work | Result | Ref. |
|---|---|---|---|---|
| 1968 | Best Picture | Bonnie and Clyde | Nominated | |
| 1968 | Best Actor | Bonnie and Clyde | Nominated | |
| 1976 | Best Original Screenplay | Shampoo | Nominated | |
| 1979 | Best Picture | Heaven Can Wait | Nominated | |
| 1979 | Best Director | Heaven Can Wait | Nominated | |
| 1979 | Best Actor | Heaven Can Wait | Nominated | |
| 1979 | Best Adapted Screenplay | Heaven Can Wait | Nominated | |
| 1982 | Best Picture | Reds | Nominated | |
| 1982 | Best Director | Reds | Won | |
| 1982 | Best Actor | Reds | Nominated | |
| 1982 | Best Original Screenplay | Reds | Nominated | |
| 1992 | Best Picture | Bugsy | Nominated | |
| 1992 | Best Actor | Bugsy | Nominated | |
| 1999 | Best Original Screenplay | Bulworth | Nominated | |
| 2000 | Irving G. Thalberg Memorial Award | | Honored | |

=== BAFTA Awards ===
| Year | Category | Nominated work | Result | Ref. |
British Academy Film Awards
| 1968 | Best Foreign Actor | Bonnie and Clyde | Nominated | |
| 1983 | Best Actor | Reds | Nominated | |
| 2001 | BAFTA Fellowship | | Received | |

=== Golden Globe Awards ===
| Year | Category | Nominated work | Result | Ref. |
|---|---|---|---|---|
| 1962 | Most Promising Newcomer - Male | Splendor in the Grass | Won | |
| 1962 | Best Actor - Motion Picture Drama | Splendor in the Grass | Nominated | |
| 1968 | Best Actor - Motion Picture Drama | Bonnie and Clyde | Nominated | |
| 1976 | Best Actor - Motion Picture Musical or Comedy | Shampoo | Nominated | |
| 1979 | Best Actor - Motion Picture Musical or Comedy | Heaven Can Wait | Won | |
| 1982 | Best Director | Reds | Won | |
| 1982 | Best Actor - Motion Picture Drama | Reds | Nominated | |
| 1982 | Best Screenplay | Reds | Nominated | |
| 1992 | Best Actor - Motion Picture Drama | Bugsy | Nominated | |
| 1999 | Best Actor - Motion Picture Musical or Comedy | Bulworth | Nominated | |
| 1999 | Best Screenplay | Bulworth | Nominated | |
| 2007 | Cecil B. DeMille Award | | Honored | |

=== Tony Awards ===
| Year | Category | Nominated work | Result | Ref. |
|---|---|---|---|---|
| 1960 | Best Featured Actor in a Play | A Loss of Roses | Nominated | |

== Miscellaneous awards ==
=== Directors Guild Awards ===
| Year | Category | Nominated work | Result | Ref. |
|---|---|---|---|---|
| 1979 | Outstanding Director - Feature Film | Heaven Can Wait | Nominated | |
| 1982 | Outstanding Director - Feature Film | Reds | Won | |

=== Writers Guild Awards ===
| Year | Category | Nominated work | Result | Ref. |
|---|---|---|---|---|
| 1976 | Best Original Screenplay | Shampoo | Nominated | |
| 1979 | Best Adapted Screenplay | Heaven Can Wait | Won | |
| 1982 | Best Original Screenplay | Reds | Won | |
| 1999 | Best Original Screenplay | Bulworth | Nominated | |

== Honorary awards ==
| Organization | Year | Honor | Ref. |
|---|---|---|---|
| French Minister of Culture | 1992 | Ordre des Arts et des Lettres | |
| National Board of Review | 1998 | Alan J. Pakula Memorial Award | |
| Americans for Democratic Action | 1999 | Eleanor Roosevelt Award | |
| American Society of Cinematographers | 1999 | Board of Governors Award | |
| Brennan Center for Justice | 2001 | Brennan Legacy Award | |
| Costume Designers Guild | 2001 | Distinguished Director Award | |
| San Sebastián International Film Festival | 2001 | Donostia Lifetime Achievement Award | |
| British Academy of Film and Television Arts | 2002 | BAFTA Fellowship | |
| Publicists Guild Award | 2002 | Life Achievement Award | |
| San Francisco International Film Festival | 2002 | Akira Kurosawa Lifetime Achievement Award | |
| Kennedy Center for Performing Arts | 2004 | Kennedy Center Honors | |
| Producers Guild of America | 2004 | Milestone Award | |
| Foundation for Taxpayer and Consumer Rights | 2005 | Phillip Burton Public Service Award | |
| American Film Institute | 2008 | AFI Life Achievement Award | |
| Venice Film Festival | 2008 | Career Golden Lion | |
| Art Directors Guild | 2009 | Outstanding Contribution to Cinematic Imagery Award | |
| Britannia Awards | 2011 | Stanley Kubrick Award | |
| California Hall of Fame | 2013 | Inductee | |
| Museum of the Moving Image | 2016 | Honoree | |
| Santa Barbara International Film Festival | 2016 | Kirk Douglas Award for Excellence | |

== Directed Academy Award Performances ==
| Year | Performer | Film | Result |
|---|---|---|---|
Academy Award for Best Actor
| 1979 | Himself | Heaven Can Wait | Nominated |
| 1982 | Himself | Reds | Nominated |
Academy Award for Best Supporting Actor
| 1979 | Jack Warden | Heaven Can Wait | Nominated |
| 1982 | Jack Nicholson | Reds | Nominated |
| 1991 | Al Pacino | Dick Tracy | Nominated |
Academy Award for Best Actress
| 1982 | Diane Keaton | Reds | Nominated |
Academy Award for Best Supporting Actress
| 1979 | Dyan Cannon | Heaven Can Wait | Nominated |
| 1982 | Maureen Stapleton | Reds | Won |
