= Kaleidoscope (1966 film) =

1966 film directed by Jack Smight

- Original film poster by Bob Peak
- Directed by: Jack Smight
- Written by: Robert Carrington; Jane-Howard Hammerstein
- Produced by: Elliott Kastner; Jerry Gershwin
- Starring: Warren Beatty; Susannah York; Clive Revill
- Cinematography: Christopher Challis
- Edited by: John Jympson
- Music by: Stanley Myers
- Production company: Winkast Film Productions
- Distributed by: Warner-Pathé Distributors (UK); Warner Bros. Pictures (US)
- Release dates: July 1966 (UK); 22 September 1966 (US)
- Running time: 103 minutes
- Country: United Kingdom; United States
- Language: English
- Budget: £482,109

Kaleidoscope (also known as The Bank Breaker) is a 1966 comedy caper film directed by Jack Smight and starring Warren Beatty, Susannah York and Clive Revill. The film follows a jet-setting gambler (Beatty) and his lover (York), who are blackmailed by a Scotland Yard Inspector (Revill) into using their skills to takedown a crime boss.

The film was produced independently by Elliott Kastner and Jerry Gershwin and distributed by Warner Bros. Pictures. It received generally positive reviews from critics.

== Plot ==
After leaving his lover Angel McGinnis behind in London, rich playboy Barney Lincoln breaks into a playing card manufacturer in Geneva to mark the cards, and then proceeds to break the bank at major European casinos.

Barney meets up with Angel again in Monte Carlo, where he wins a great deal of money, but her suspicions after he left England caused her to consult her father, a Scotland Yard Inspector. He blackmails Barney into helping him catch a powerful drug smuggler named Harry Dominion, who owns a casino and also has a weakness for high stakes poker.

== Cast ==
- Warren Beatty as Barney Lincoln
- Susannah York as Angel McGinnis
- Clive Revill as Inspector 'Manny' McGinnis
- Eric Porter as Harry Dominion
- Murray Melvin as Aimes
- George Sewell as Billy
- Stanley Meadows as Jack
- John Junkin as Dominion's porter
- Larry Taylor as Dominion's chauffeur
- Yootha Joyce as museum receptionist
- Jane Birkin as "Exquisite Thing"
- George Murcell as Johnny
- Anthony Newlands as Leeds
- Jose Sukhum Boonlve as poker dealer
- Peter Blythe, John Bennett, Michael Balfour, Joan Benham as poker players

== Production ==
Kaleidoscope was the third film Jack Smight directed for Warners. Smight called the script "terrific... a little hard to believe, but nevertheless a jolly fun premise laced with great humor."

He says producer Elliot Kastner cast Sandra Dee as the female lead mostly because Warren Beatty wanted to sleep with her. Smight said, "Though I had worked with Sandra in my first film...and had regard for her, I couldn’t conceive of her playing a role of the British girl that the script called for...So much for the producer’s wanting to protect the integrity of a fine screenplay."

During pre-production in France, Kastner admitted he did not want Dee in the film. Smight asked Jack Warner if he could have Susannah York and Warner agreed. Dee was paid off.

Filming took place on-location in London, Surrey, Paris (doubling for Geneva), Monte Carlo, and at Pinewood Studios.

Smight says Beatty was undisciplined during filming. They would rehearse scenes but then "just as we were about to roll the camera, Warren would ask if he could try something different from what we had earlier settled upon. I wanted to be flexible in the event that what he wanted to do was better than what we had planned. Inevitably it wasn't."

== Soundtrack ==
The soundtrack to the film was released on Warner Bros. WS-1633. It was given a short but warm review by Cash Box in the October 22, 1966 issue with the magazine picking the tracks "Angel's Theme" and "Dominion's Deal" as the better efforts.

One night Stanley Myers and Barry Fantoni were at the Chi Chi club discussing the need for a song to match the intense switched on vibe of the movie. The club's resident group Romeo Z came on stage and caused the ceiling to shake. In six or seven seconds they knew they had what they wanted and some time later the group was at the recording session.

== Release ==
The film had its world premiere on 8 September 1966 at the Warner Theatre in the West End of London.

== Reception ==
=== Critical response ===
The Monthly Film Bulletin wrote: "'Warning enough of what is to come, one would think, in the way Kaleidoscope is advertised. A "groovie movie" it certainly is, with a battery of fashionable camera tricks, multicoloured, kaleidoscopic dissolves, and virtually every scene introduced from behind an irrelevant piece of furniture in the set. But the refreshing novelty about Jack Smight's film is that though these modish camera patterns are part and parcel of the exercise, there is at least a wood behind the trees, and the film is kept alive by its own momentum. ... The restless, zooming camera is occasionally irritating, some of the cuts ...are mechanically self-conscious, and the colour is disappointingly dull. But the gambling scenes are as hypnotic as ever, and the film is kept on the move, and not least because of an excellent cast, with Clive Revill particularly good as the sly detective. Ironically, Kaleidoscope works best when it looks old fashioned; and if it has its stock of breezy fashions, it also has a pace to keep them well under control."

In The Radio Times Guide to Films Tom Hutchinson retrospectively gave the film 3/5 stars, writing: "This 1960s caper is so swinging it almost comes off its hinges. Warren Beatty, not renowned at the time for his monkish lifestyle, is strangely unconvincing as the cardsharp who literally marks winning cards, while hip chick Susannah York keeps his libido on the boil. The movie defies its dated trendiness with the sheer esprit of the performances."
