= Philip Hall Likes Me, I Reckon Maybe =

1974 novel by Bette Greene

- First edition
- Author: Bette Greene
- Language: English
- Genre: Young adult fiction
- Publisher: The Dial Press
- Publication date: 1974
- Publication place: United States
- Media type: Print
- Awards: Newbery Honor (1975)
- Followed by: Get On Out of Here, Philip Hall

Philip Hall Likes Me, I Reckon Maybe is a children's novel written by Bette Greene that was awarded a Newbery Honor in 1975. The book was published in 1974 by The Dial Press. It is the first of three novels to feature protagonist Beth Lambert and her friend Philip Hall.

== Plot ==
The book is set in rural Arkansas in the late 20th century. Eleven-year-old Beth Lambert is second-best at almost everything in school, from math to sports. She doesn't mind, though, because she's second only to Philip Hall. Over the course of the novel, she begins to grapple with the idea that perhaps she's letting Philip beat her so he'll remain her friend.
