= Wait Until Dark (film) =

1967 film by Terence Young

- Theatrical release poster
- Directed by: Terence Young
- Screenplay by: Robert Carrington; Jane-Howard Carrington
- Based on: Wait Until Dark (1966 play) by Frederick Knott
- Produced by: Mel Ferrer
- Starring: Audrey Hepburn; Alan Arkin; Richard Crenna; Jack Weston; Efrem Zimbalist Jr.
- Cinematography: Charles Lang
- Edited by: Gene Milford
- Music by: Henry Mancini
- Production company: Warner Bros. Pictures
- Distributed by: Warner Bros.-Seven Arts
- Release date: October 26, 1967
- Running time: 108 minutes
- Country: United States
- Language: English
- Budget: $3 million
- Box office: $17.5 million

Wait Until Dark is a 1967 American psychological thriller film directed by Terence Young, adapted by Robert and Jane-Howard Carrington from Frederick Knott's 1966 play. It stars Audrey Hepburn, Alan Arkin, Richard Crenna, Jack Weston and Efrem Zimbalist Jr.. The film is about a blind woman (Hepburn) who is terrorized in her apartment by a trio of thugs searching for a lost drug shipment. Produced by Mel Ferrer, Hepburn's then-husband, Wait Until Dark was released by Warner Bros.-Seven Arts on October 26, 1967.

Hepburn earned nominations for the Academy Award for Best Actress and the Golden Globe Award for Best Actress in a Motion Picture – Drama for her performance, while Zimbalist was nominated for the Golden Globe Award for Best Supporting Actor – Motion Picture. The film is ranked number 55 on the American Film Institute's 2001 "100 Years...100 Thrills" list, and its climax is ranked tenth on Bravo's 100 Scariest Movie Moments. Wait Until Dark also marked Audrey Hepburn's final film before her semi-retirement in 1968.

== Plot ==
Attractive drug mule Lisa flies from Montreal to New York City, smuggling heroin inside a stuffed doll. Disembarking, she spots a threatening man; using a ruse, she gives the doll to a fellow passenger, professional photographer Sam Hendrix, for temporary safekeeping. She is roughly escorted off by the scowling man.

Con artists Mike Talman and Carlino arrive at a Greenwich Village basement apartment they believe to be Lisa's, but instead is the Hendrixes'. The criminals are eventually confronted by the man from the airport, calling himself "Harry Roat Jr." Saying Lisa double-crossed him, he offers to pay them to find the doll. Having served jail time for a previous scam involving Lisa, Talman and Carlino are cautious. Curious about a locked closet in the apartment, they ask Roat to hand over the key and find Lisa's corpse. Roat blackmails them into an alliance, pointing out that their fingerprints are now all over the apartment, and they're Lisa's known associates. Suddenly, Sam's wife, Susy, arrives, and the men hide and realize she is blind. Once Susy leaves, they dispose of the body. The three collaborate on a plan to persuade Susy to locate the doll for them. Sam had received a call from Lisa but had been unable to find the doll.

The next day, Susy learns the police have found a woman's body nearby. Posing as an agent for a model, "Lejiana", Roat phones Sam for a photography assignment, sending him on a wild goose chase to Asbury Park. Talman arrives posing as an old Marine friend of Sam's. Once he leaves, Roat, disguised as an old man, barges in and alarms Susy by asking for Sam. Talman returns and pretends to phone the police, and Carlino arrives impersonating a detective and pointedly asking about Sam's whereabouts the night before. Roat returns, posing as the old man's son, explaining that his father broke in to find proof Sam was involved with Lejiana, who hasn't been seen since last night. He describes the doll and suggests that Lejiana may have left it at the apartment. Susy concludes the murdered woman was the fictional Lejiana Roat. With Talman's coaxing she becomes desperate to find the doll to eliminate any connection between the innocent Sam and the killing.

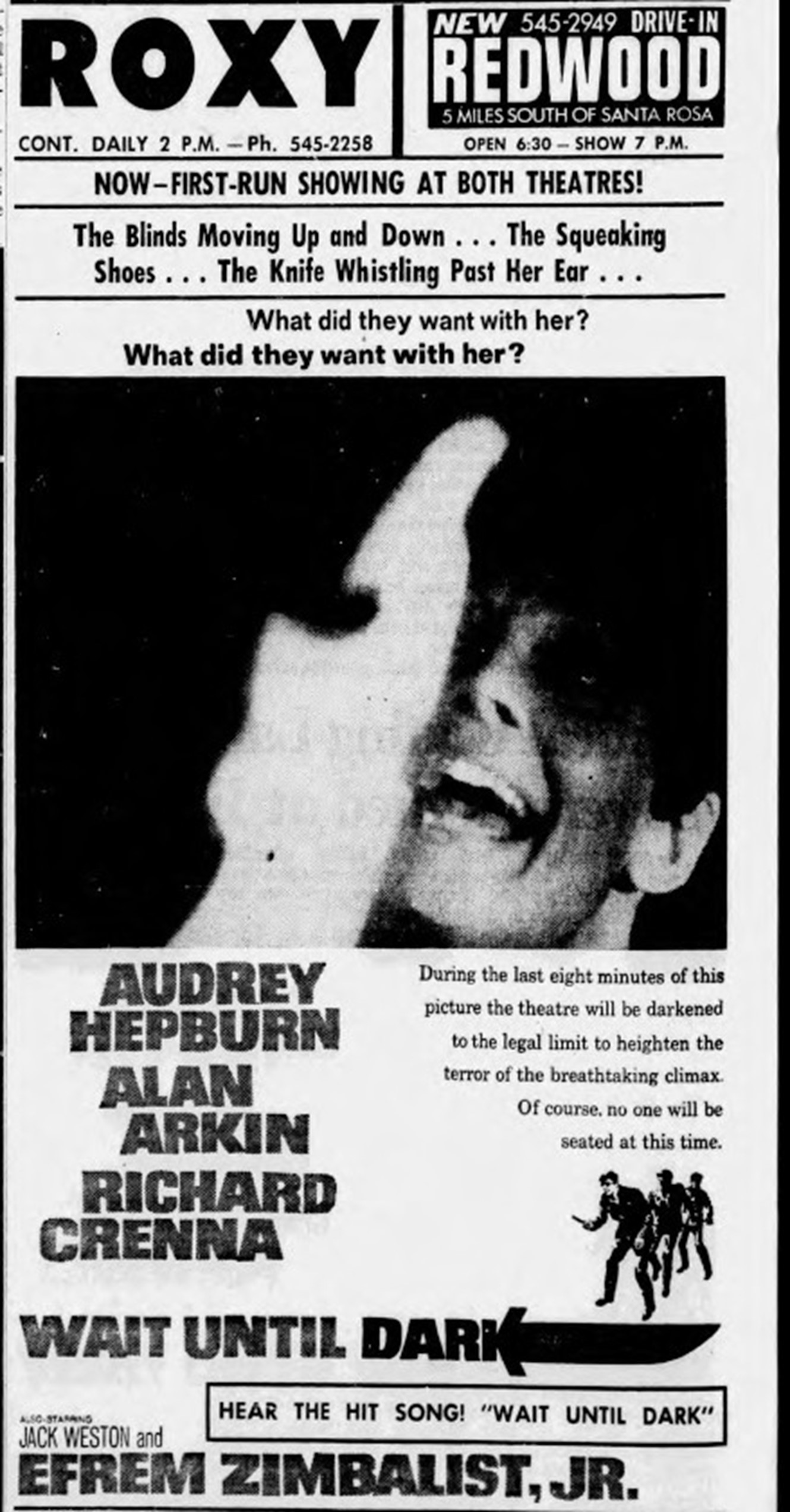
Advertisement from 1967

Oblivious, Gloria, a young neighbor girl who helps Susy with errands, sneaks in to return the doll she had borrowed without permission. Enlisting her help, Susy realizes that Talman's claim that a police car is watching the building is false; a van is outside with a man lingering near a phone booth. All the phone calls Susy has received are being made from there. Terrified, Susy realizes the men are all criminals and hides the doll. Diverting them to Sam's studio, Susy furtively sends Gloria off to intercept Sam on his way back home. She dials the police only to learn the phone line has been cut. To provide the cover of darkness, Susy shatters every lightbulb in the apartment except the darkroom safelight. She fills a flower pot with hypo fixer as a potential weapon.

Talman returns, realizes she's figured out the con, and demands the doll. Susy refuses. Telling her that he has sent Carlino to kill Roat and is cutting his losses, Talman is leaving when he is stabbed to death by Roat, who anticipated their betrayal and killed Carlino. Roat locks and chains the exit door, spreads gasoline around the apartment and threatens to set the place alight. Throwing hypo fixer in his face, Susy unplugs the safelight, plunging the apartment into total darkness. Roat lights matches to see, but Susy counters by dousing him with gas. Roat manages to open the refrigerator, its light providing illumination. Hearing the refrigerator's motor, Susy recognizes she's been beaten and hands over the doll. While Roat slices it open and pockets the heroin, ordering Suzy to the bedroom, she stabs him with a kitchen knife. She hides in a corner behind the open refrigerator door. As Roat crawls to stab her, she yanks the refrigerator's plug, restoring total darkness.

Arriving with police, Sam finds Susy, unharmed, still cowering behind the refrigerator door. Roat lies dead beneath a toppled shelf.

== Cast ==
- Audrey Hepburn as Susy Hendrix
- Alan Arkin as Roat / Harry Roat Jr. / Harry Roat Sr.
- Richard Crenna as Mike Talman
- Efrem Zimbalist Jr. as Sam Hendrix
- Jack Weston as Carlino
- Samantha Jones as Lisa
- Julie Herrod as Gloria
- Frank O'Brien as Shatner
- Jean Del Val as Louis
- Gary Morgan as Boy on Street
- Robby Benson as Boy at Airport

== Production ==
=== Filming ===
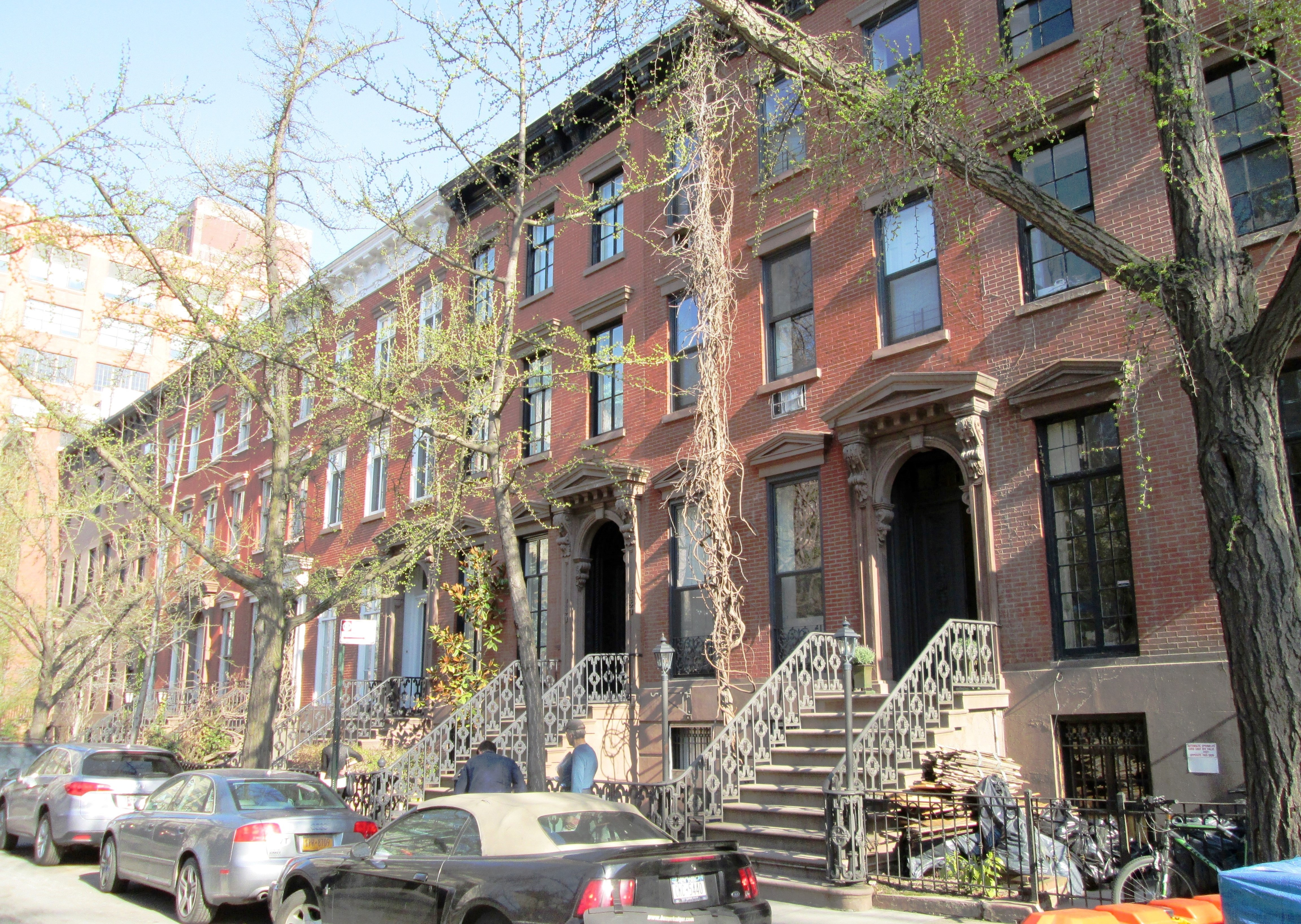
4 St. Luke's Place in Greenwich Village, Manhattan, was used as the exterior of Susy Hendrix's apartment building.

Principal photography occurred from January 15 to April 7, 1967, in New York City, Montreal, and at the Warner Bros. Studios in Burbank, California. The exterior of Susy Hendrix (Audrey Hepburn)'s apartment building was filmed at 4 St. Luke's Place in Greenwich Village, Manhattan. Hepburn was 37 during production and her wardrobe was notably not designed by Givenchy. In an interview with Barbara Walters in 1989, when asking Hepburn the reason why she decided to step away from acting after Wait Until Dark, Hepburn replied, "Very simple reason, because my son had then reached the age of six. Sean had to go to school, could no longer travel with me, and in fact I made Wait Until Dark when he had just started school and he was not with me, 'cause that picture's made in Hollywood. And I was just miserable. You know, I'd call home and he'd have a fever or something and he was so far away, and I missed him terribly. And I [had] longed for this child. It seemed so ridiculous . I kept saying to myself, 'yeah, I wanted this child so badly and now I'm separated from him,' and it just made me too unhappy so I more or less quit movies then to stay home [with him]." Walters also notes that despite the film going on to become a "huge hit, surprisingly it marked the end of her full time acting career. Audrey virtually disappeared, and became somewhat of a mystery."

== Release ==
To immerse viewers in the suspense of the climactic scene, movie theater owners were encouraged to dim their lights, then turn them off, one by one to the legal limit.

== Reception ==
=== Box office ===
The film was one of the more popular of its year, earning North American rentals of $7.35 million (equivalent to $71 million in 2025). In Spain, translated as Sola en la oscuridad (Alone in the Dark), it was released in March 1968 and sold 1.9 million tickets. It was re-released in August 1980 with 203,036 tickets sold.

=== Critical response ===
Bosley Crowther called it a "barefaced melodrama, without character revelation of any sort, outside of the demonstration of a person with the fortitude to overcome an infirmity;" he liked Hepburn's performance, saying "the sweetness with which Miss Hepburn plays the poignant role, the quickness with which she changes and the skill with which she manifests terror attract sympathy and anxiety to her and give her genuine solidity in the final scenes."

Time magazine said the film had a "better scenario, set and cast" than the play's Broadway production that preceded it, and while "the story is as full of holes as a kitchen colander," "Hepburn's honest, posture-free performance helps to suspend the audience's disbelief" and she is "immensely aided by the heavies: Jack Weston, Richard Crenna, and Alan Arkin....With virtuosity, Hepburn and Arkin collaborate to revive an old theme—The-Helpless-Girl-Against-the-Odds—that has been out of fashion since Dorothy McGuire and Barbara Stanwyck screamed for help in The Spiral Staircase and Sorry, Wrong Number."

Roger Ebert gave the movie three and a half stars upon release, writing "Miss Hepburn is perhaps too simple and trusting, and Alan Arkin (as a sadistic killer) is not particularly convincing in an exaggerated performance. But there are some nice, juicy passages of terror (including that famous moment when every adolescent girl in the theater screams), and after a slow start the plot does seduce you."

On the review aggregator website Rotten Tomatoes, the film holds an approval rating of 96% based on 25 reviews, with an average rating of 8.1/10. The website's critics consensus reads, "Nail-bitingly tense and brilliantly acted, Wait Until Dark is a compact thriller that makes the most of its fiendishly clever premise." Metacritic, which uses a weighted average, assigned the film a score of 81 out of 100, based on 9 critics, indicating "universal acclaim". The film was ranked tenth on Bravo's 100 Scariest Movie Moments for its riveting climax.

Despite the film's acclaim and receiving an Oscar nomination, Hepburn stepped away from film acting after Wait Until Dark's release and would not appear on film again until Robin and Marian in 1976.

=== Accolades ===
Award	Category	Recipient	Result	Ref.
Academy Awards	Best Actress	Audrey Hepburn	Nominated	
Golden Globe Awards	Best Actress in a Motion Picture – Drama	Audrey Hepburn	Nominated	
Golden Globe Awards	Best Supporting Actor – Motion Picture	Efrem Zimbalist Jr.	Nominated	
Laurel Awards	Top Drama	Wait Until Dark	5th Place	
Laurel Awards	Top Female Dramatic Performance	Audrey Hepburn	3rd Place	

American Film Institute recognition:

- 2001 – AFI's 100 Years...100 Thrills – No. 55

== Soundtrack ==
The score for the film was composed by Henry Mancini, who had scored other Audrey Hepburn films such as Breakfast at Tiffany's and Two for the Road. The Wait Until Dark score is notable for Mancini's use of two pianos, tuned a quarter-tone apart, with the out of tune instrument's notes providing discordance that heightens the eerie effect.

2007 Film Score Monthly Album
No.	Title	Length
1.	"Come On Louie/The Doll"	1:49
2.	"Main Title"	4:11
3.	"Don't Make Waves/Big Drag for Lisa"	3:26
4.	"Light Relief"	1:09
5.	"Radio Source/He's Got Time"	3:04
6.	"World's Champion Blind Lady"	1:24
7.	"Phono Source I"	3:02
8.	"Phono Source II"	1:43
9.	"Pick Up Sticks"	2:24
10.	"The Doll Again"	3:19
11.	"Watch the Booth/It's for You"	1:25
12.	"Chair Kicker"	4:42
13.	"Bulbus Terror"	3:53
14.	"Gassy!/Strum Along/The Doll"	3:37
15.	"Cutting Roat a New One"	1:50
16.	"You're Doing Fine"	1:15
17.	"Wait Until Dark"	2:15
18.	"Bonus Track: Alternate Main Title"	2:06
19.	"Bonus Track: He's Got Time (alternate)"	0:39
20.	"Bonus Track: Piano Tests"	2:30

== See also ==
- List of American films of 1967
- List of films featuring home invasions
- 27 Mavalli Circle
