= Warren Beatty =

American actor and filmmaker (born 1937)

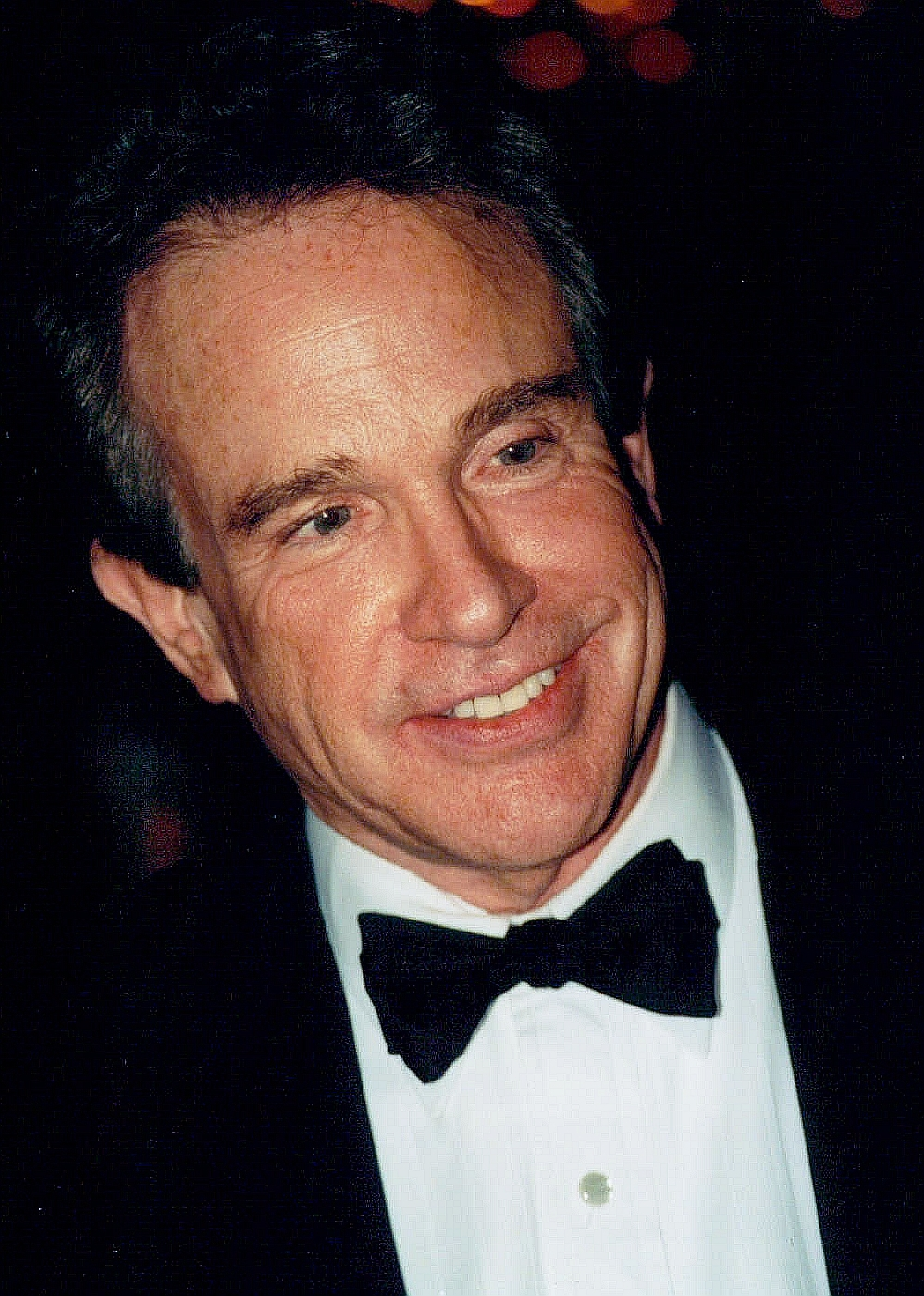
- Beatty in 2001
- Born: Henry Warren Beaty; March 30, 1937 (age 89); Richmond, Virginia, U.S.
- Occupations: Actor; filmmaker
- Years active: 1956–present
- Known for: Full list
- Spouse: Annette Bening (m. 1992)
- Children: 4, including Ella
- Relatives: Shirley MacLaine (sister); Sachi Parker (niece)
- Awards: Full list

Signature
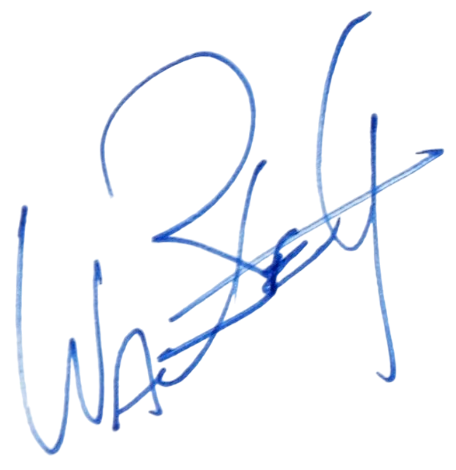

Henry Warren Beatty (Note: Beatty changed the original spelling Beaty, pronounced /ˈbeɪti/ BAY-tee, in 1957. Both Warren Beatty and his sister, Shirley MacLaine, have said they consider only this pronunciation correct, and Warren was fond of saying the name should rhyme with "weighty", not "Wheaties". But the pronunciation /ˈbiːti/ BEE-tee is so common that it is also or exclusively recorded in some reliable reference works.) (né Beaty; born March 30, 1937) is an American actor and filmmaker. His career has spanned over six decades, and he has received an Academy Award and three Golden Globe Awards. He also received the Irving G. Thalberg Award in 1999, the BAFTA Fellowship in 2002, the Kennedy Center Honors in 2004, the Cecil B. DeMille Award in 2007, and the American Film Institute Life Achievement Award in 2008.

A pioneer of the New Hollywood movement, Beatty has been nominated for 14 Academy Awards, including four for Best Actor, four for Best Picture, two for Best Director, three for Original Screenplay, and one for Adapted Screenplay – winning Best Director for Reds (1981). He was nominated for his performances as Clyde Barrow in the crime drama Bonnie and Clyde (1967), a quarterback mistakenly taken to heaven in the sports fantasy drama Heaven Can Wait (1978), John Reed in the historical epic Reds (1981), and Bugsy Siegel in the crime drama Bugsy (1991).

Beatty made his acting debut as a teenager in love in the Elia Kazan drama Splendor in the Grass (1961). He later acted in John Frankenheimer's drama All Fall Down (1962), Robert Altman's revisionist western McCabe & Mrs. Miller (1971), Alan J. Pakula's political thriller The Parallax View (1974), Hal Ashby's comedy Shampoo (1975), and Elaine May's road movie Ishtar (1987). He also directed and starred in the action crime film Dick Tracy (1990), the political satire Bulworth (1998), and the romance Rules Don't Apply (2016), all of which he also produced.

On stage, Beatty made his Broadway debut in the William Inge kitchen sink drama A Loss of Roses (1960) for which he was nominated for the Tony Award for Best Featured Actor in a Play.

== Early life and education ==
Henry Warren Beaty was born on March 30, 1937, in Richmond, Virginia. His mother, Kathlyn Corinne (née MacLean), was a teacher from Nova Scotia. His father, Ira Owens Beaty, studied for a PhD in educational psychology and was a teacher and school administrator, in addition to working in real estate. His grandparents were also teachers. The family was Baptist. During Warren's childhood, Ira Beaty moved his family from Richmond to Norfolk and then to Arlington and Waverly, then back to Arlington, eventually taking a position at Arlington's Thomas Jefferson Junior High School in 1945. During the 1950s the family resided in the Dominion Hills section of Arlington. Beatty's older sister is actress, dancer and writer Shirley MacLaine (who altered the phonetic spelling of her mother's maiden surname). His uncle by marriage was Canadian politician A.A. MacLeod.

Beatty became interested in movies as a child, often accompanying his sister to theaters. One film that had an important early influence on him was The Philadelphia Story (1940), which he saw when it was re-released in the 1950s. He noticed a strong resemblance between its star, Katharine Hepburn, and his mother, in both appearance and personality, saying that they symbolized "perpetual integrity". Another film that influenced him was Love Affair (1939), starring one of his favorite actors, Charles Boyer. He found it "deeply moving", and recalled that "[t]his is a movie I always wanted to make." He remade Love Affair in 1994, starring alongside his wife Annette Bening and Katharine Hepburn.

Among his favorite TV shows in the 1950s was the Texaco Star Theatre, and he began to mimic one of its regular host comedians, Milton Berle. Beatty learned to do a "superb imitation of Berle and his routine", said a friend, and often used Berle-type humor at home. His sister's memories of her brother include seeing him reading books by Eugene O'Neill or singing along to Al Jolson records. In Rules Don't Apply (2016), Beatty plays Howard Hughes, who is shown talking about and singing Jolson songs while flying his plane.

MacLaine noted — on what made her brother want to become a filmmaker, sometimes writing, producing, directing and starring in his films: "That's why he's more comfortable behind the camera ... He's in the total-control aspect. He has to have control over everything." Beatty doesn't deny that need; in speaking about his earliest parts, he said "When I acted in films I used to come with suggestions about the script, the lighting, the wardrobe, and people used to say 'Waddya want, to produce the picture as well?' And I used to say that I supposed I did."

Beatty played football at Washington-Lee High School in Arlington. Encouraged to act by the success of his sister, who established herself as a Hollywood star, he decided to work as a stagehand at the National Theatre in Washington, D.C. during the summer before his senior year. After graduation, he was reportedly offered ten college football scholarships, but turned them down to study liberal arts at Northwestern University (1954–55), where he joined the Sigma Chi fraternity. Beatty left college after his first year and moved to New York City to study acting under Stella Adler at the Stella Adler Studio of Acting. He often subsisted on peanut butter and jelly sandwiches, and worked odd jobs, including dishwasher, piano player, bricklayer's assistant, construction worker, and, relatively briefly, a sandhog.

== Career ==
=== 1957–1966: Early roles and breakthrough ===
Beatty started his career making appearances on television shows such as Studio One (1957), Kraft Television Theatre (1957), and Playhouse 90 (1959). He was a semi-regular on The Many Loves of Dobie Gillis during its first season (1959–1960). His performance in William Inge's A Loss of Roses on Broadway garnered him a 1960 Tony Award nomination for Best Featured Actor in a Play and a 1960 Theatre World Award. It was his sole appearance on Broadway.

In February 1960, Beatty enlisted as an airman third class in the California Air National Guard at Van Nuys to fulfill his military service obligation. He was discharged the following year due to a physical disability and remained on inactive duty after that time.

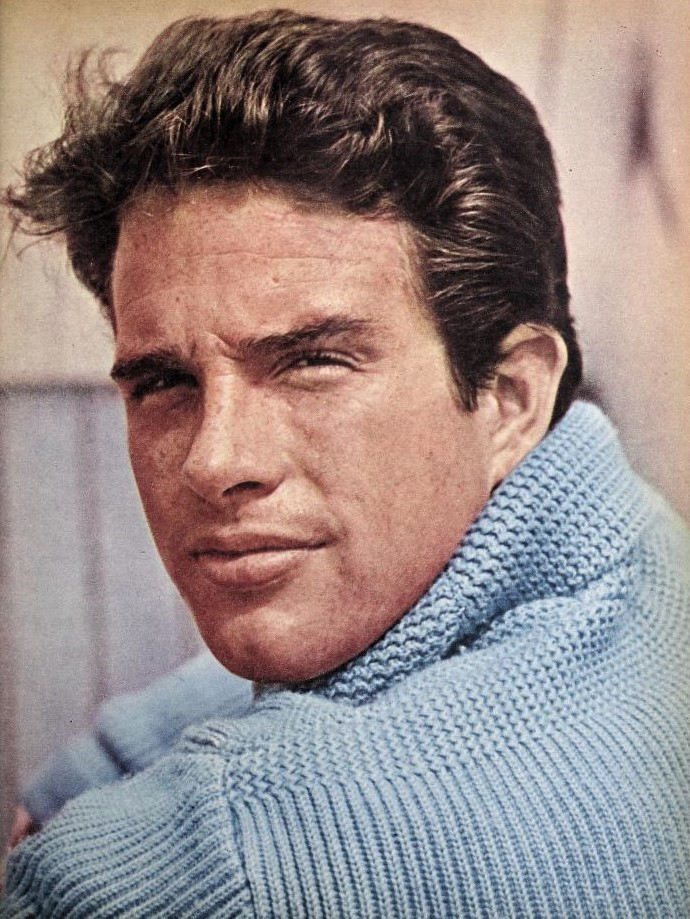
Beatty in Photoplay (1961)

Beatty made his film debut in Elia Kazan's Splendor in the Grass (1961) opposite Natalie Wood. The film was a major critical and box office success; Beatty was nominated for a Golden Globe Award for Best Actor and received the award for New Star of the Year – Actor. The film was also nominated for two Oscars, winning one.

Author Peter Biskind points out that Kazan "was the first in a string of major directors Beatty sought out, mentors or father figures from whom he wanted to learn." Years later during a Kennedy Center tribute to Kazan, Beatty told the audience that Kazan "had given him the most important break in his career." Biskind adds that they "were wildly dissimilar—mentor vs. protegé, director vs. actor, immigrant outsider vs. native son. Kazan was armed with the confidence born of age and success, while Beatty was virtually aflame with the arrogance of youth." Kazan recalls his impressions of Beatty:

Warren—it was obvious the first time I saw him—wanted it all and wanted it his way. Why not? He had the energy, a very keen intelligence, and more chutzpah than any Jew I've ever known. Even more than me. Bright as they come, intrepid, and with that thing all women secretly respect: complete confidence in his sexual powers, confidence so great that he never had to advertise himself, even by hints.

Beatty followed his initial film with Tennessee Williams' The Roman Spring of Mrs. Stone (1961), with Vivien Leigh and Lotte Lenya, directed by Jose Quintero; All Fall Down (1962), with Angela Lansbury, Karl Malden and Eva Marie Saint, directed by John Frankenheimer; Lilith (1963), with Jean Seberg and Peter Fonda, directed by Robert Rossen; Promise Her Anything (1964), with Leslie Caron, Bob Cummings and Keenan Wynn, directed by Arthur Hiller; Mickey One (1965), with Alexandra Stewart and Hurd Hatfield, directed by Arthur Penn; and Kaleidoscope (1966), with Susannah York and Clive Revill, directed by Jack Smight. In 1965, he formed a production company, Tatira, which he named for Kathlyn (whose nickname was "Tat") and Ira.

=== 1967–1979: Stardom and acclaim ===
Mr. Beatty's career has had all the hallmarks of the conventional Hollywood golden boy. Ingratiating good looks, disarming youthfulness, a delight in the social life and no apparently strong feelings about his craft. This image has now been strikingly shattered with his emergence as a vividly individual actor and as a highly imaginative producer in the gangster ballad, Bonnie and Clyde ... At 28 [sic], the image of Warren Beatty, fun-loving playboy, is dead. Warren Beatty, a man of the cinema, is born.

— Gerald Garrett, syndicated columnist

At age 30, Beatty produced and acted in Bonnie and Clyde, released in 1967. He assembled a team that included the writers Robert Benton and David Newman, and the director Arthur Penn. Beatty selected most of the cast, including Faye Dunaway, Gene Hackman, Estelle Parsons, Gene Wilder and Michael J. Pollard. Beatty also oversaw the script and spearheaded the delivery of the film. Beatty chose Gene Hackman because he had acted with him in Lilith in 1964 and felt he was a "great" actor. Upon completion of the film, he credited Hackman with giving the "most authentic performance in the movie, so textured and so moving", recalls Dunaway. Beatty had been so impressed by Gene Wilder after seeing him in a play, that he cast him without an audition for what became Wilder's screen debut. Beatty already knew Pollard: "Michael J. Pollard was one of my oldest friends", Beatty said. "I'd known him forever; I met him the day I got my first television show. We did a play together on Broadway."

Bonnie and Clyde became a critical and commercial success, despite the early misgivings by studio head Jack Warner who put up the production money. Before filming began, Warner said, "What does Warren Beatty think he's doing? How did he ever get us into this thing? This gangster stuff went out with Cagney." The film was nominated for ten Academy Awards, including Best Picture and Best Actor, and seven Golden Globe Awards, including Best Picture and Best Actor. Beatty was originally entitled to 40% of the film's profits but gave 10% to Penn, and his 30% share earned him more than US$6 million. After Bonnie and Clyde, Beatty acted with Elizabeth Taylor in The Only Game in Town (1970), directed by George Stevens; McCabe & Mrs. Miller (1971), directed by Robert Altman; and Dollars (1971), directed by Richard Brooks.

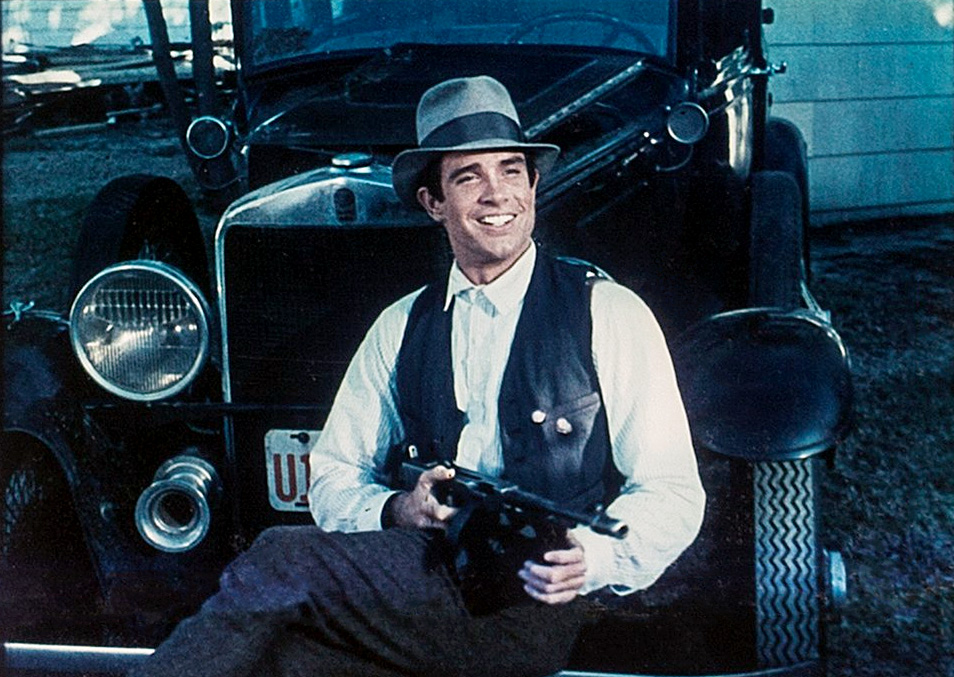
Beatty in a promo photo for Bonnie and Clyde (1967)

In 1972, Beatty produced a series of benefit concerts to help with publicity and fundraising in the George McGovern 1972 presidential campaign. Beatty first put together Four for McGovern at The Forum in the Los Angeles area, convincing Barbra Streisand, Carole King and James Taylor to perform. Streisand brought Quincy Jones and his Orchestra, and recorded the album Live Concert at the Forum. Two weeks later, Beatty mounted another concert at the Cleveland Arena, in which Joni Mitchell and Paul Simon joined James Taylor. In June 1972, Beatty produced Together for McGovern at Madison Square Garden, reuniting Simon and Garfunkel, Nichols and May, and Peter, Paul and Mary, and featuring Dionne Warwick. With these productions, campaign manager Gary Hart said that Beatty had "invented the political concert". He had mobilized Hollywood celebrities for a political cause on a scale previously unseen, creating a new power dynamic.

Beatty appeared in the films The Parallax View (1974), directed by Alan Pakula; and The Fortune (1975), directed by Mike Nichols. Taking greater control, Beatty produced, co-wrote and acted in Shampoo (1975), directed by Hal Ashby, which was nominated for four Academy Awards, including Best Original Screenplay, as well as five Golden Globe Awards, including Best Motion Picture and Best Actor.

In 1978, Beatty directed, produced, wrote and acted in Heaven Can Wait (1978) (sharing co-directing credit with Buck Henry). The film was nominated for nine Academy Awards, including Best Picture, Director, Actor, and Adapted Screenplay. It also won three Golden Globe Awards, including Best Motion Picture and Best Actor.

=== 1980–2001: Directorial debut and expansion ===
A film [Reds] of this scope and size demands incredible work from the director, and when you consider that Beatty also served as producer, writer and star, it's hard to believe so much work could come from one man. As a film, it's a marvelous view of America in the 1912–19 era, and Beatty brought some superior performances from a large cast.

— Joe Pollack, syndicated columnist

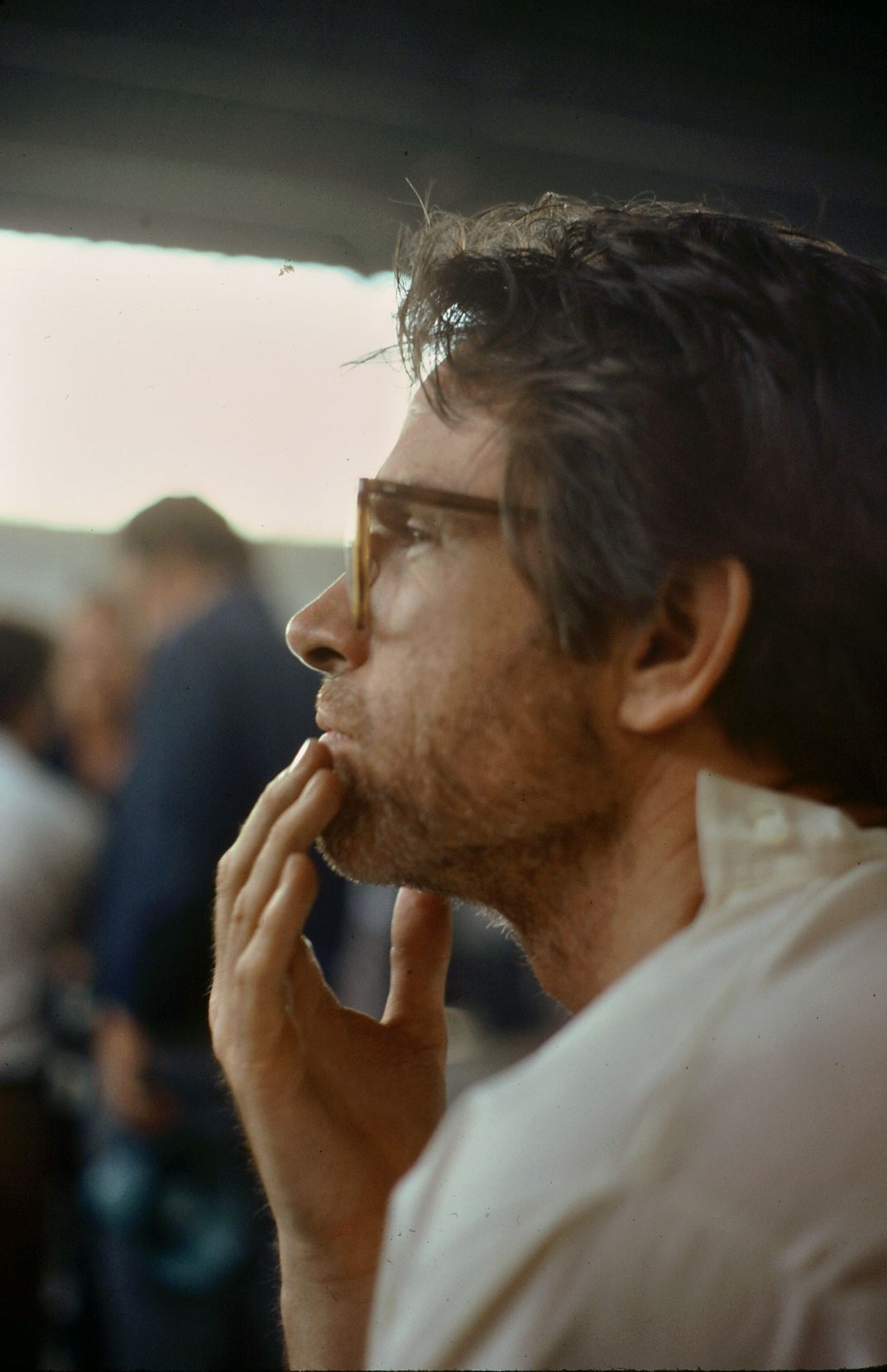
Warren Beatty on the set of the film Reds (1981)

Beatty's next film was Reds (1981), a historical epic about American Communist journalist John Reed who observed the Russian October Revolution –a project Beatty had begun researching and filming for as far back as 1970. It was a critical and commercial success, despite being an American film about an American Communist, made and released at the height of the Cold War. It received 12 Academy Award nominations – including four for Beatty (for Best Picture, Director, Actor, and Original Screenplay), winning three. Beatty won for Best Director, Maureen Stapleton won for Best Supporting Actress (playing anarchist Emma Goldman), and Vittorio Storaro won for Best Cinematography. The film received seven Golden Globe nominations, including Best Motion Picture, Director, Actor and Screenplay. Beatty won the Golden Globe Award for Best Director.

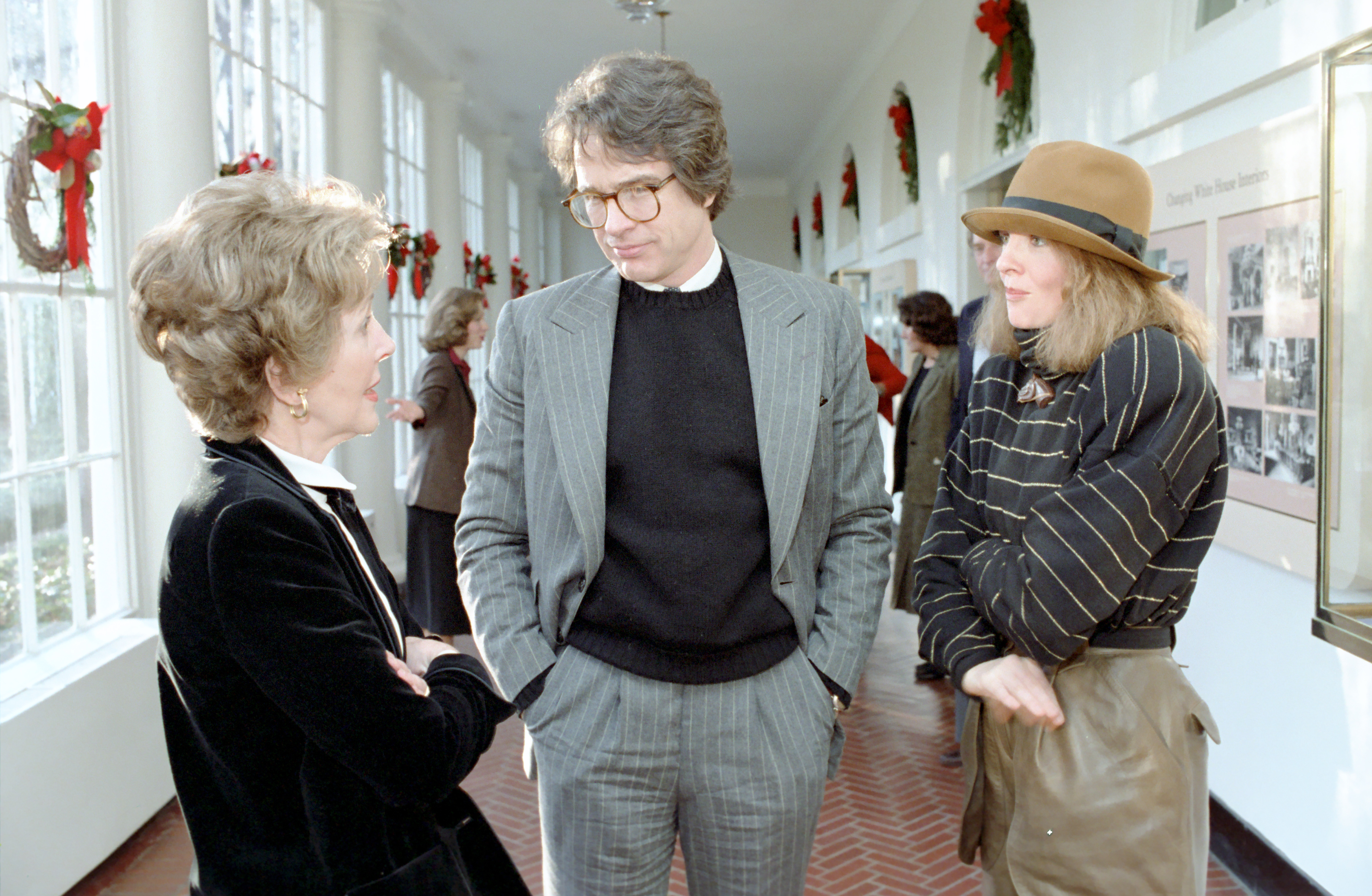
Beatty in 1981, with Diane Keaton and First Lady Nancy Reagan at a White House screening of Reds

Following Reds, Beatty did not appear in a film for five years until 1987's Ishtar, written and directed by Elaine May. Following severe criticism in press reviews by the new British studio chief David Puttnam just prior to its release, the film received mixed reviews and was unimpressive commercially. Puttnam attacked several other over-budget American films greenlighted by his predecessor and was fired shortly thereafter.

Under his second production company, Mulholland Productions, Beatty produced, directed and played the title role of comic strip-based detective Dick Tracy in the 1990 film of the same name. The film received positive reviews and was one of the highest-grossing films of the year. It received seven Academy Award nominations, winning three for Best Art Direction, Best Makeup, and Best Original Song. It also received four Golden Globe Award nominations, including Best Motion Picture.

In 1991, he produced and starred as the real-life gangster Bugsy Siegel in the critically acclaimed and commercially successful film Bugsy, directed by Barry Levinson, which was nominated for ten Academy Awards, including Best Picture and Best Actor; it later won two of the awards for Best Art Direction and Best Costume Design. The film also received eight Golden Globe Award nominations, including Best Motion Picture and Best Actor, winning for Best Motion Picture. Beatty's next film, Love Affair (1994), directed by Glenn Gordon Caron, received mixed reviews and was a commercial failure.

In 1998, Beatty wrote, produced, directed and starred in the political satire Bulworth, which was critically acclaimed and nominated for the Academy Award for Best Original Screenplay. The film also received three Golden Globe Award nominations, for Best Motion Picture, Best Actor, and Best Screenplay. Beatty has appeared briefly in numerous documentaries, including Madonna: Truth or Dare (1991) and One Bright Shining Moment: The Forgotten Summer of George McGovern (2005).

Following the poor box office performance of Town & Country (2001), in which Beatty starred, he did not appear in or direct another film for 15 years.

=== Since 2002: Output decline ===
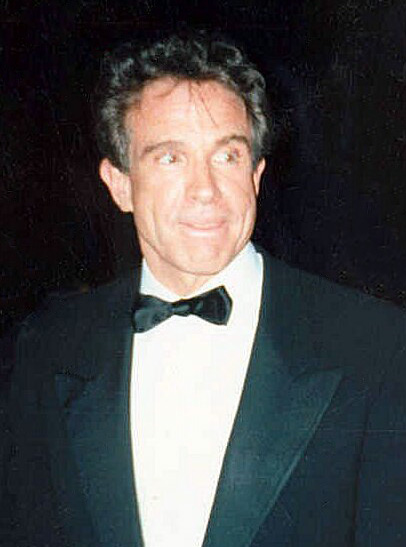
Beatty at the 62nd Academy Awards (1990)

In May 2005, Beatty sued Tribune Media, claiming he still maintained the rights to Dick Tracy. On March 25, 2011, U.S. District Judge Dean Pregerson ruled in Beatty's favor.

In 2010, Beatty directed and reprised his role as Dick Tracy in the 30-minute television special Dick Tracy Special, which premiered on TCM. The metafictional special features an interview with Tracy and film critic and historian Leonard Maltin, the latter of whom discusses the history and creation of Tracy. Tracy talks about how he admired Ralph Byrd and Morgan Conway who portrayed him in several films, but says he didn't care much for Beatty's portrayal of him or his film. The production of the special allowed Beatty to retain the rights to the character. At CinemaCon In April 2016, Beatty reiterated that he intends to make a Dick Tracy sequel. In 2023, Beatty reprised the role of Tracy and played the character opposite himself in Dick Tracy Special: Tracy Zooms In, a follow-up to the Dick Tracy Special that also aired on TCM. The 30-minute special, which mostly consists of a Zoom interview with Ben Mankiewicz and a returning Maltin in which Tracy criticizes aspects of the 1990 film adaptation to Beatty's face and suggests that a younger actor should take over the role of Tracy, concludes with Beatty and Tracy meeting in person and suggesting that Dick Tracy will return in the future.

Rules Don't Apply (2016)

Who else is better equipped to understand the symbiosis between show business and politics and to assert that when a certain degree of wealth and power have been achieved, the ordinary rules of human behavior can be flouted?... Fools and idiots abound, but demonic, systemic evil does not. Mr. Beatty obviously loves Hollywood, which has been good to him.

— Stephen Holden, The New York Times

In the mid-1970s, Beatty signed a contract with Warner Bros. to star in, produce, write, and possibly direct a film about Howard Hughes. The project was put on hold when Beatty began Heaven Can Wait. Initially, Beatty planned to film the life story of John Reed and Hughes back-to-back, but as he was getting deeper into the project, he eventually focused primarily on the Reed film Reds. In June 2011, it was reported that Beatty would produce, write, direct and star in a film about Hughes, focusing on an affair he had with a younger woman in the final years of his life. During this period, Beatty interviewed actors to star in his ensemble cast. He met with Andrew Garfield, Alec Baldwin, Owen Wilson, Justin Timberlake, Shia LaBeouf, Jack Nicholson, Evan Rachel Wood, Rooney Mara, and Felicity Jones. The film was eventually released under the title Rules Don't Apply, a fictionalized true-life romantic comedy set in 1958 Hollywood and Las Vegas. Beatty wrote, co-produced, directed, and starred alongside Alden Ehrenreich and Lily Collins, with supporting cast including Baldwin, Annette Bening, Matthew Broderick, Candice Bergen, Ed Harris, and Martin Sheen. It was released on November 23, 2016, and was Beatty's first film in 15 years. (Note: It began principal photography in February 2014 and wrapped in June of the same year.) Rotten Tomatoes' "Top Critics" gave the film a 55% "Rotten" rating. The film was also a commercial disappointment.

In 2017, Beatty reunited with his Bonnie and Clyde co-star Faye Dunaway at the 89th Academy Awards, in celebration of the film's 50th anniversary. After being introduced by Jimmy Kimmel, they walked out onto the stage to present the Best Picture Award. They had been given the wrong envelope, leading Dunaway to incorrectly announce La La Land as Best Picture, instead of the actual winner, Moonlight. This became a social media sensation, trending all over the world. In 2018, Beatty and Dunaway returned to present Best Picture at the 90th Academy Awards, earning a standing ovation upon their entrance, making jokes about the previous year's flub. Without incident, Beatty announced The Shape of Water as the winner.

== Personal life ==
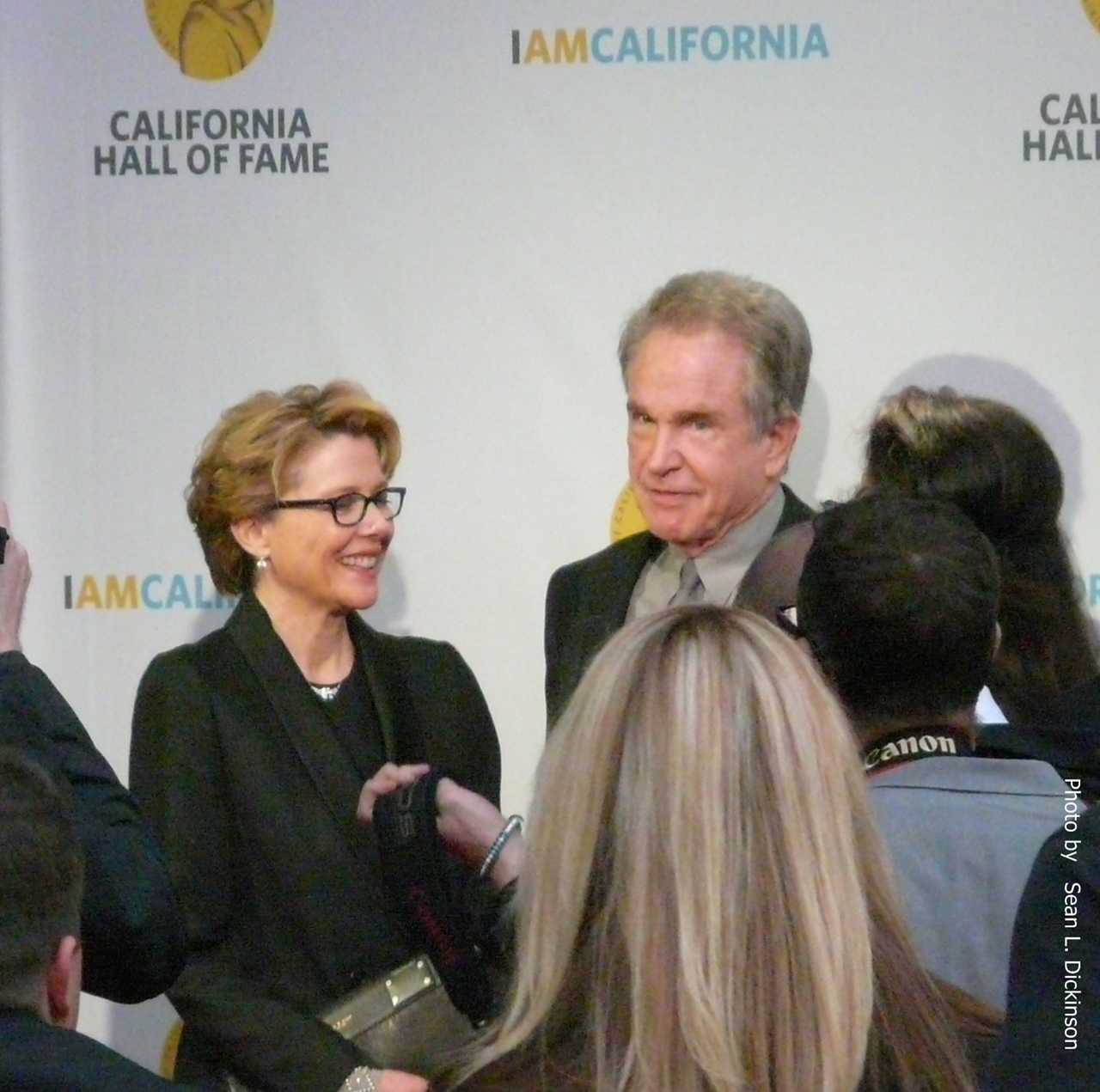
Beatty with his wife Annette Bening at the California Museum in 2013

Beatty has been married to actress Annette Bening since 1992. They have four children, including actress Ella Beatty.

Prior to marrying Bening, Beatty was notorious for his large number of romantic relationships that received generous media coverage, and having been linked to over 100 female celebrities. Early in his career, Beatty was engaged to Joan Collins; he later referred to the engagement as "an exaggeration." Cher, who briefly dated him, stated that "Warren has probably been with everybody I know." Leslie Caron said "Warren always had girlfriends who resembled his sister [Shirley MacLaine]". Caron thought he was too self-centered, and refused his marriage proposals. Carly Simon revealed in 2015 that the second verse of her 1972 song "You're So Vain" was about a previous romantic relationship with Beatty.

=== Activism ===
Beatty was a founding board member of the Center for National Policy, a founding member of the Progressive Majority, a member of the Council on Foreign Relations, has served as the Campaign Chair for the Permanent Charities Committee, and has participated in the World Economic Forum at Davos, Switzerland. He served on the Board of Trustees at the Scripps Research Institute, and the Board of Directors of the Motion Picture and Television Fund Foundation. He was named Honorary Chairman of the Stella Adler Studio of Acting in 2004. Director and collaborator Arthur Penn described Beatty as "the perfect producer", adding, "He makes everyone demand the best of themselves. Warren stays with a picture through editing, mixing, and scoring. He plain works harder than anyone else I have ever seen."

=== Political views ===
Beatty is a longtime supporter of the Democratic Party. In 1972, he was part of the "inner circle" of Senator George McGovern's presidential campaign. He traveled extensively and was instrumental in organizing fundraising. Despite differences in politics, Beatty was also a friend of Republican Senator John McCain, with whom he agreed on the need for campaign finance reform. He was chosen by McCain to be one of the pallbearers at the senator's funeral in 2018.

== Filmography ==
=== Film ===
Year	Title	Director	Producer	Writer
1967	Bonnie and Clyde	No	Yes	No
1975	Shampoo	No	Yes	Yes
1978	Heaven Can Wait	Yes (Note: Co-directed with Buck Henry)	Yes	Yes
1981	Reds	Yes	Yes	Yes
1987	Ishtar	No	Yes	No
1990	Dick Tracy	Yes	Yes	No
1991	Bugsy	No	Yes	No
1994	Love Affair	No	Yes	Yes
1998	Bulworth	Yes	Yes	Yes
2016	Rules Don't Apply	Yes	Yes	Yes

Acting roles

Year	Title	Role
1961	Splendor in the Grass	Bud Stamper
1961	The Roman Spring of Mrs. Stone	Paolo di Leo
1962	All Fall Down	Berry-Berry Willart
1964	Lilith	Vincent Bruce
1965	Mickey One	Mickey One
1965	Promise Her Anything	Harley Rummell
1966	Kaleidoscope	Barney Lincoln
1967	Bonnie and Clyde	Clyde Barrow
1970	The Only Game in Town	Joe Grady
1971	McCabe & Mrs. Miller	John McCabe
1971	Dollars	Joe Collins
1974	The Parallax View	Joseph Frady
1975	Shampoo	George Roundy
1975	The Fortune	Nicky Wilson
1978	Heaven Can Wait	Joe Pendleton
1981	Reds	John Reed
1987	Ishtar	Lyle Rogers
1990	Dick Tracy	Dick Tracy
1991	Bugsy	Bugsy Siegel
1994	Love Affair	Mike Gambril
1998	Bulworth	Sen. Jay Billington Bulworth
2001	Town & Country	Porter Stoddard
2016	Rules Don't Apply	Howard Hughes

=== Television ===
Year	Title	Director	Writer	Notes
2010	Dick Tracy Special	Yes	Yes	Co-directed with Chris Merrill
2023	Dick Tracy Special: Tracy Zooms In	Yes	Yes	Co-directed with Chris Merrill

Acting roles

Year	Title	Role	Episode(s)
1957	Kraft Television Theater	Roy Nicholas	"The Curly Headed Kid"
1957	Westinghouse Studio One	1st Card Player	"The Night America Trembled"
1957	Suspicion	Boy	"Heartbeat"
1959	Look Up and Live	Boy	"The Square"
1959	Look Up and Live	Boy	"The Family"
1959	Playhouse 90		"Dark December"
1959	The Many Loves of Dobie Gillis	Milton Armitage	"The Best Dressed Man"
1959	The Many Loves of Dobie Gillis	Milton Armitage	"The Sweet Singer of Central High"
1959	The Many Loves of Dobie Gillis	Milton Armitage	"Dobie Gillis, Boy Actor"
1960	The Many Loves of Dobie Gillis	Milton Armitage	"The Smoke-Filled Room"
1960	The Many Loves of Dobie Gillis	Milton Armitage	"The Fist Fighter"
1960	Alcoa Presents: One Step Beyond	Harry Grayson	"The Visitor"
1998	The Larry Sanders Show	Himself	"Flip"
2010	Dick Tracy Special	Dick Tracy	TV special
2023	Dick Tracy Special: Tracy Zooms In	Dick Tracy / Himself	TV special

Theatre

Year	Title	Role	Venue	Ref.
1959	A Loss of Roses	Kenny	Eugene O'Neill Theatre, Broadway	

== Awards and nominations ==
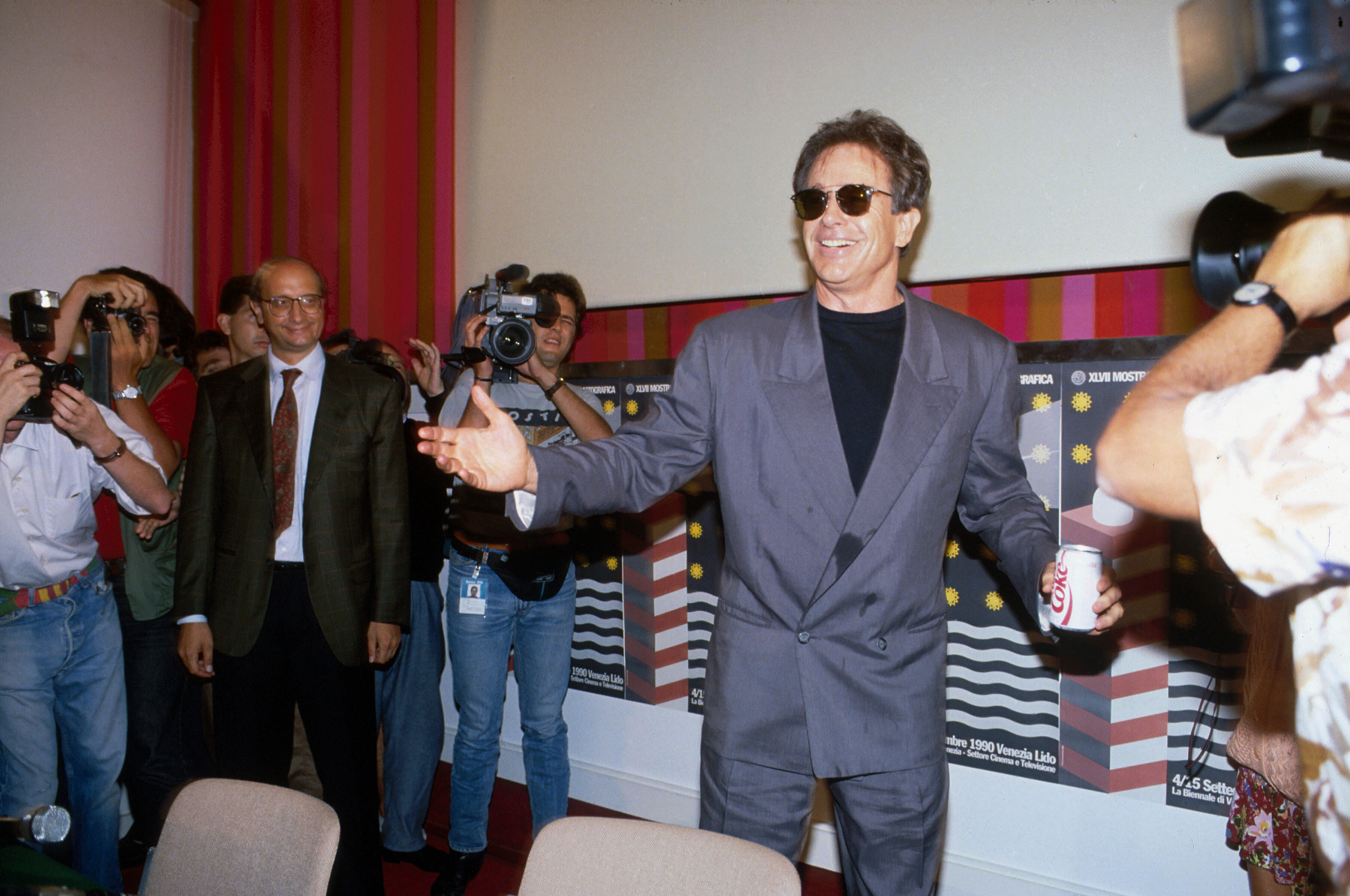
Beatty at the 47th Venice International Film Festival in 1990
