= Summer of My German Soldier =

1973 book by Bette Greene

- First edition
- Author: Bette Greene
- Language: English
- Genre: Young adult fiction
- Publisher: Dial Press
- Publication date: 1973
- Publication place: USA
- Media type: Book
- Pages: 230
- ISBN: 0803783213
- Followed by: Morning Is a Long Time Coming

Summer of My German Soldier is a 1973 book by Bette Greene. The story focuses on the friendship between a young Jewish-American girl and an escaped German POW in a small town in the Southern United States during World War II. The novel was an ALA Notable Book, a New York Times Outstanding Book, and a National Book Award Finalist. It was followed by a sequel, Morning Is a Long Time Coming (1978). A television adaptation was also produced in 1978, starring Kristy McNichol and Bruce Davison.

== Summary ==
The story is told in first person narrative by Patricia Anne Bergen, a 12-year-old Jewish girl living in Jenkinsville, Arkansas near the end of World War II. Patty is intelligent and curious, but also naïve and unworldly. At the beginning of the novel, Patty has low self-esteem brought on by her mother's criticism of her appearance and her father's abuse.

When a group of German POWs visits her father's department store, Patricia meets Fredrick Anton Reiker, a rifleman who comes from Göttingen, but is half-English. His English-educated father is a professor of history who gets into trouble for making fun of Hitler in lectures. Anton has no sympathy either with the Nazi party or its ideology.

Anton teaches Patty that she is a person of value. In return, she protects Anton by hiding him above her father's garage, telling only her family's African-American maid, Ruth Hughes.

Anton is almost exposed when he sees Patty's father beating her one day and runs out of hiding to protect her, but she shouts for him to go back before he is seen. Before long, the FBI comes to town, searching for Anton. When they call at the Bergens' home, Patty runs out to the garage to warn Anton that he must leave immediately or he will be caught. Anton flees from the garage after thanking Patty for her help and gives her a valuable ring that belonged to his grandfather. Anton escapes from Jenkinsville and makes it to New York City, where he is discovered and shot while trying to escape. The FBI return to the Bergens' house and relay the news of Anton's death to Patty, who is devastated.

Appalled to hear that his own daughter aided a Nazi prisoner, Patty's father disowns her. The only person who still talks to her is Ruth, who has now been fired from her job as housekeeper for keeping Patty's secret. Patty stands trial for treason, where she is convicted and sentenced to reform school. Patty plans to visit Anton's mother in Germany after the war is over.

== Adaptations ==
In 1978, the novel was turned into a made-for-television film of the same name, starring Kristy McNichol as Patty and Bruce Davison as Anton. It was well received, winning a Humanitas Prize, and three Primetime Emmy Award nominations (with Esther Rolle winning "Best Supporting Actress" for her portrayal of Ruth). In the film version, the town of Jenkinsville is set in the state of Georgia, not Arkansas, and Patty does not stand trial for treason or is sent to reform school but is judged to be a juvenile delinquent and remanded into her parents custody until she is 18. (Note: the opening credits to the film state the town is in Georgia, and Patty's father informs her of what the state's justice system will do to her.)

== Reception ==
Summer of My German Soldier was an ALA Notable Book, a New York Times Outstanding Book, a Golden Kite Award winner, and a National Book Award Finalist. Greene's work was described as "courageous and compelling" by Publishers Weekly.

It is also one of the most banned or challenged books of 2000-2009 according to the American Library Association, coming in at number 55.
