= The Equalizer (1985 TV series) season 3 =

The Equalizer
- Season 3
- Season 3 American DVD cover
- Starring: Edward Woodward; Keith Szarabajka
- No. of episodes: 22

Release
- Original network: CBS
- Original release: September 23, 1987 – May 4, 1988

Season chronology
- ← Previous; Season 2 Next → Season 4

The third season of The Equalizer premiered September 23, 1987 and ended May 4, 1988 on CBS.

== Synopsis ==
In this season, McCall goes against an atheist bomber, a Wall Street raider, two hit-men, more KGB, more Mafia, a serial killer, a sexploiter pimp/pornographer, a deranged dramatist, an alcoholic AIDS avoider, a murderous master manipulator, a greedy diplomat, an enemy espionage agent, a lost lover, welfare slumlord scammers, a psycho ransoming rapist, a psycho stalker ex-husband, a psycho murderer ex-con, a vengeful industrialist, a casino boss, and a protégé turned femme fatale.

He stops a mass-murder at a mass, defends a developmentally disabled man, frees a scientist-defector, saves an army career, prevents a psychic's fatal future, thwarts thespian threats to the theatre troupe, saves a six-year-old, reunites a father and son, derails dancer danger, turns teens from thug-life, rescues a reporter from revenge, liberates a kidnapped boy, helps an amnesic woman, frees hostages, houses a homeless family, protects two single mothers, one single father, and two families of three.

McCall is arrested once, shot thrice, forgives an enemy, loses a friend, gains a daughter, and buys a bar.

== Episodes ==
| No. overall | No. in season | Title | Directed by | Written by | Original release date | Prod. code | Rating/share (households) |
|---|---|---|---|---|---|---|---|
| 45 | 1 | "Blood and Wine" | Alan Metzger | Coleman Luck | September 23, 1987 | 63102–A 63102–B | 14.4/24 |
| 46 | 2 | "Blood and Wine" | Alan Metzger | Coleman Luck | September 23, 1987 | 63102–A 63102–B | 14.4/24 |
Part 1: Martin Loeber blows up the Harlequin Club, "and that's just the beginning" he tells The Times, calling himself "Alpha." Linda prepares as an anchorperson announces 20 dead. What animal would do that? Loeber, "You're beautiful when you're terrified." She knows him as music teacher Brad Hartman. Brother Joseph Heiden meets with FBI Special Agent Frank Standish. An Agent questions motive, the second Agent asks who he hates? Heiden, "He hates God." Robert McCall and Mickey Kostmayer save Agency operative Rudy Bagler from a thugs. Linda's mother Elizabeth Thomas finds "Brad's" shotgun. Linda doesn't believe her because it's now gone. Elizabeth calls The Equalizer. Loeber tries to kill them both. Loeber asks a Police Officer, was Elizabeth alone? McCall escaped. He tells Control it was a professional hit. Mickey surveils Loeber. McCall asks Rudy to check his Manhattan Network for hit-men. Loeber learns McCall's identity from his contact Kroslick. Mickey puts a tracker on Loeber's car, but Loeber has his own locater. He drives to Standish's house, plants a nitro-bomb on Mrs. Standish, and kills an FBI agent in a fiery car crash. Det. Standish arrives on-scene with Brother Heiden, who McCall sees, and recognizes. Part 2: McCall tells Standish that "Brother" Heiden is a terrorist. Standish is undeterred. McCall describes how Loeber could've faked his death. McCall finds a dentist and a crematorium, while Mickey watches Linda. Heiden narrows likely targets to a religious festival. A young nun tells Loeber about a mass by a blind monsignor. He tells Benjamin Harris to find him "a new pair of eyes" (i.e., contacts), and takes the VX nerve crystals Harris procured. McCall finds the crematorium destroyed, and the dentist gone, according to his cleaning lady. Heiden describes his conversion, but McCall replies how his godson died at Heiden's hands. Loeber dupes Linda into helping him, claiming McCall killed her mother. McCall learns about the stolen VX from Control. Loeber poisons Standish, putting him in critical condition. Rudy demands $100,000 for Loeber's new "eyes" or he'll give him to McCall. Loeber offers Rudy more to kill McCall. They meet, but Loeber escapes, abducting Mickey and Linda. Loeber gives McCall instructions to save them. Loeber interrupts Heiden's prayers, shoots him, and assumes the monsignor's identity. McCall must diffuse a bomb, Brother Heiden must stop a mass, and Heiden asks McCall to forgive him.
| 47 | 3 | "Suspicion of Innocence" | Russ Mayberry | Robert Eisele | September 30, 1987 | 63110 | 14.0/24 |
An intellectually challenged department store shipping clerk, Davy Baylor, witnesses the murder of his coworker Cheryl Jansen. Afraid the police will shoot, he flees and calls "Mr. Equalizer" for help. McCall takes him to Lt. Kramer, who thinks his motive was sexual. The prints match, as Davy inadvertently touched the pipe. Despite McCall's objections, Davy goes to The Tombs. McCall meets Davy's mother Irene, who can't see Davy until his arraignment. The D.A. requests remand for psychiatric evaluation. The Bailiff has no time to react when Davy panics and flees. McCall prevents the court officer from shooting him, then bluffs Lt. Kramer about Davy's location. McCall takes Davy back to crime scene to relive that night, hoping for clues. He asks Jimmy for a background on Cheryl. Evidently, Will Rattigan wanted her to leave her husband for him but she wouldn't. McCall rattles Will, so Will goes to his father Jack asking him to provide an alibi. Irene dupes Jimmy to get Davy away from McCall. Davy flees his mother's grasp, and the killer comes looking for him.
| 48 | 4 | "In the Money" | Aaron Lipstadt | Ed Waters & Scott Shepherd | October 7, 1987 | 63101 | 14.2/24 |
Norm Jameson and Craig Rose abduct Samantha Chesborough from her apartment. McCall and Mickey find the body; still alive! Mickey protects her while McCall investigates. Jameson chases the actual target, Fraunces Tavern waitress Wendy Muller, who is run down by Rose's car. But Wendy left a clue for Samantha, so McCall talks to Sandy at Fraunces Tavern, who tells him about Wendy's "playmate" C.R. Heaton who performs mergers and acquisitions; the "King of Junk Bonds." Drawn into Wall Street's dark underbelly, McCall presses Heaton, who panics and calls risk arbitrageur Ron Parrish about Wendy. Parrish cuts Heaton loose to deal with the SEC on his own. Facing economic ruin and jail time for insider trading, Heaton shoots himself. Jonah hacks "Ma Bell" for phone records on who called Heaton before his suicide. McCall sets a trap with the help of his carny contact, Freddy.
| 49 | 5 | "Encounter in a Closed Room" | Jim Johnston | Story by : Ann Lewis Hamilton & Scott Shepherd; Teleplay by : Ann Lewis Hamilton | October 14, 1987 | 63108 | 12.7/22 |
A TV reporter interviews Czechoslovak genetic scientist Dr. Peter Kapik about his DNA breakthrough shortly before Kapik escapes his Russian handlers. Peter visits his friend Alina Jennings and her husband Wayne, but State Department Agent Foster takes Kapik into custody. Alina meets her mother, but KGB agent Sarka confronts her; she knows she is Alina Polivka who defected from Russia. Sarka threatens her parents, Emil and Vera Polivka, unless Alina does a job. Alina notices another Russian spy, and calls The Equalizer, but Control wants McCall to disassociate. McCall contacts NYPD Detective Sgt. Alice Shepard, who transferred to Intelligence Division. Shepard meets Alina, who is watched by Sarka, who is now watched by McCall. Sarka tells Alina to kill Peter or her parents will die. McCall and Shepard track down Emil's "Wolf" clue, which leads to Nordic Nights Import/Export. Alina confesses to Wayne that the KBG have her parents, and goes to meet Peter to kill him. McCall tries to rescue her parents, but is captured, so he must improvise to escape. Sarka goes after Kapik herself.
| 50 | 6 | "Mission: McCall" | Alan Metzger | Ed Waters & Scott Shepherd | October 28, 1987 | 63117 | 13.4/24 |
| 51 | 7 | "Mission: McCall" | Alan Metzger | Story by : Ed Waters & Coleman Luck; Teleplay by : Ed Waters & Scott Shepherd & Robert Eisele | November 4, 1987 | 63118 | 13.1/23 |
Part 1: Scott McCall visits his father Robert but the place is trashed. A masked man with a gun in his tattooed hand escapes. Control gives Scott a ticket out of town, but he follows Robert's contingency plan instead; a video recording to contact Mickey. Mickey leads Scott to former Agency colleague Richard Dyson, via Zudo's Curios, but Zudo isn't cooperative. Scott and Mickey meet Dyson, who is actually Southern Control. Control wants Dyson "out of this" but Dyson has leverage. So Control confesses Robert was to be exchanged for twelve Agency agents, but the KGB took him first. Dyson tells Mickey that Harley Gage was the best man they ever had in Moscow, so they free Gage from prison. Gage meets his KGB lover Francesca, who questions his loyalty. Dyson confronts Control that the KGB doesn't have Robert; Control does, which angers Scott. Control explains that Robert would've given himself up to save a dozen colleagues, so he kidnapped Robert to save his life and buy more time. Francesca and Borda invade Control's safe house, killing Weber/Cronin to get to Robert, but he resists and is shot. Part 2: Mickey and Scott hold Control at the safe house so he can't undermine them, while Dyson and Gage infiltrate the Russian regional facility to rescue Robert. Control distracts Scott to transmit a code from his watch which summons his agents to free him. After Gage kills Kamarov, he seduces Dr. Zara Klemik to get her pass to the lower level where Robert is held. Dyson knocks out some soldiers to get their passes. Colonel Vlasov suspects Dr. Klemik and follows her while she gets a message from her "top secret" contact, Tangent Zero (Control); she has two infiltrators! So she arranges to help Dyson and Gage. Dyson gives her a surprise present for the control room to help them escape.
| 52 | 8 | "Shadow Play" | Russ Mayberry | Robert Eisele | November 11, 1987 | 63119 | 12.8/21 |
Defense Department Logistical Officer Maj. Andrew Banks testifies at a Congressional hearing about arming and training Angolan counter-revolutionaries, while his counsel advises him. The Congressman demands to know who ordered him. Banks, I know him only as "Control." Meanwhile, Chacon sets up a sniper position, but cannot get a clean shot. An agent tells Det. Shepard that security was pulled and her intelligence unit is disbanded. Outside, Chacon makes another attempt on Banks; Banks and Shepard defend each other. Alice goes to Robert about the shooting, so Harley and Mickey offer to help while Robert recovers (after events in "Mission: McCall"). Control warns Gage off, but Gage asks Rudy Bagler what he knows about Lyle Murdoch the Federal Agent in Charge, William Virgil a DOD agent with White House ties, and Renaldo Duran an international banker with Mafia ties to Meyer Lansky. Chacon hunts down Gage at McCall's apartment. McCall suspects Control, but Gage, suspecting Bagler, barges passed his butler Robbie and threatens him; Rudy claims Virgil set up Banks. McCall consults Billy Bump and gets a codename; Excelsior. A shootout ensues and Chacon grabs Shepard. Mickey, Gage, Banks and McCall all try to save Shepard.
| 53 | 9 | "Inner View" | Marc Laub | Jim Trombetta | November 18, 1987 | 63106 | 13.2/24 |
Psychic Karen Alden is awoken from a surreal dream at the police station by a female detective who advises her not to hold anything back or be named an accessory to murder. McCall is there as well, trying to convince a Lieutenant that Miss Sarah Hendricks has identified the Scrapbook Killer. Karen asks her detective who he is; The Equalizer. She calls him after having a vision of the killer's next murder. Since McCall is still working with Sarah, he asks Harley Gage to help Karen, but they find nothing yet. Sheila Stainback interrupts the football match with breaking news; the Scrapbook Killer's latest murder, and a body at the Brooklyn pier that Karen and Gage just left. Karen provides Gage details that he recognizes as lyrics to a song by Archon called "Shadow Man." McCall checks in when Gage is nearly shot. Gage returns to talk to Archon's singer Jarret and is threatened by their roadie. Gage gives a description; Jarret gives a name. Sarah and Karen trade notes, and McCall uses Karen's vision to their advantage. End-credits: This episode is dedicated to the memory of Ernie Palinkas whose contribution to The Equalizer was invaluable.
| 54 | 10 | "The Rehearsal" | Alan Metzger | Robert Eisele | December 2, 1987 | 63113 | 9.9/17 |
McCall and Harley Gage watch as Everett Austin directs Sandra Benning and Josh in a stage play rehearsal. Someone watches from above in the lighting bridge, calling to Sandra saying, "Elise." She alerts McCall, mentioning that someone has left her romantic notes. They find the phone lines cut, the stage door jammed, and all the exits booby trapped with bombs. With a janitor scheduled to arrive who will set off the bomb, they have one hour to find who set the trap. McCall and playwright Jenna Rydell get separated from the rest. She finds an old playbill from Dark Night, another of Austins' productions, starring Elise de Venn and her boyfriend Michael. Stage manager Phil Davine explains to Gage what happened a year ago, revealing a motive to his madness.
| 55 | 11 | "Christmas Presence" | Michael O'Herlihy | Coleman Luck | December 16, 1987 | 63120 | 13.4/24 |
For his Christmas tradition, McCall takes Gage to his favorite restaurant, but it's "For Sale," so he finds his old Company friend, Pete O'Phelan. At Kelly's Bar, Kelly Stigman, Bishop, Spicer, and Martin conspire to do something about six year-old Mickey Robertson who has AIDS; they don't want him in the neighborhood. Stigman throws a smoke grenade into Mickey's room that starts a fire. His grandmother Phyllis Robertson tells an investigator who can't or won't help, so Mickey calls "Mr. Manhattan." McCall gives Gage his Christmas Gift; to meet Mickey and check out Kelly's bar. Gage also talks to Dr. Feinberg, who says Mickey's father Dave Burton is still alive, but unable or unwilling to visit, because Mickey's mother was an intravenous smack addict. While Gage confronts Dave, masked men trash the Robertsons' apartment. McCall says he'll do some undercover work on Stigman, and for back-up, sends Pete to Gage.
| 56 | 12 | "A Dance on the Dark Side" | Jonathan Perry | David Lightstone | January 13, 1988 | 63104 | 12.2/21 |
Detective Charlie Kelly claims undercover cop Del Larkin fed lies to the Organized Crime Task Force about Bruno Dominic, and threatens to turn Del in. They struggle and Charlie is shot. Larkin slips into Captain Maldisi's office to use the phone. Police switchboard operator Risa takes a break, leaving only Jill O'Connor on duty. Jill accidentally overhears Larkin talking to a woman about Kelly's death. She tries telling Detective Bates, but he can't be bothered. Jill's life is threatened, so she calls McCall. He meets with Maldisi and Det. Shepard who is on temporary attachment with the task force. Shepard takes Jill's statement and contacts IAB. Del meets Simone Peters and wonders what to do. At the funeral, Robert asks Charlie's wife Maureen about Del, who he confronts, despite Alice's objections. Gage gets Larkin's phone records with Dominic and Simone; McCall takes a calculated risk. At Pete's restaurant, the team learns about Simone's other identity, Susan Petersborough, and her profession. They race to Jill's dance class to save her from being silenced.
| 57 | 13 | "The Child Broker" | Mark Sobel | Mick Curran | January 20, 1988 | 63105 | 13.9/24 |
Eddie is killed by a car while being chased by a gang of boys, Danny Winters, Bobby, Press, Slick, and Streak who are led by the manipulative and ruthless Shep Morrow. Morrow's girlfriend Sylvie ensures their loyalty with money and seduction. Sensing that Danny is troubled, his girlfriend Amy tries to help. But Morrow turns up at Danny's home to get him ready for a robbery. Amy calls The Equalizer to save Danny from Morrow. Danny's single mother, Irene Winters, is also worried, so she applies some tough love. After Amy and Gage are threatened, McCall sets up Morrow with the help of Gage and a fellow agent.
| 58 | 14 | "Video Games" | James A. Contner | Peter McCabe | January 27, 1988 | 63122 | 13.4/24 |
Chauffeur Eddie Mason drives Christine Hayes to Warren Briggs, where a receptionist connects clients with high-end call girls. Briggs blackmails Gina Harper with her video tape, then pays Christine to be with Serge while he records them. Afterwards, Eddie pays her to "just talk." His wife Angela meets The Equalizer through Pete at her restaurant. She says Eddie is an investigative reporter who is missing. His boss Rennick tells Gage about Eddie's story on prostitution. Gage pilfers Eddie's notes that lead to a hotel clerk, who talks about the "stunning broads" Eddie sees. Christine is found strangled to death, with her madam's message on her machine. Gage knows Joy Tang, who he leverages for her client list. D.A. Francis Scanlon owes McCall, so he tells Gage about the "whore wars" and that Christine was going to testify. Gage follows Eddie driving Suzanne, and confronts him. Eddie finds his daughter Janelle's tape and attacks Briggs, so Steiner grabs Eddie. Now, McCall and Gage must rescue Eddie.
| 59 | 15 | "Something Green" | Luis Soto | Kevin Droney | February 10, 1988 | 63123 | 11.9/20 |
Paul Gephardt tells his mother Anne, "I spy something red," as she prepares to start her day. Greedy diplomat Raymond Gephardt plans on keeping ten million dollars he has been laundering for corporate raiders and mobsters. But it's not enough; he also wants to kidnap his son and heir away from his ex-wife. NYPD Detective Lt. Borley is first on-scene, but he says diplomatic immunity has tied his hands. Anne asks McCall to stop them from leaving the country. Inside the consulate, Paul tells his father, "I spy something blue," but Raymond doesn't understand. Mobsters make an attempt on Raymond. Kostmayer and Gage fire back. Stanley and Vesco abduct Paul from Debra. McCall and Gage pressure Raymond's go-between lawyer Mr. Binder for the Paul's location. During the shoot-out, Raymond escapes with Paul. "Daddy, I spy something green...is mommy here?"
| 60 | 16 | "The Mystery of Manon" | Bradford May | Coleman Luck | February 17, 1988 | 63112 63111 | 11.9/19 |
| 61 | 17 | "The Mystery of Manon" | Bradford May | Coleman Luck | February 24, 1988 | 63112 63111 | 9.3/17 |
Part 1: Inspector Phillipe Marcel is summoned to Brighton Park Zoo and, seemingly, shown his long-dead wife, Manon Brevard Marcel. He sees experiments from 1985, Vladivostok Labor Camp, and Instructions to kill Control and McCall within 24 hours or Manon dies. A newscaster reports on a timber wolf released from the zoo, as Robert and Jimmy listen. Control delivers bad news about Ben Silva, and good news about Yvette Marcel. Yvette asks McCall to help her father. Control gets the files on Manon. Scott finds an amnesiac woman. McCall finds a tape with a particular song from Manon's past; he suspects Control planted it. McCall finally tells Scott the truth about Yvette. Control tasks Sterno to find Phillipe. Yvette sees Manon outside McCall's apartment. Phillipe tells Control and McCall to meet him at the zoo; to kill them. But someone shoots Phillipe as Yvette arrives. Phillipe dies telling her the truth about McCall. Part 2: Scott and Yvette embrace as siblings. Yvette and McCall come to an understanding. The amnesiac woman resurfaces, and Scott finds her beaten and bloody. She sees a photo of Control and McCall and screams; listening in from a bug is Arthur Trent. Scott, Yvette, Control and McCall compare notes. McCall, Control, and Sterno must discover the true identity of the woman who believes she is Manon, expose the shadowy party controlling her, and rescue Scott who has been taken captive.
| 62 | 18 | "No Place Like Home" | Tobe Hooper | Robert Eisele | March 16, 1988 | 63124 | 13.5/24 |
On a street full of homeless people a raggedy man asks McCall for food. Bill Whitaker arrives home to find his evicted wife Paula. While an HRA/DSS social worker finds them shelter, their son Billy calls The Equalizer. A security guard shuffles them to a squalid room. Jim Harding tries to scam Bill and they fight. McCall warns Harding off, and asks Jimmy to find the owner, while Mickey protects them. While Vegas surveils, Mrs. Morales says Harding threatened her. The guard prevents entry to reporter Jackie Chenier, who's doing a documentary on the Alexandria. Mickey shows Bill a homestead renovation; "a chance to work for a place...to call my home." Jimmy reports the hotel was bought (i.e., stolen) by Mr. Amar from Robert Nichols, who McCall talks with next. McCall "makes things very unpleasant for Mr. Amar," by subletting Amar's own apartment, as he's informed by the doorman. Amar calls Vegas to frame and kill Bill – then McCall.
| 63 | 19 | "Last Call" | Michael O'Herlihy | Robert Crais | March 23, 1988 | 63121 | 13.2/24 |
Psycho rapist Lewis Fipps leaves a red-light grindhouse followed by his compliant brother Frank as shots are fired by international hit-man Gant. Pete O'Phelan declares, "last call." The young, beautiful Susan tries to lift a purse from Lucy. Ben just wants to pay his tab and leave, while Mickey argues with Lucy's husband Joe to let Susan go without pressing charges. Lewis and Frank run in, take everyone hostage, and warns Gant about all the collateral damage inside. Frank tries calling for help, but the line is cut. Mickey suggests an alternate method; enter The Equalizer. Lewis tells him to kill Gant or he'll start killing hostages. McCall asks Woody to hack Fipps' criminal record, and provide his mercenary contacts. McCall asks Jameson about Gant's motive; $500,000 payable by the raped and mutilated girl's father, Vincent Brennard. When neither Gant nor Fipps back down, McCall must intervene before anyone is killed, or raped.
| 64 | 20 | "Regrets Only" | James A. Contner | Robert Crais | March 30, 1988 | 63126 | 14.0/25 |
Susan Foxworth is walking with Mark and a car follows her. She yells and kicks the car thinking it's her psychopathic, stalker ex-husband, Dr. Gary Edward Foxworth. Instead, an irate woman jumps out and yells back. At home, Gary calls her again and again. It's "a little hard to believe" for Detective Bishop. Susan calls McCall, who confronts Gary after talking with his assistant Marge. Gary claims Susan is mentally unbalanced. McCall refers Susan to a counselor. Gary attacks her in the market. After Pete O'Phelan and McCall mull it over, he pleads with Bishop, but she still won't act. Mickey investigates Gary's background, while McCall "pushes back," setting Gary off. A skinhead takes Gary to buy a gun from Young. Gary hires him to "stomp" someone; himself. McCall is arrested for aggravated assault. Bishop hands McCall a restraining order. Mickey tries to convince Sister Sara to show him Gary's student files. McCall confronts Bishop with the malicious, vindictive, chilling facts. They act.
| 65 | 21 | "Target of Choice" | Mark Sobel | Kevin Droney | April 6, 1988 | 63127 | 14.2/24 |
Jonathan Grey gets a surprise party from his son Devin and wife Marian, who is disabled by multiple sclerosis. Joy fades when flowers arrive from paroled murderer, Willie J. Hawkins. Hawkins terrorizes Johnny's family in revenge for testifying. Marian calls McCall. Kostmayer tails Hawkins. D.A. Francis Scanlon says Hawkins staged the murder to claim it wasn't premeditated, avoiding murder one (25 to life) to get manslaughter (8 years). Hawkins goes to ground so McCall has Jimmy and Pete guard Marian. Marian visits her doctor Claudia; Hawkins is already there. Cellmate Roscoe Lee Boyd looks for Hawkins too, but Mickey and Jimmy are prepared. Mickey rattles Hawkins, who pays a hooker to check out Mickey. McCall confronts Boyd, who goes after Hawkins himself, but Hawkins has a plan. McCall must hurry to save Hawkins' "target of choice" and end the terror.
| 66 | 22 | "Always a Lady" | Marc Laub | Story by : Scott Shepherd; Teleplay by : Peter McCabe | May 4, 1988 | 63125 | 11.9/21 |
At his casino, Tony Costa discovers $800,000 missing. He suspects McCall's former protégé, Meredith Browning. To find it, he tasks Johnny Sax. McCall and Pete return from the theater, and Meredith calls for help. McCall's mind flashes back to Honeywell, Southern Control, and Meredith captured. McCall arrives, but apparently, Meredith was murdered. McCall tells Sgt. Alice Shepard she ran a Company "travel agency." Detective Barry Calloway reports, "Shotgun blast to the head...no prints." Wondering, McCall reminisces and calls her name. A hooker, Cynthia, breaks his dream. "For $200 you can call me Meredith all night long." Control sends Mickey and Pete to the funeral. Angela tells McCall she worked for Meredith in "customer relations" but coworker Donna Morgan was fired. Cousin Jean Carson returns Meredith's bracelet; McCall's gift inscribed, "Always a Lady." Mickey produces the medical examiner's report and says Donna must've skipped town. By request, Alice has Sax arrested. McCall sets a trap for Costa and Sax. Calloway tells Shepard they still haven't found the money. McCall suspects where to look.

== Cast and characters ==
=== Main ===
- Edward Woodward as Robert McCall
- Keith Szarabajka as Mickey Kostmayer

=== Recurring ===
- Maureen Anderman as Pete O'Phelan
- Melissa Sue Anderson as Yvette Marcel
- Charles Cioffi as Lt. Kramer
- Maurice Hines as Billie Bump
- Richard Jordan as Harley Gage
- Robert Lansing as Control
- John Bedford Lloyd as D.A. Francis Scanlon
- Mark Margolis as Jimmy
- Irving Metzman as Sterno
- Christopher Murney as Rudy Bagler
- Chad Redding as Sgt. Alice Shepard
- Ken Solarino as Jeremy
- William Zabka as Scott McCall
- Anthony Zerbe as Phillipe Marcel

=== Notable guest stars ===
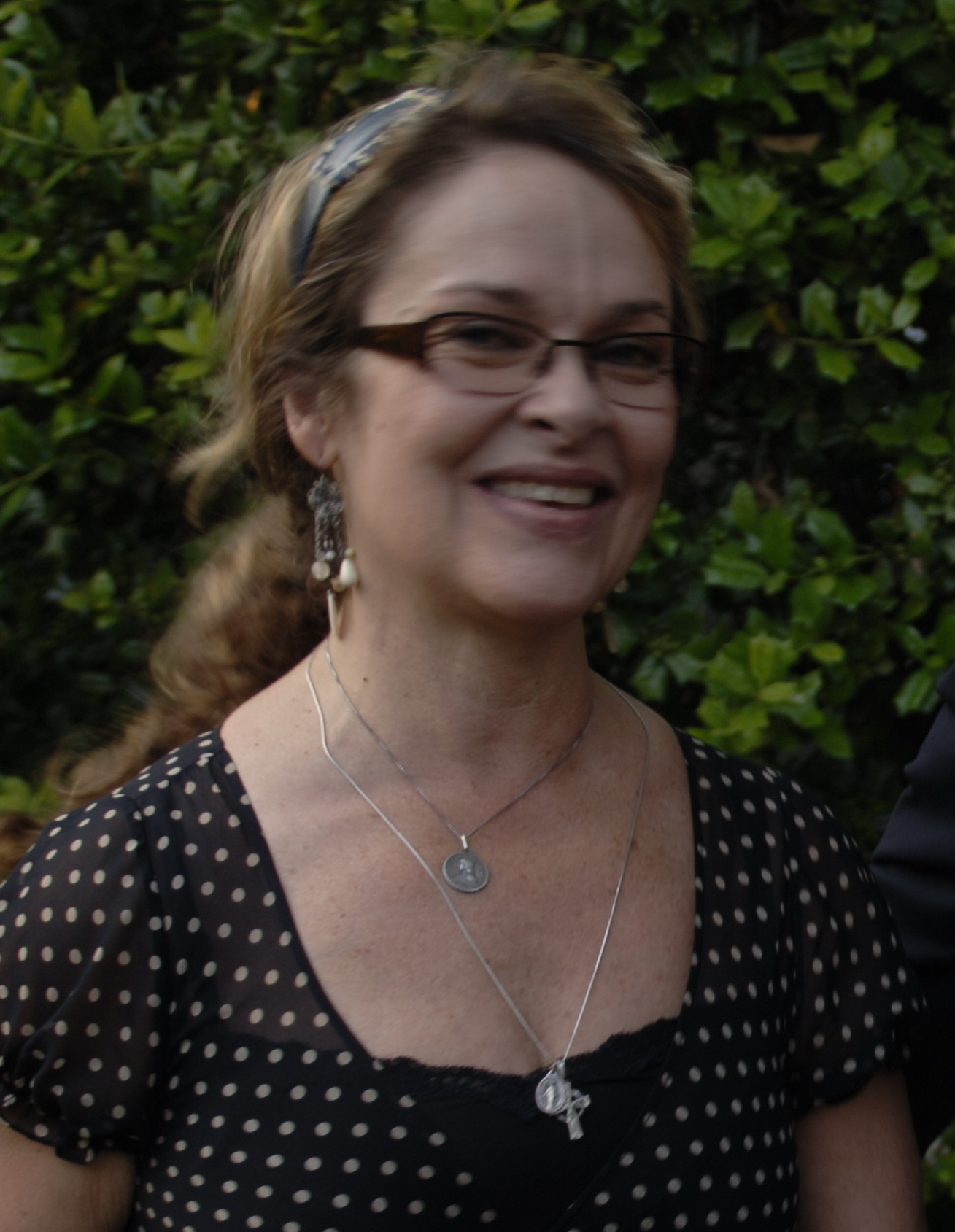
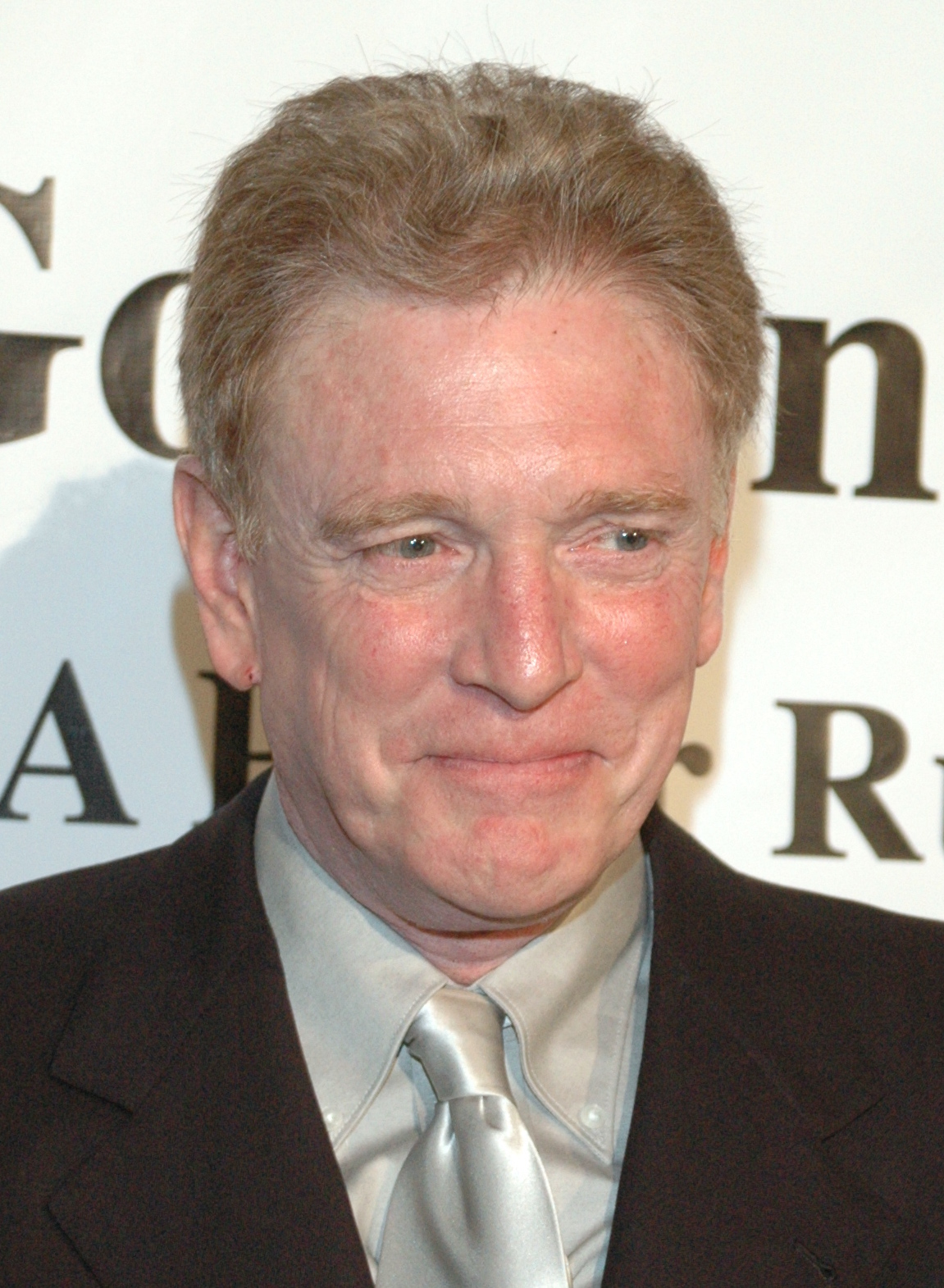
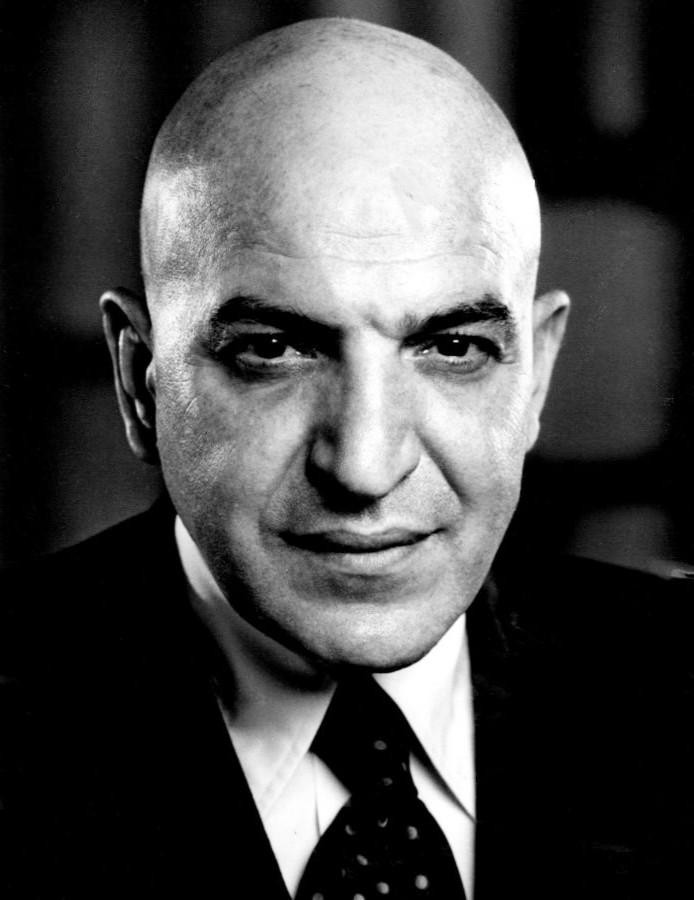
Savalas, Atherton & Sinise
- Telly Savalas as Brother Joseph Heiden, who used to be a terrorist (with Loeber as his protégé) until Heiden began seeing a strange man mourning his horrific acts. He describes his conversion to McCall, who finds it hard to believe and forgive because Heiden killed his godson.
- William Atherton as Martin "Alpha" Loeber (alias Brad), a Marxists that hates God and religion, thus he sets out to kill as many as he can, starting with a blind monsignor.
- Moira Harris as Linda, Loeber's girlfriend who he uses as "cover." She doesn't want to believe anything bad about "Brad" from McCall, Mickey or even her own mother.
- Tom Atkins as FBI Special Agent Frank Standish, leader of an FBI-NYPD Joint Task Force to apprehend Loeber.
- Elizabeth Franz as Mrs. Elizabeth Thomas, Linda's mother who knows "Brad" is up to no good.
- Lynne Thigpen as Cleaning Lady, for the dentist that McCall never finds.
- Lee Breuer as Benjamin Harris, who "procures" anything Loeber needs to carry out his nefarious plan.
- Nicholas Georgiade as Agent #2, part of the JTF who hears Brother Heiden's briefing.
- Ted Beniades as a Police Officer, who responds when Mrs. Thomas and McCall are rammed by a truck and knocked into the water.
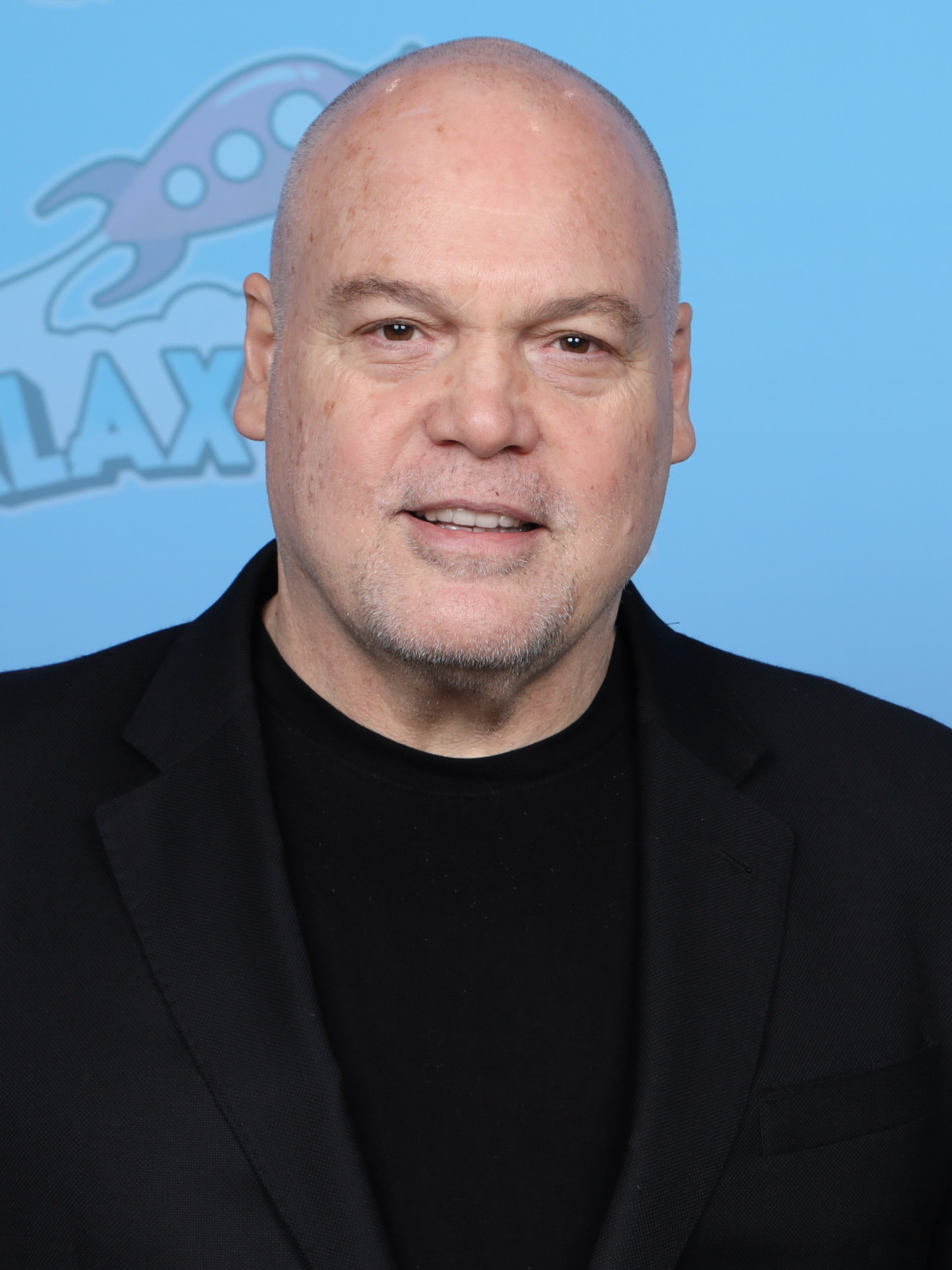
D'Onofrio
- Vincent D'Onofrio as Davy Baylor, a mentally disabled man falsely accused of the murder of his coworker Cheryl Jansen (played by co-star Mary Kane).
- William Converse-Roberts as Will Rattigan, another of Davy's coworkers who was having an affair with Cheryl.
- Ann Wedgeworth as Irene Baylor, Davy's "hovering" mother who can't seem to let go and allow his independence.
- John Randolph as Jack Rattigan, Will's father, who is disappointed in himself for battering his own wife for years in front of his son, and disappointed in his son for not learning compassion and overcoming his father's abusive disease. Thus he is through making excuses for Will, refusing him an alibi.
- James Eckhouse as the District Attorney, who requests remand for Davy to undergo psychiatric evaluation.
- Nancy Giles as the court Bailiff.
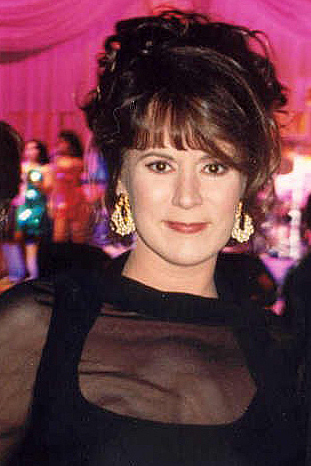
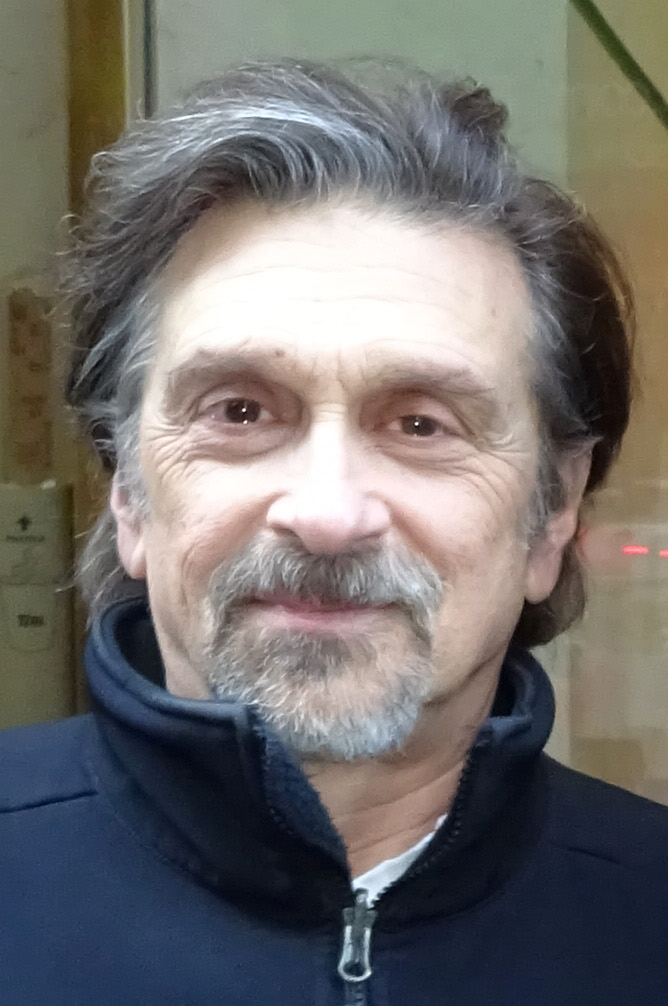
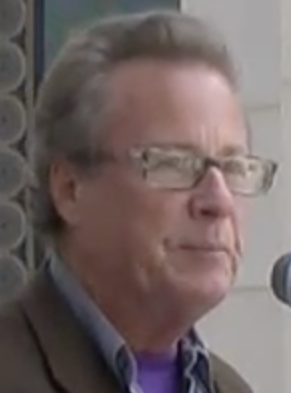
Heard, Boutsikaris & Richardson
- John Heard as Ron Parrish, a Wall Street risk arbitrageur who uses criminal means and other people's funds to enrich himself.
- Dennis Boutsikaris as C.R. Heaton, who is left hanging to answer to the U.S. Securities and Exchange Commission, facing economic ruin and jail time for insider trading.
- Ashley Crow as Samantha Chesborough, who is mistaken for Fraunces Tavern waitress Wendy who is targeted for murder by Parrish, because Wendy, as Heaton's girlfriend, learned of their crimes and tried blackmailing them.
- Patricia Richardson as Sandy, who hangs about Fraunces Tavern hoping for the right opportunity to present itself, or himself, or both. She provides McCall insight into Wendy's connection to Heaton.
- Oliver Platt as Norm Jameson, a thug who does Parrish's bidding by going after Wendy when they realize they abducted the wrong woman, Samantha.
- Paul Perri as Craig Rose, a thug who does Parrish's bidding by going after Wendy when they realize they abducted the wrong woman, Samantha.
- David J. Steinberg as Freddy, a carny who helps McCall engineer a unique way of setting up Parrish to prove his murderous, criminal intent to law enforcement.
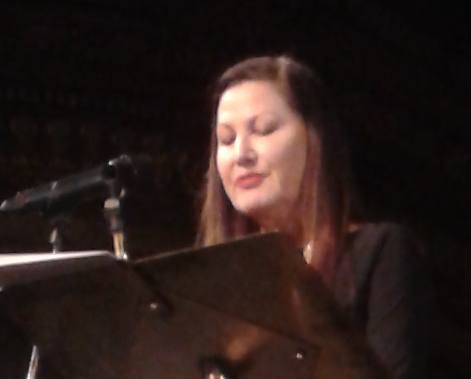
Komorowska
- Michael Moriarty as Dr. Peter Kapik, a Czechoslovak genetic scientist who has made a DNA break-through that could be very valuable to the Soviet Eastern Bloc for its potential use in biological warfare. Kapik seizes an opportunity to break free of his Russian handlers to see an old flame.
- Maureen Mueller as Alina Jennings née Polivka, Peter Kapik's old flame, who has since married Wayne. As a defector herself, Alina is leveraged by Sarka to set up Kapik to be captured, or failing that, to kill him herself. Failure will result in her parents being killed.
- Jamey Sheridan as Wayne Jennings, Alina's husband.
- Liliana Komorowska as Sarka, the KGB Agent tasked with setting up or killing Kapik; she threatens to kill Alina's parents if Alina doesn't complete the mission.
- George Gerdes as a Russian Spy.
- Adam LeFevre as Foster, a State Department agent who takes Dr. Kapik into protective custody.
- Lola Pashalinski as Vera Polivka, Alina's Mother.
- Warren Keith as a TV Reporter.
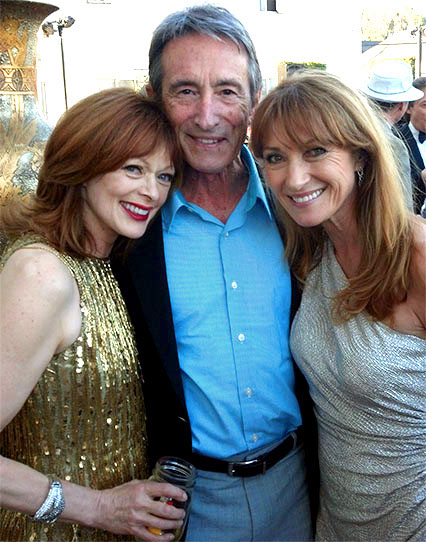
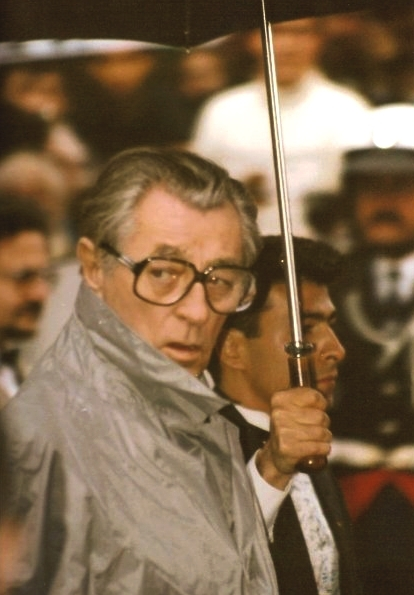
Mitchum & Fisher
- Robert Mitchum as Richard Dyson, Southern Control and Robert McCall's former Agency colleague. When Dyson learns McCall was abducted by the KGB, he suggests breaking Harley Gage out of prison, as Gage was their best agent in Moscow. Dyson and Gage will infiltrate the Russian regional facility to rescue Robert. Control (Lansing) and Southern Control (Mitchum) are work against each other at cross-purposes, with Dyson trying to locate and free McCall and Control trying to keep him sequestered, providing the actors a chance to shine dramatically.
- Frances Fisher as Francesca, a KGB agent trying to capture Robert McCall before he can be used in a prisoner exchange. She was also Gage's handler and lover in Moscow.
- Frankie Faison as Zudo, owner of a Curio shop.
- Joseph Tobin as Weber/Cronin, an Agency operative.
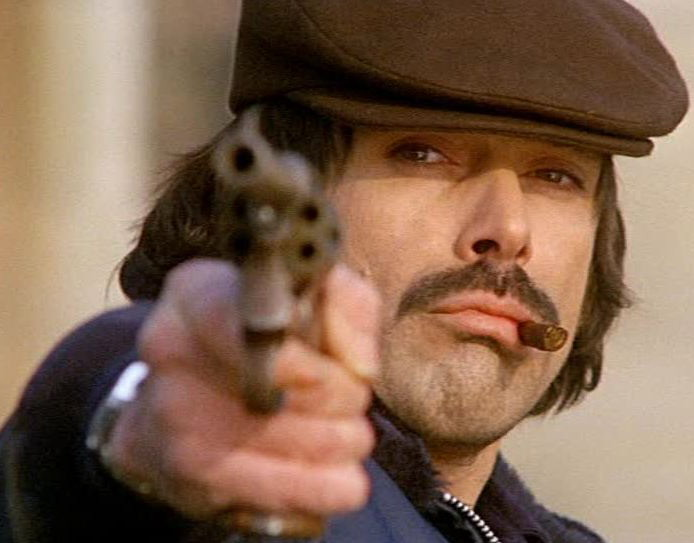
Milian
- J. T. Walsh as Andrew Banks, a career Army Major, who is now a Logistical Officer for the United States Department of Defense. As a witness called to testify at a Congressional Hearing, he has made himself the target of assassination to prevent exposing criminal activity, separate but, related to the arming and training of Angolan counter-revolutionaries, which was ordered by Control.
- Tomas Milian as Renaldo Duran, a Cuban international banker and financier with ties to the Mafia, including Meyer Lansky. Thus Duran has no qualms against hiring a hitman to take out Banks.
- Gerry Bamman as an unnamed Congressman, who poses the questions to Banks at the hearing.
- Paul Calderón as Chacon, a hit-man hired to kill Banks.
- Walter Bobbie as William Virgil, a Department of Defense agent.
- Ethyl Eichelberger as Bagler's Butler.
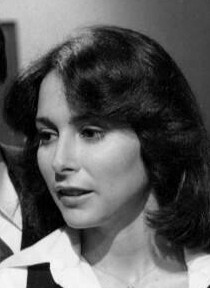
Kalem
- Katherine Cortez as Karen Alden, a psychic with an "Inner View" who has been having visions of murders committed by the so-called Scrapbook Killer. The female detective at the precinct doesn't believe her, so Karen calls The Equalizer after seeing McCall and Sarah talking about the killer to a Lieutenant. Karen provides Harley Gage details that lead to the killer.
- Terrence Mann as Shadow Man, a fan of the rock band Archon, who imagines he is the "Shadow Man" from Archon's new single.
- Toni Kalem as Sarah Hendricks, who has identified the Scrapbook Killer from a composite sketch after he assaulted her in a subway train. Sarah helps by providing a bracelet that triggers Karen's vision of the killer.
- Starletta DuPois as a Female Detective, who warns Karen to tell the truth, or be named an accessory to murder.
- Paul Hipp as Jarret, the lead singer of Archon.
- Ron Vawter as a Lieutenant, who is very dismissive of McCall and Sarah.
- Tim Cappello as a Roadie for rock band Archon.
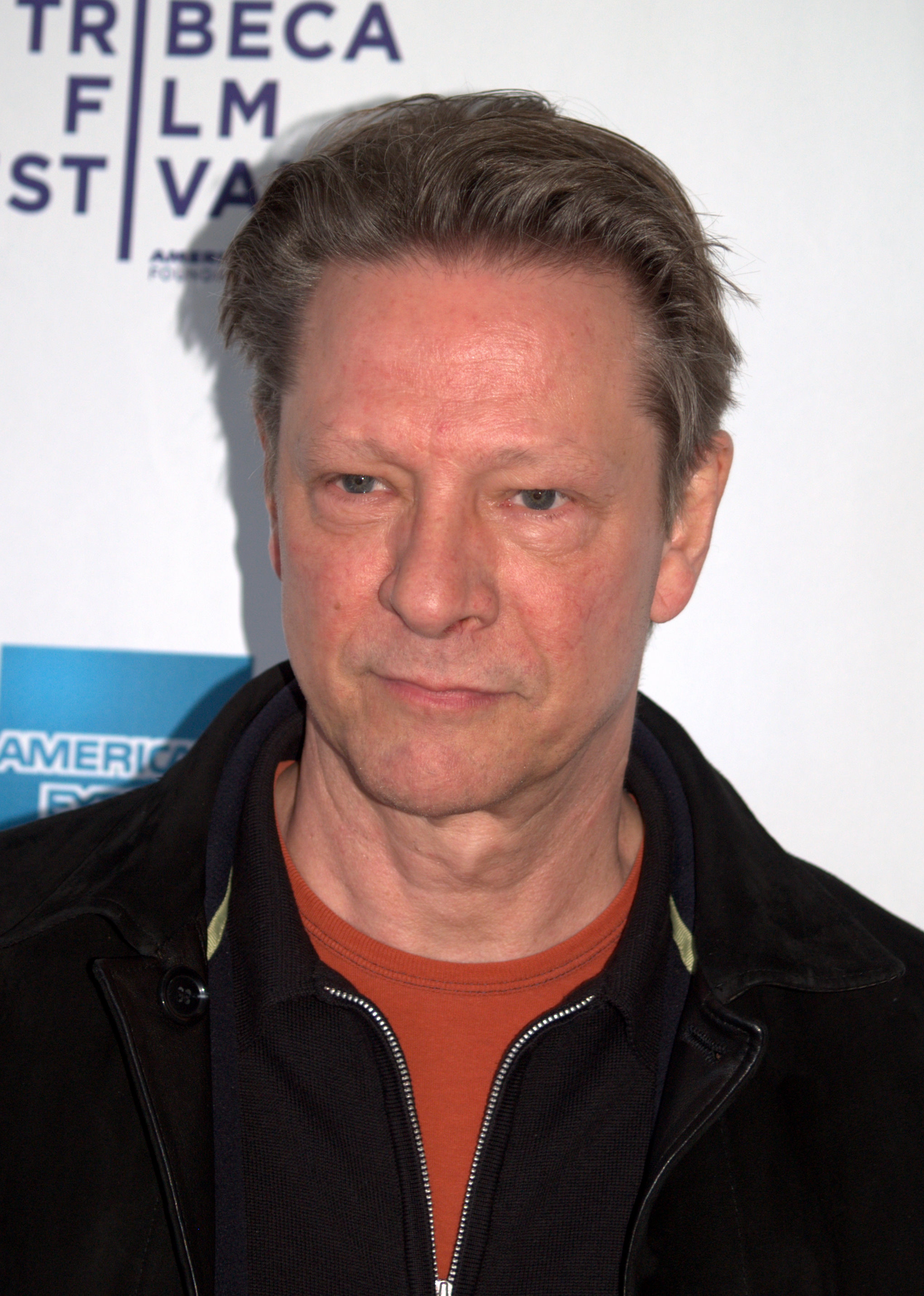
Cooper
- Chris Cooper as Michael, a deranged former stage actor who had been horribly disfigured, and now haunts the theatre, fixated on actress Sandra Benning, who he mistakes as his beloved Elise.
- George Morfogen as Everett Austin, director of a play's stage production.
- Jennifer Van Dyck as Sandra Benning, an actress who has been receiving romantic notes left in her dressing room.
- Ned Eisenberg as Josh, an actor for the play.
- Jacqueline Brookes as Phyllis Robertson, grandmother to Mickey who lost his mother to AIDS, having contracted it intravenously as a heroin addict.
- Martin Shakar as Kelly Stigman, owner of Kelly's Bar, who hates having a kid sick with AIDS in his neighborhood. He rouses his buddies into ousting him and his grandmother. But Kelly has his own sickness to hide.
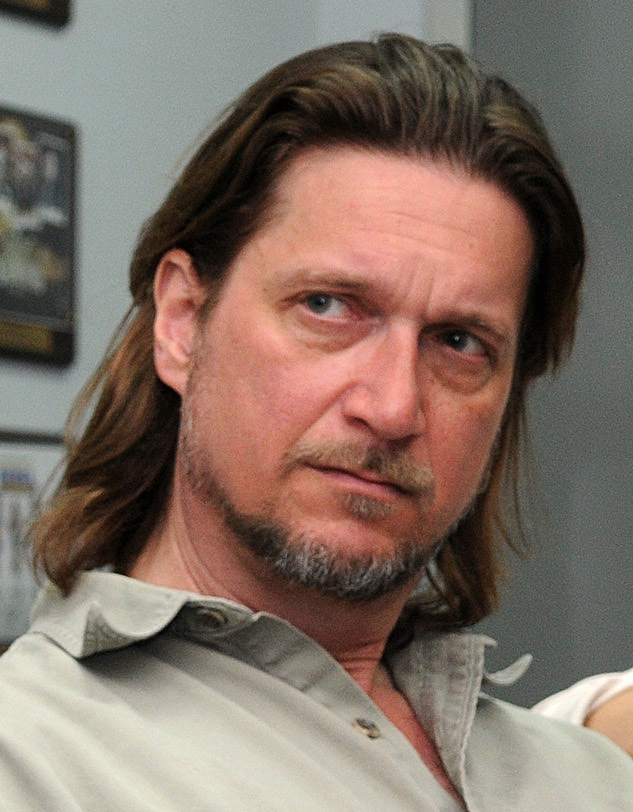
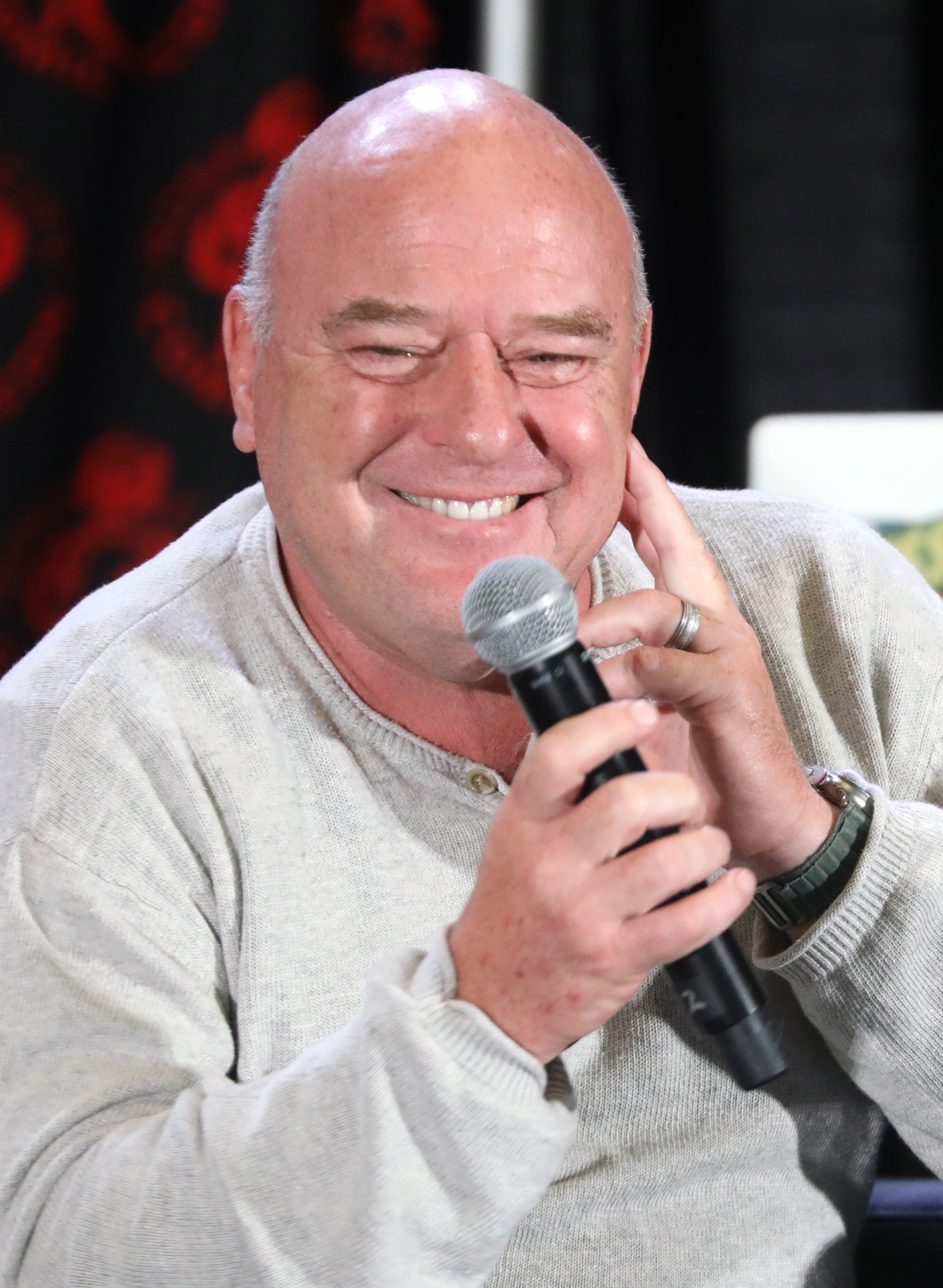
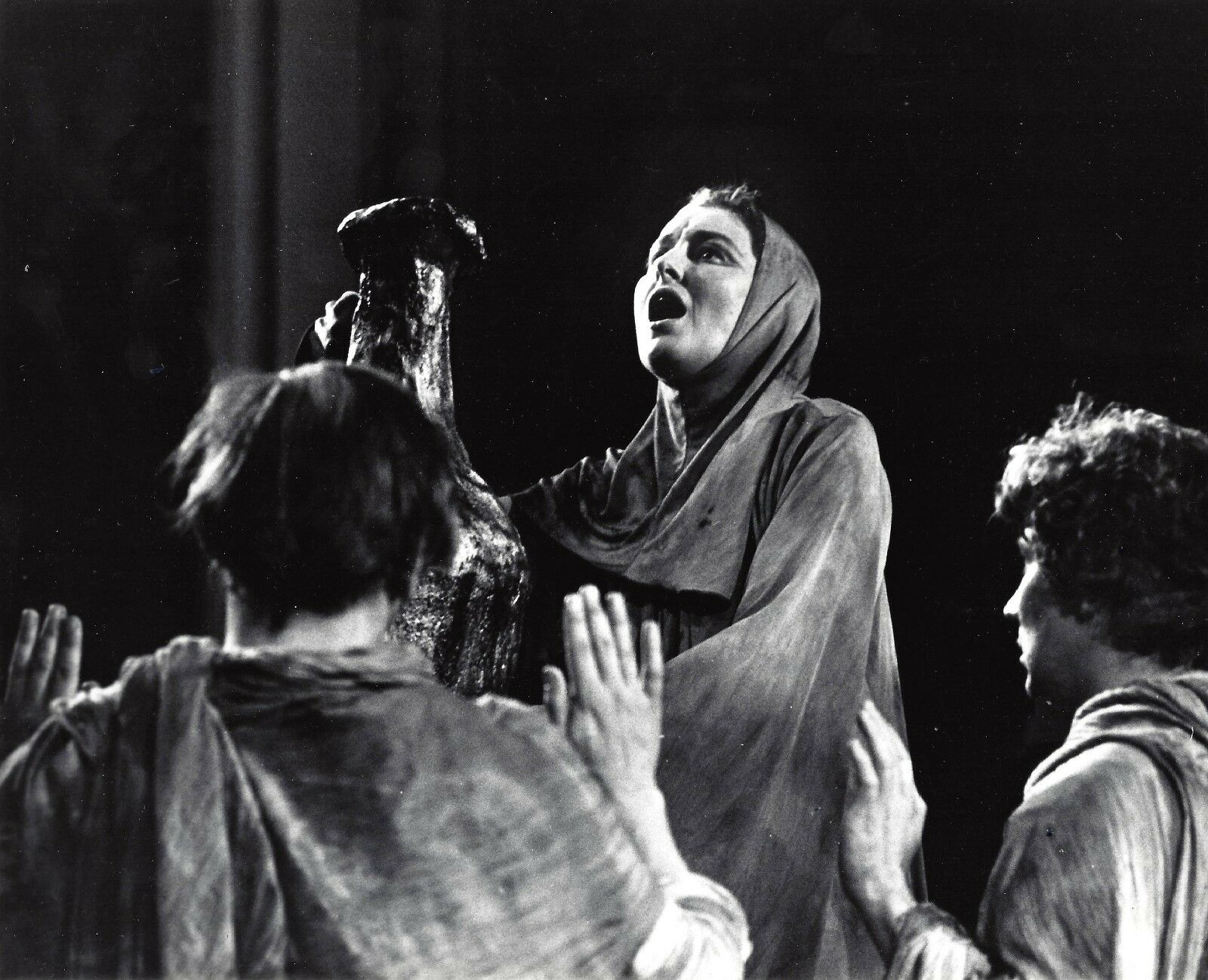
Brookes, Norris & McManus
- Joseph Hindy as Dave Burton, Mickey's father, who didn't want to walk away from his son, but couldn't stand his wife's drug addiction.
- Corey Carrier as Mickey Burton, a six year-old boy who is the target of Kelly's ire. Mickey knows he's going to die, and gives Gage a list of Christmas presents for his grandmother, including a cat, "...so she won't be alone." Mickey treasures his "Mr. Manhattan" poster and misses his father.
- Maureen Anderman as Pete O'Phelan, who was Director of Research for ten years at the Company with her husband Mark who was in "Personnel." They left and opened a restaurant-bar named Pete O'Phelan's, but their past debts caught up with them, and Mark took ill and died. McCall finds the place closed but becomes half-owner, using the restaurant to meet clients and talk strategy with his team (much like the re-imagined show uses Mel Bayani's Haven Bar as a base of operations).
- Matthew Kimbrough as Spicer, a Kelly's Bar patron who becomes fearful, and expresses concern over Kelly's escalating violence against Phyllis and Mickey.
- Dean Norris as Martin, a "silent type" Kelly's Bar patron who doesn't comment on Kelly's plan at all.
- Don McManus as Dr. Feinberg, who tells Gage about Mickey's mother and father.
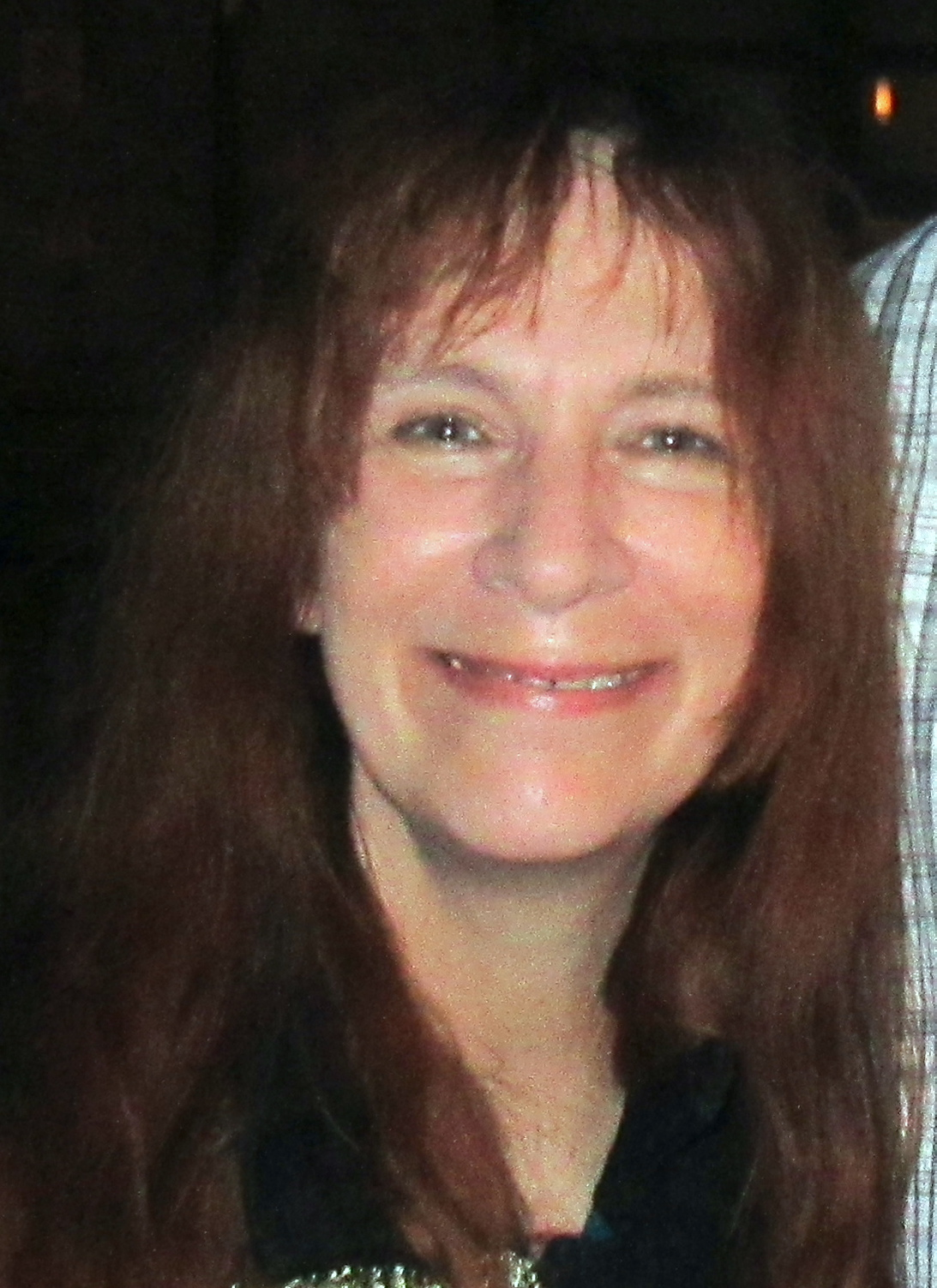
Plummer
- David Andrews as Del Larkin, an undercover cop who lies to the Organized Crime Task Force. He tries explaining to his best friend, Detective Charlie Kelly (played by co-star William Carden), that he "went in too deep" and that he's "on to something" to "bring these guys down." Kelly calls him an accomplice and tries to take Larkin in, but Kelly is inadvertently shot with his own gun in the struggle.
- George DiCenzo as Bruno Dominic, a mob boss.
- Madeleine Potter as Simone Peters, Larkin's lover, who but reports to Dominic and has another alias and profession.
- Amanda Plummer as Jill O'Connor, a police switchboard operator learning to dance in her off-hours, who accidentally overhears Larkin talking about Kelly's death, after which he threatens her life, so she calls The Equalizer.
- Marilyn McIntyre as Maureen, Kelly's widow.
- Brooke Smith as Risa, a police switchboard operator.
- Matt Mitler as Detective Bates.
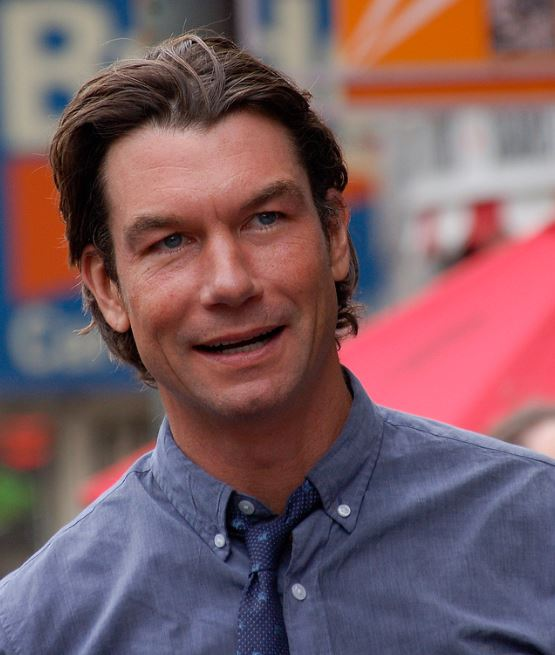
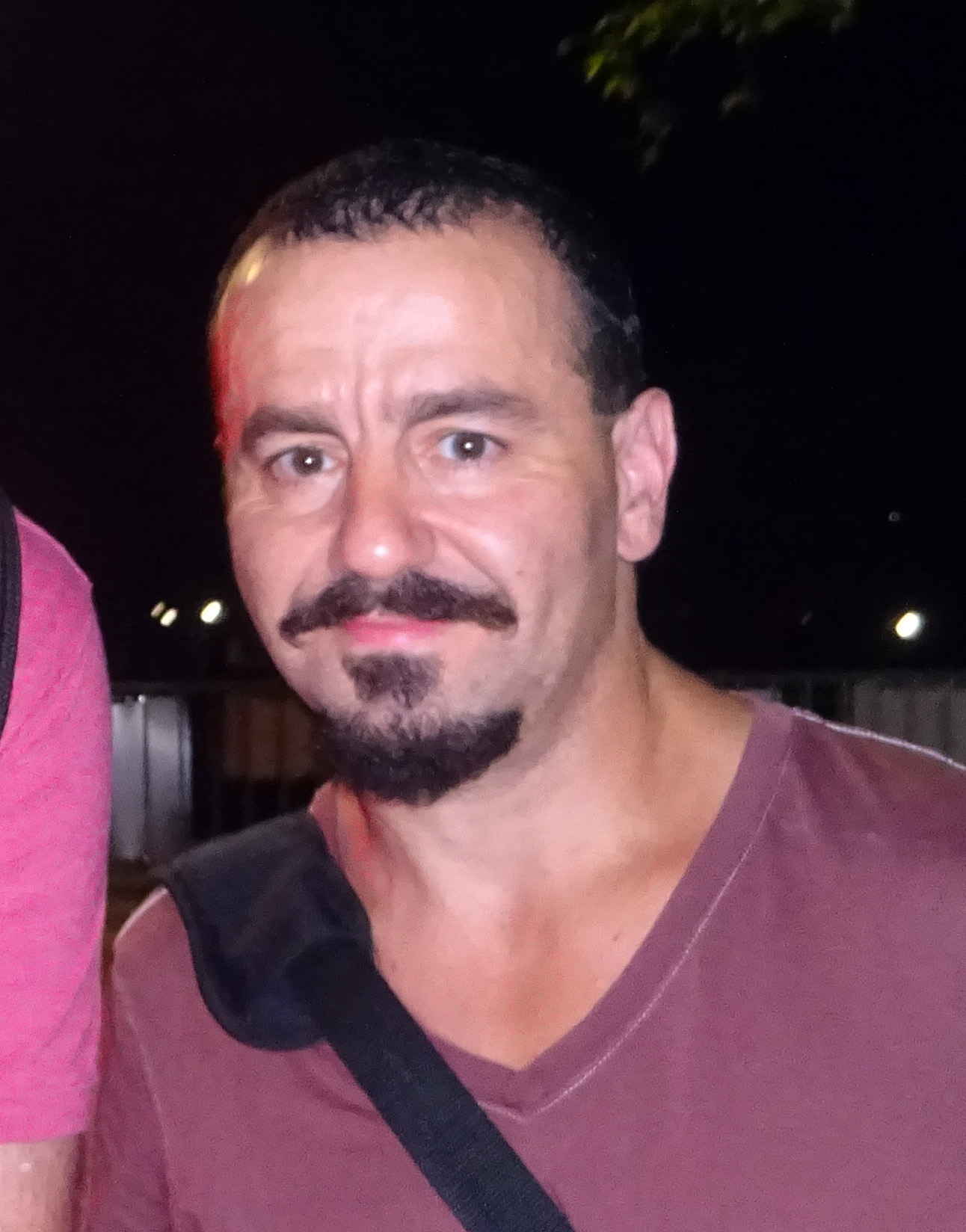
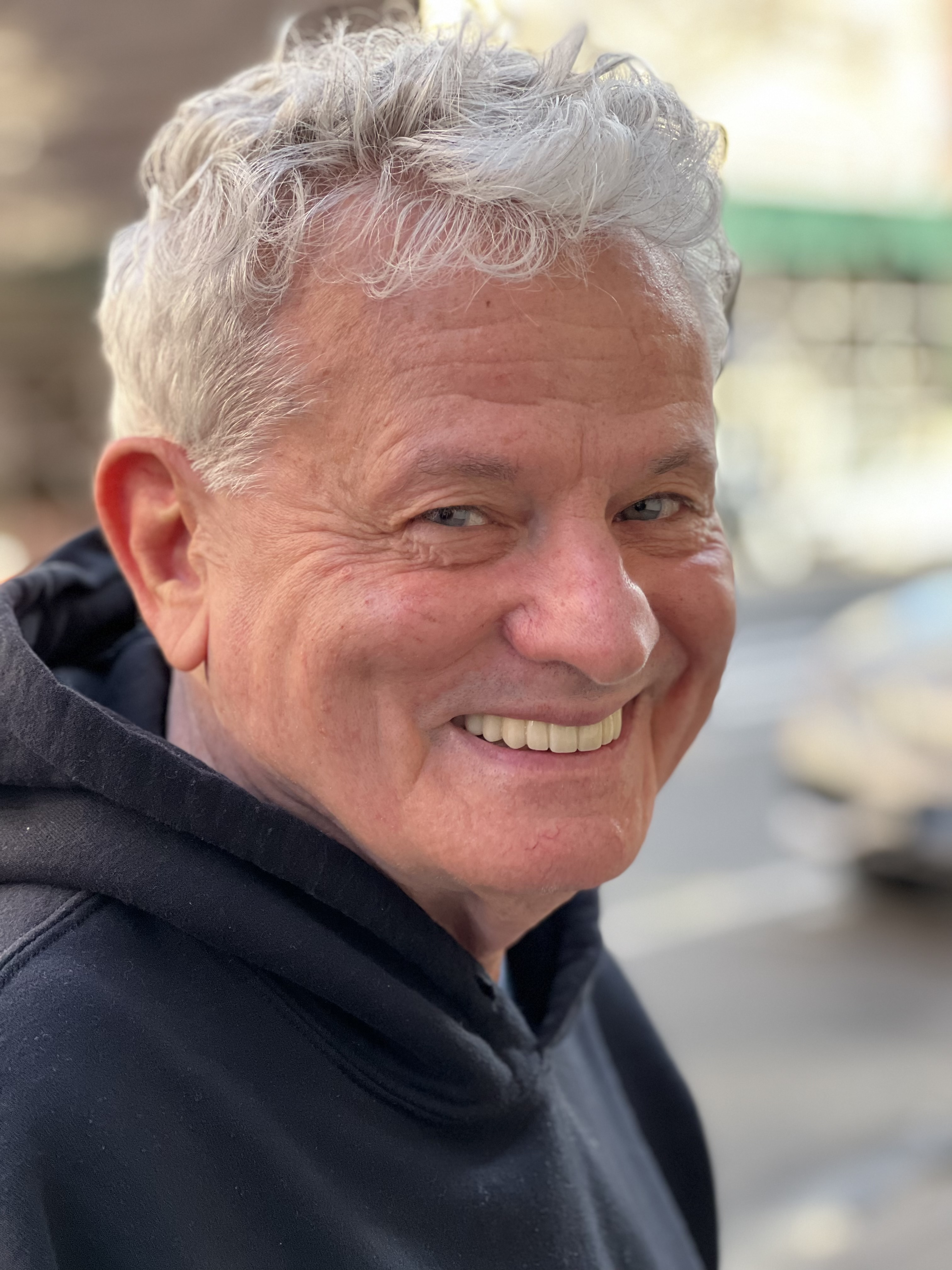
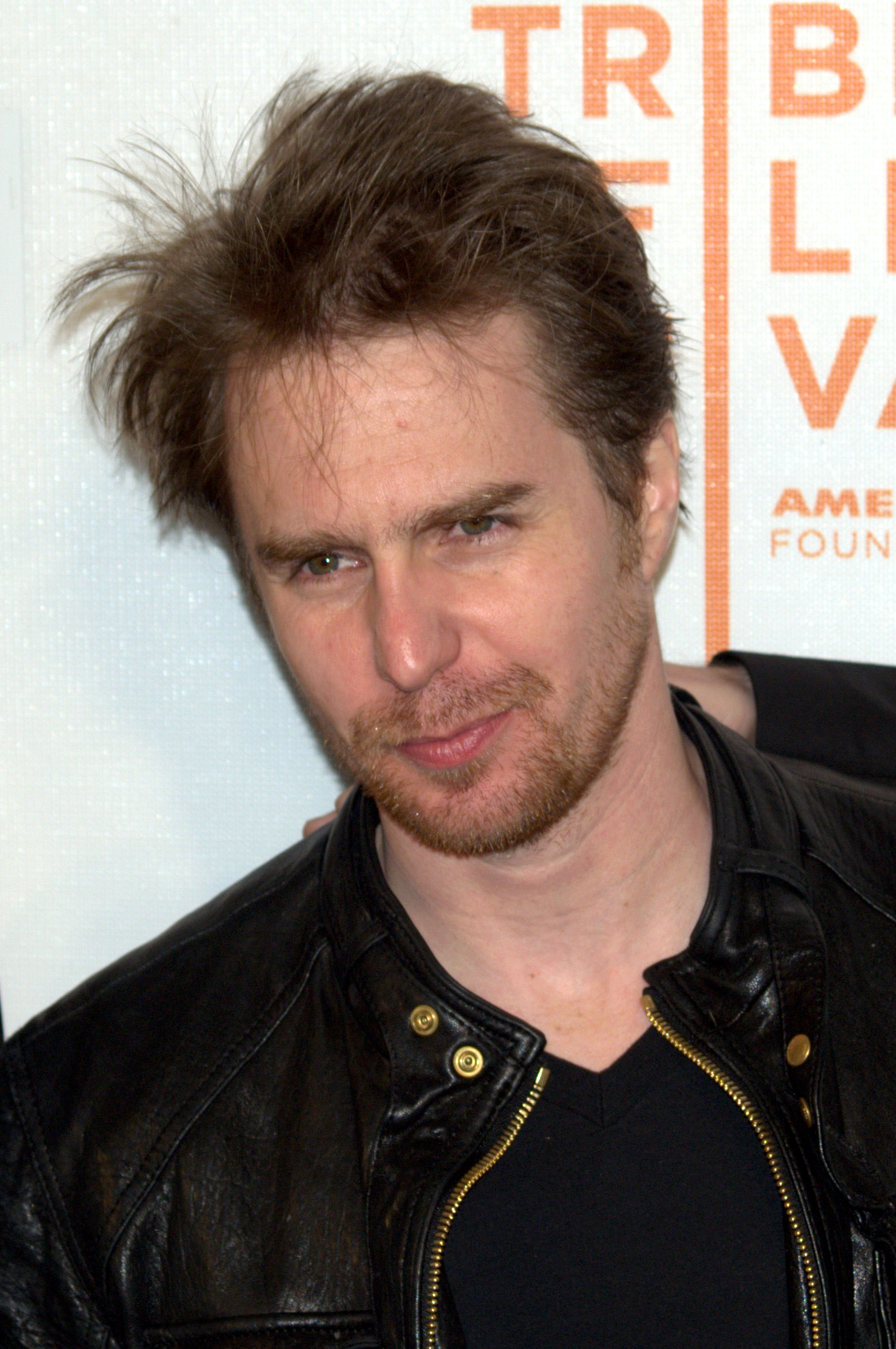
Waites – O'Connel
Rockwell – Casella
- Christopher Collet as Danny Winters, a high-school kid who gets mixed up with a bad crowd. Matters get worse when one of their own, Eddie, is hit by a car and killed while Danny and the gang chase after him.
- Thomas G. Waites as Shep Morrow, the ruthless leader of a robbery gang consisting of impressionable teenage boys who he indoctrinates with "survival of the fittest," crime "family" dogma.
- Frances Ruffelle as Sylvie, Shep's girl who reinforces his leadership and is not above using her feminine wiles to ensure loyalty, especially with the eldest, Danny.
- Lycia Naff as Amy, Danny's concerned girlfriend who notices the changes in Danny's behavior, and sees the boys with lots of money and shop-lifted goods. Not wanting to get them into trouble and arrested, she calls The Equalizer.
- Mary-Joan Negro as Irene Winters, Danny's single mother, who struggles with two jobs that prevent her from seeing what is really happening to her son. When she learns for herself that he has been stealing, and that he is willing to lie about it, she must apply some tough love.
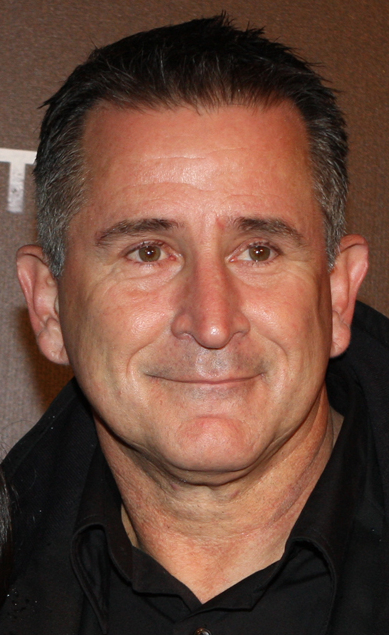
LaPaglia
- Jerry O'Connell as Bobby, one of Shep's gang members.
- Frank Whaley as Press, one of Shep's gang members.
- Sam Rockwell as Slick, one of Shep's gang members.
- Max Casella as Streak, one of Shep's gang members.
- Anthony LaPaglia as Agent #1, who with two other agents, takes Danny into custody after he chooses to ignore his mother's ultimatum. Danny knows he must extricate himself, but doesn't know how. But, McCall has a plan to end Morrow's manipulations.
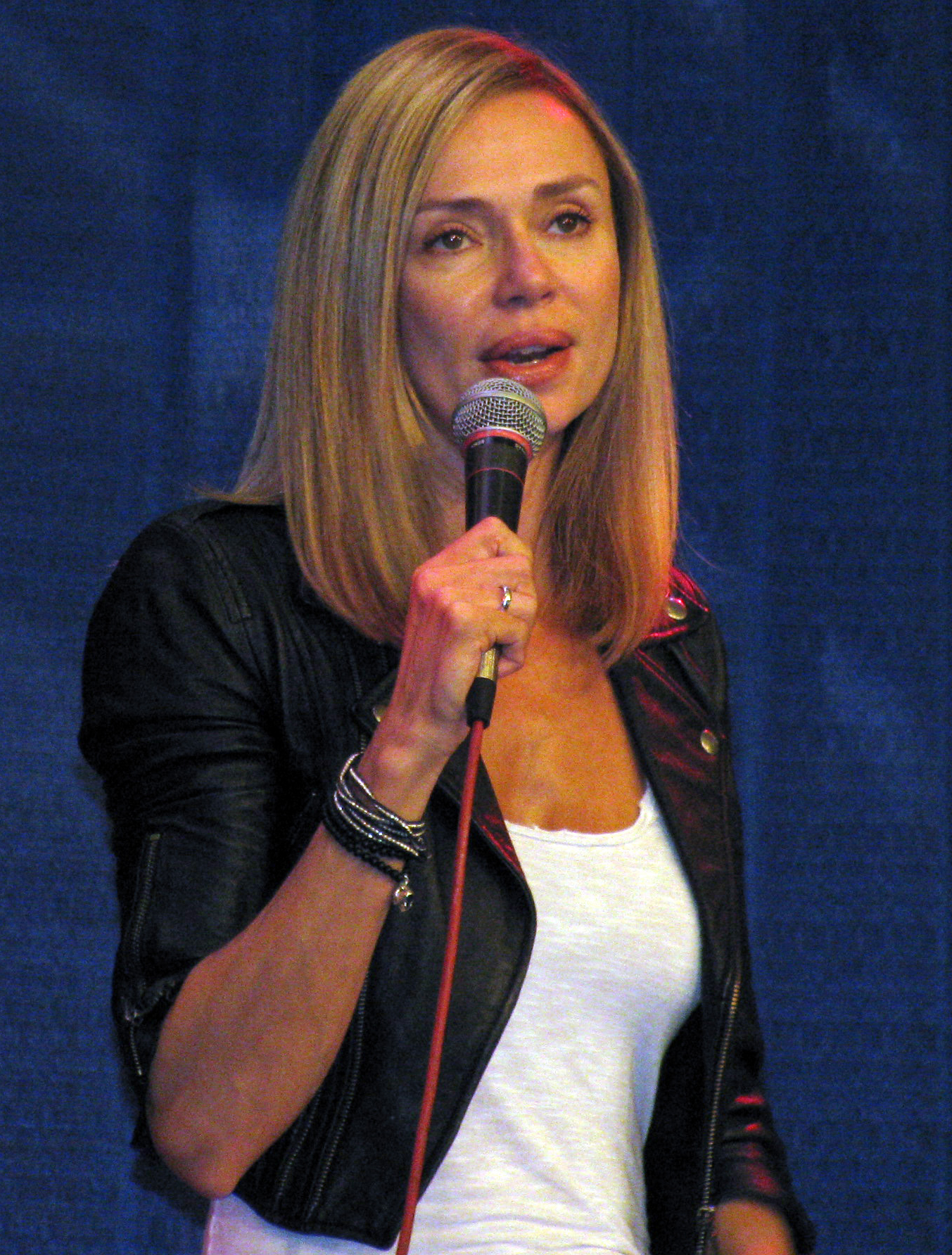
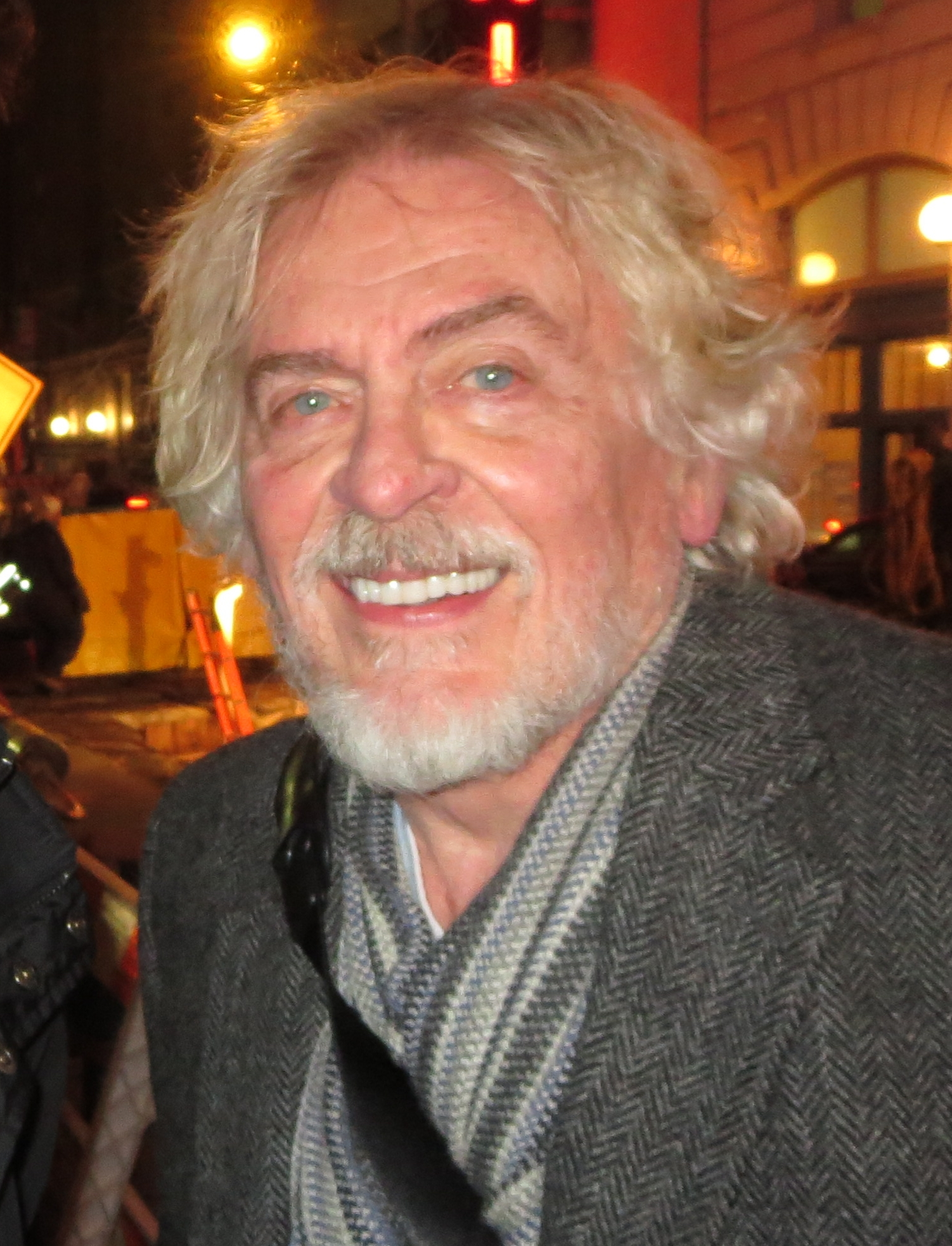
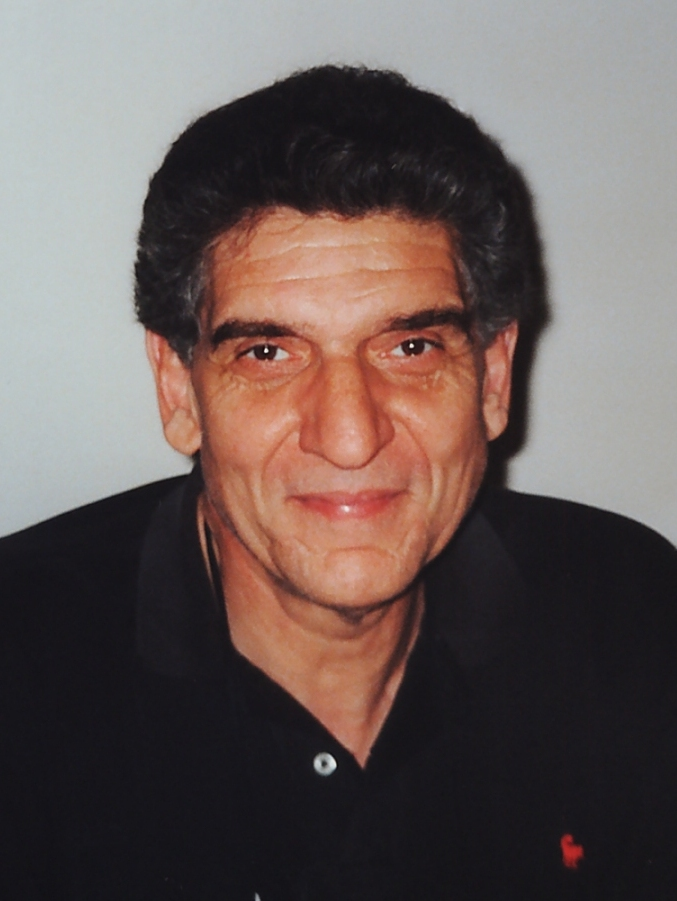
Davis – Angel
Katsulas
- Daniel Davis as Eddie Mason, an investigative reporter who has been missing for months, having gone undercover as a limo driver for beautiful "high-end" call girls, ostensibly for an exposé on prostitution, but also for revenge.
- Andreas Katsulas as Warren Briggs, who surreptitiously records sex videos to extort both his clients and his employees.
- Vanessa Angel as Christine Hayes, one of Briggs' employees who is blackmailed into prostitution.
- Maryann Urbano as Angela Mason, Eddie's concerned wife who calls The Equalizer to find her husband.
- Annabelle Gurwitch as Suzanne, another call girl blackmailed by Briggs.
- Ching Valdes-Aran as Joy Tang, a madam who is Briggs' rival in the so-called "whore wars" in which she has been losing her girls to Briggs' blackmail scheme.
- Tony Ganios as Serge, a "male talent" Briggs uses to make his blackmail sex videos.
- David B. Hunt as Steiner, Briggs' bodyguard.
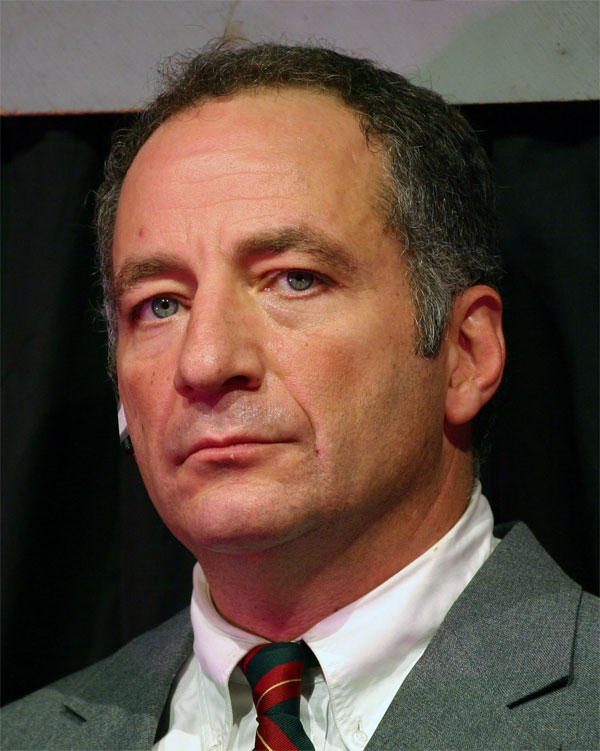
- Paul Zaloom as a Hotel Clerk.
- Colleen Flynn-Lawson as Woman on Phone, Briggs' receptionist who handles clients' calls.
- Darlene Vogel as Gina Harper, who is being blackmailed by her video into working for Briggs as another of his many call girls.
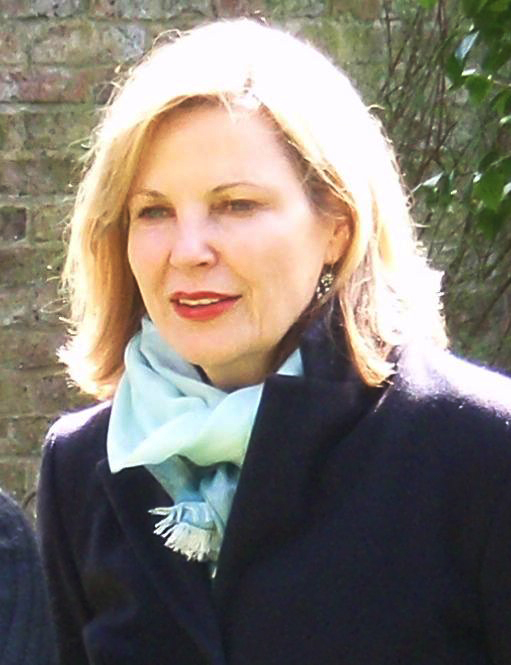
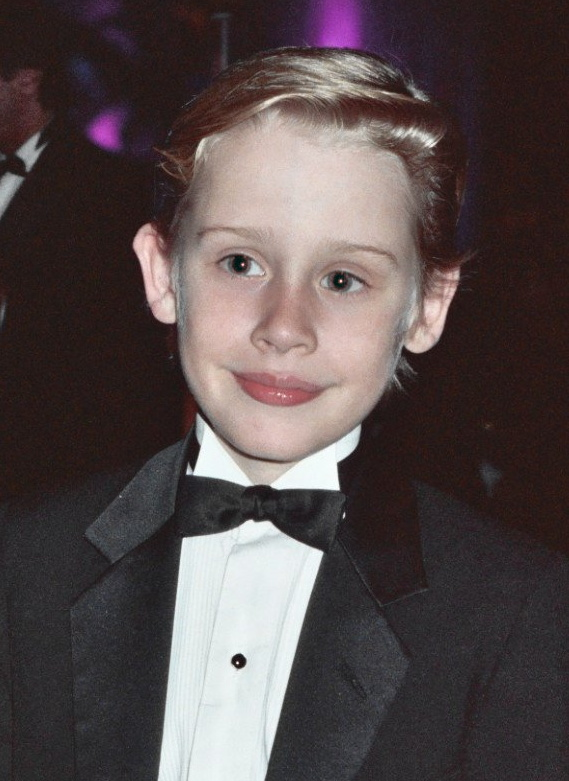
Culkin & Eichhorn
- Jon De Vries as Raymond Gephardt, a European diplomat of royal ancestry who launders money for criminals. Money and his heir, Paul, mean more to him than anything or anyone else. With diplomatic resources and $10,000,000 in loot, he can easily disappear from his ex-wife Anne and, more importantly, from mobsters.
- Lisa Eichhorn as Anne Gephardt, Raymond's ex-wife who runs her own business, thus necessitating hiring Paul's nanny, Consuela (played by Gloria Irizarry).
- Ronald Hunter as Mr. Binder, a lawyer that negotiates on behalf of the mobsters as a go-between with Raymond.
- Leon Russom as Lieutenant Borley.
- Macaulay Culkin as Paul Gephardt, who is kidnapped by his greedy father Raymond.
- Neal Ben-Ari as Stanley, who represents the mobsters trying to get their money back from Raymond.
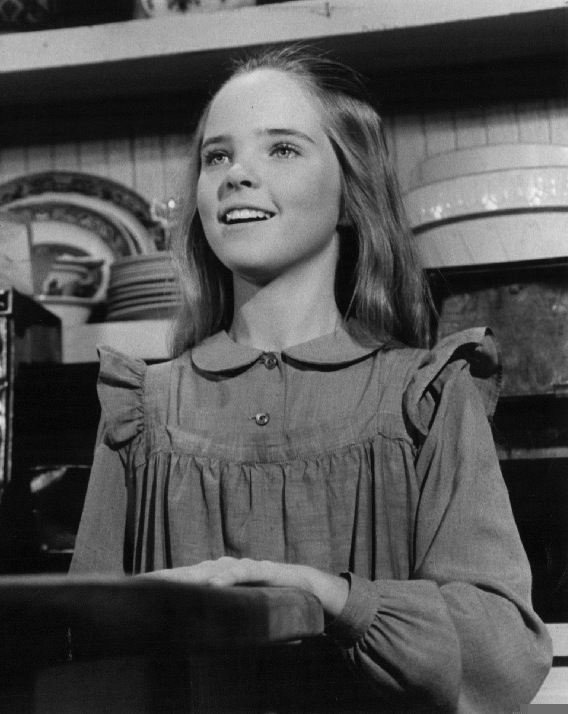
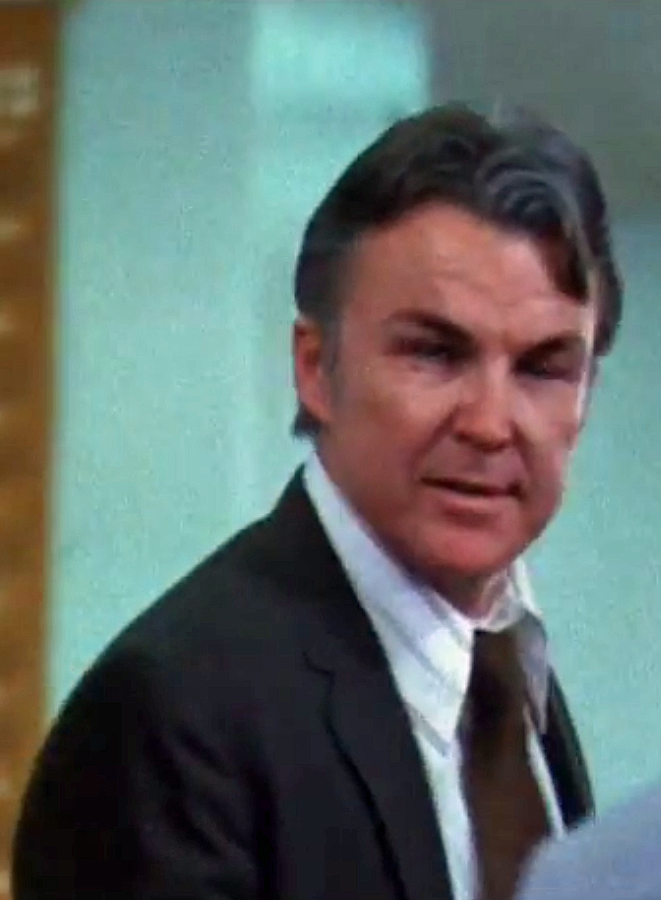
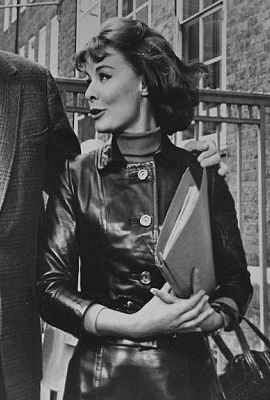
Heywood – Anderson
Zerbe
- Anne Heywood as Manon Brevard Marcel (penultimate role), who presents a "mystery" to Robert McCall, given that Manon had supposedly been killed years before in a plane crash in the French Alps while on a mission for Control. Manon had not only been a fellow Company agent, but also Robert's lover from whom she conceived Yvette, and afterwards married Phillipe Marcel.
- Melissa Sue Anderson as Yvette Marcel (reprise role after events in season two, "Memories of Manon"), who has no choice but to ask her godfather Control, and McCall, for help with her adoptive father Phillipe, who is determined to handle "The Mystery of Mannon" himself.
- Anthony Zerbe as Phillipe Marcel (reprise role after "Memories of Manon"), who is unnerved by his dead wife Manon's sudden reappearance, but he believes it's really her. It sets him against McCall and everyone else in the Company, as he blames them for her suffering.
- Roger Grimsby as a Newscaster, who announces a timber wolf named Rex Imperator on the loose in Manhattan, released from the zoo after a night watchman was assaulted.
- Lawrence Dane as Arthur Trent, an old enemy who Sterno reports was executed by firing squad in Leningrad fifteeen years ago.
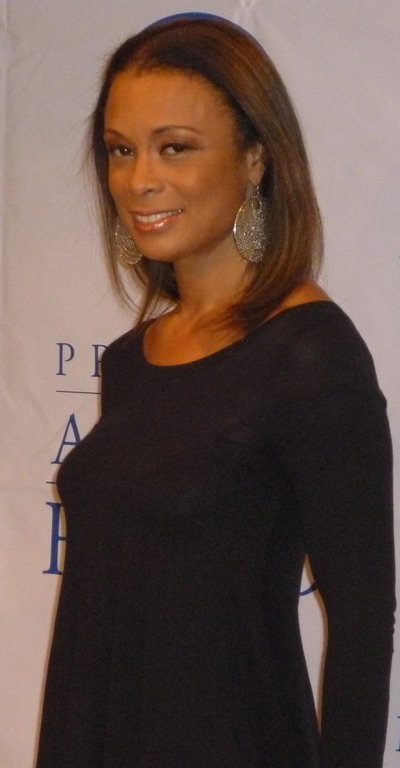
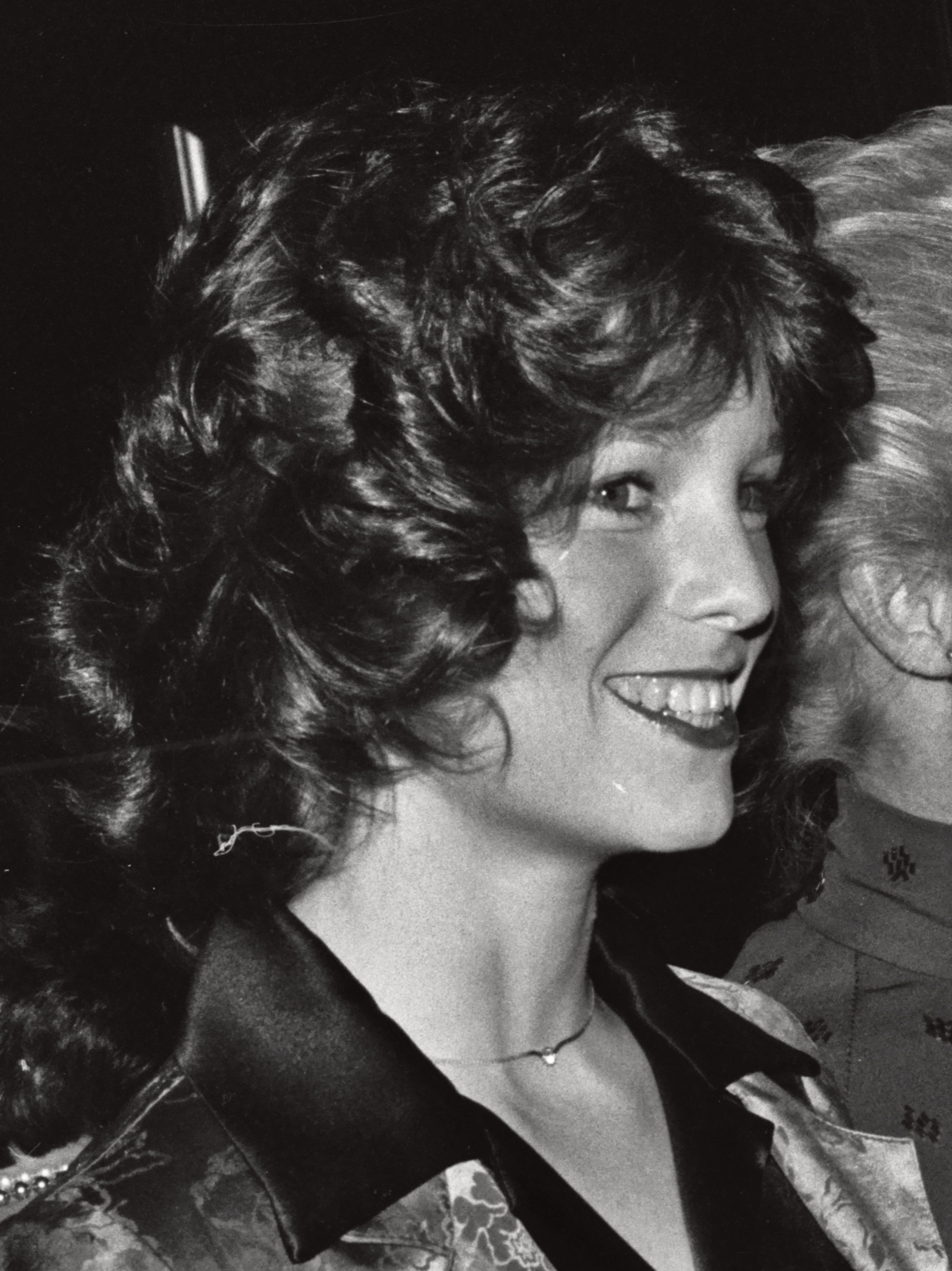
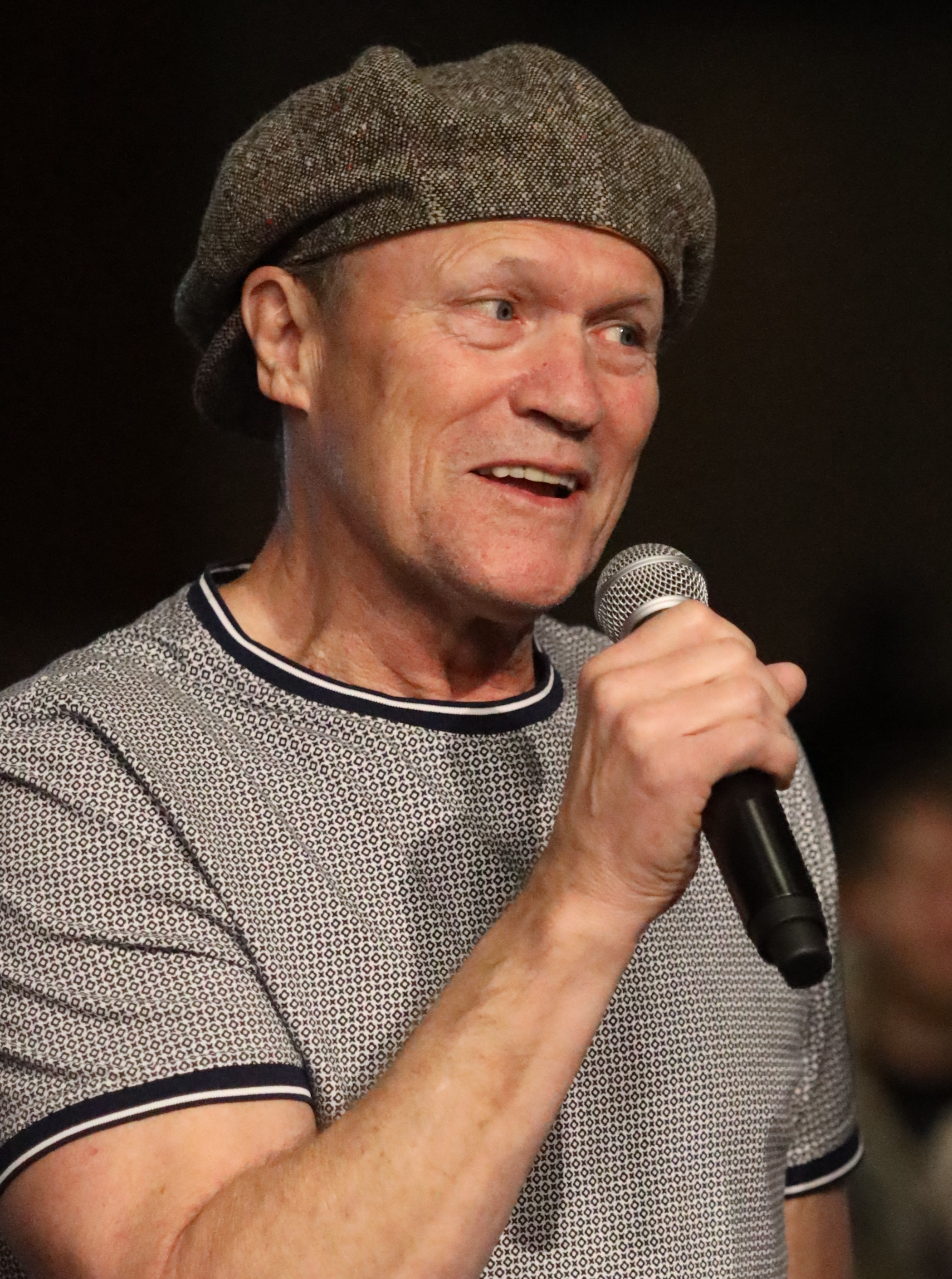
Rooker, Curtis & Pettiford
- Michael Rooker as Bill Whitaker, Paula's husband, who fell on hard times and has just been evicted, and thus forced to avail himself of the New York Department of Social Services to seek shelter elsewhere. Bill, Paula and their son Billy are sent to a deplorable, squalid hotel called The Alexandria, where a housing scam exploits the system to enrich its new "owner," Mr. Amar. It is young Billy who calls The Equalizer.
- Kelly Curtis as Paula Whitaker, Bill's husband.
- Michael Lerner as Mr. Amar, who swindled The Alexandria hotel out from under its true owner, Robert Nichols, to exploit its residents.
- Leo Burmester as Jim Harding, who tries to scam Bill by paying him $500 a month to leave the hotel so Harding can scam $3,000 more from the State to house yet another homeless family.
- Richard Bright as Vegas, who works for Amar, and has to finish the job Harding bungled.
- Ed Lauter as Robert Nichols, from whom Amar has swindled the hotel in order to run his fraudulent scheme.
- Valarie Pettiford as Jackie Chenier, an investigative reporter trying to do a documentary on "these welfare hotels," but the hotel guard blocks her entry on Amar's orders.
- Thomas A. Carlin as a Doorman.
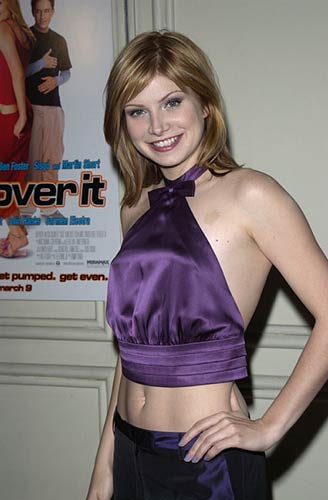
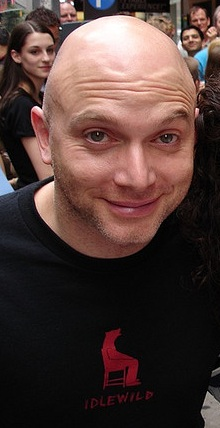
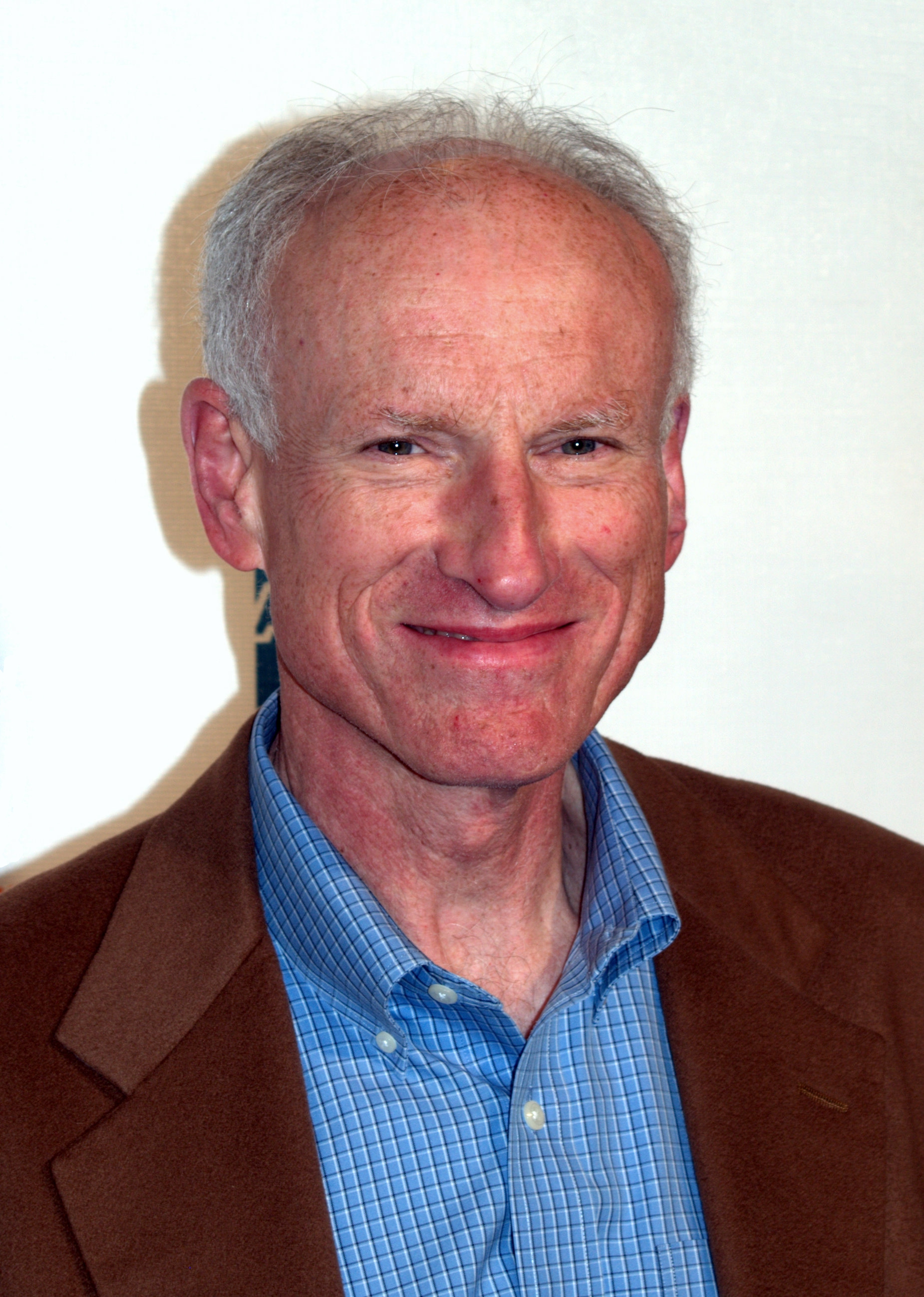
Cerveris – Vitamin C
Rebhorn
- Joe Maruzzo as Lewis Fipps, who had kidnapped seventeen year-old Andrea, demanding ransom from her rich father Vincent Brennard. When he wouldn't pay, Fipps raped, brutalized, and mutilated her. Now he runs from a hit-man hired by Brennard, taking refuge at Pete O'Phelan's bar after "Last Call."
- Michael Cerveris as Frank Fipps, a "nice guy" but compliant to a fault, allowing his brother Lewis to severely beat Mickey for getting Pete's gun from the register.
- David Schramm as Joe, a middle-aged man out with his wife Lucy at Pete O'Phelan's, who Lewis holds hostage.
- Kathleen Doyle (Note: Kathleen Doyle (1947-2021) at IMDb not to be confused with Kathleen Doyle Bates (born 1948).) as Lucy, Joe's middle-aged wife, who wants to call the police on Susan for purse-snatching.
- James Rebhorn as Gant, an international hit-man trying to fulfill Brennard's half-a-million dollar contract on Lewis' life. His professional code dissuades him entering Pete O'Phelan's and causing collateral damage, but doesn't care if Lewis kills everyone himself; it would simplify matters.
- Colleen Ann Fitzpatrick as Susan, from Bangor Maine who's on her big New York adventure, but obviously stretched beyond her means as she tries to steal Lucy's purse.
- Peter Sellars as Woody, McCall's hacker who accesses Lewis' police rap sheet: grand larceny, grand theft auto, armed robbery, kidnap, rape, and aggravated assault, with a $10,000 reward. He also provides mercenary files, including Jameson.
- Charles Keating as Vincent Brennard, an industrialist whose daughter Andrea was kidnapped by Lewis Fipps. She has subsequently undergone thirteen surgeries and been institutionalized for trauma. He hires Gant, so Fipps can't spend a few short years in prison before release.
- Tony Azito as Jameson, a mercenary who tells McCall why and for how much Gant was hired.
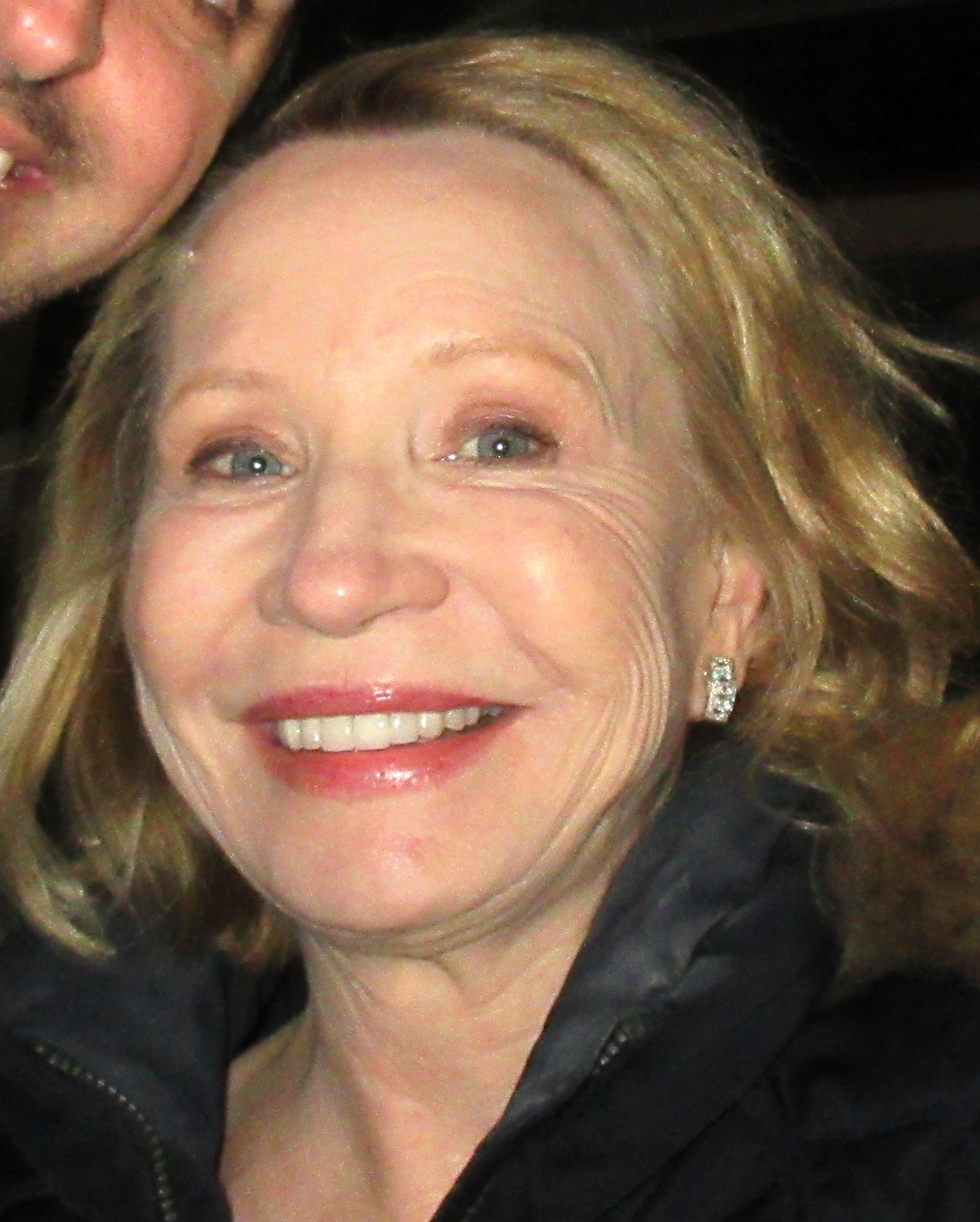
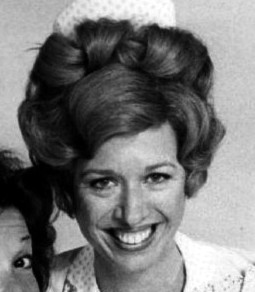
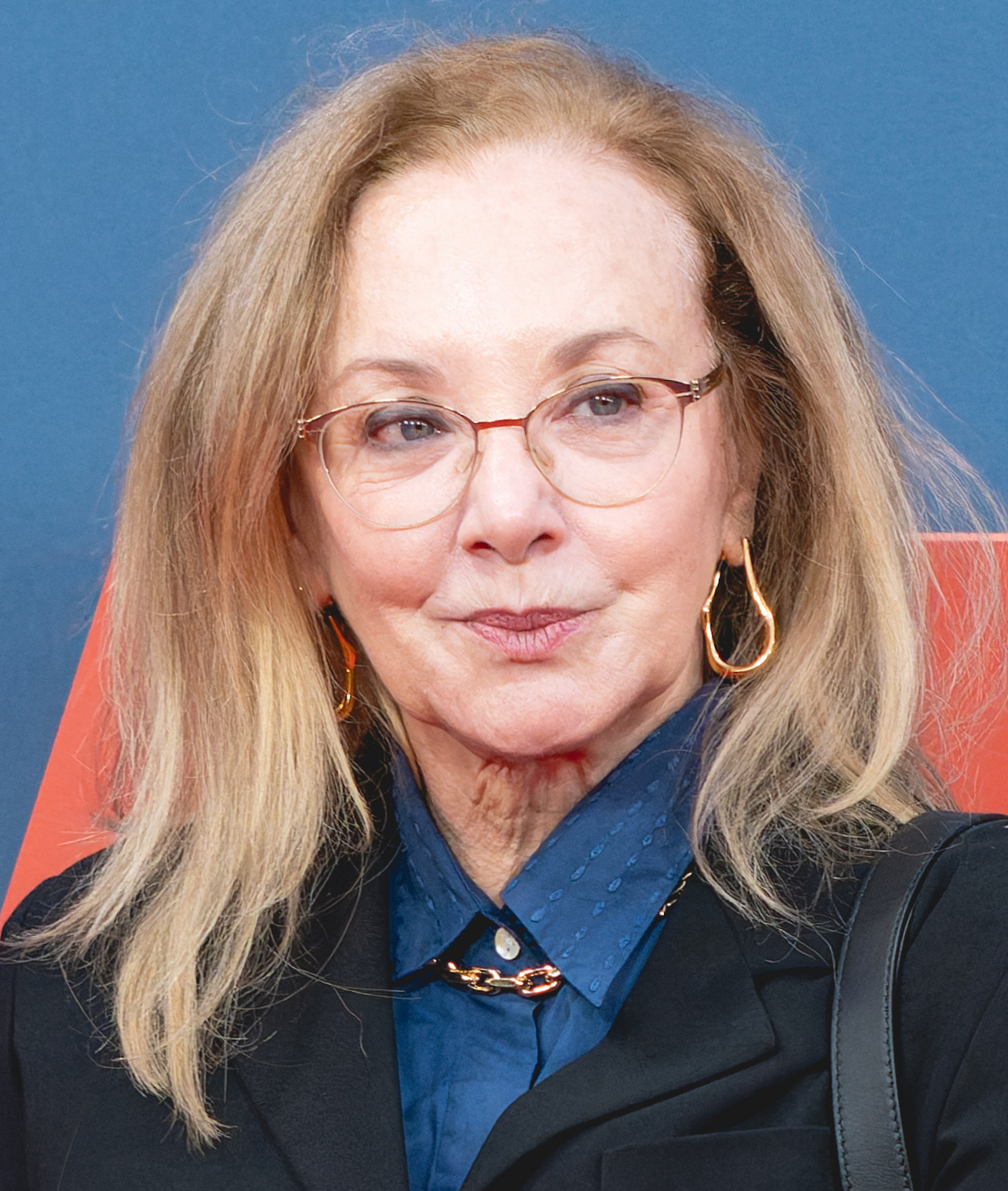
Rupp, Holliday & Smith-Cameron
- J. Smith-Cameron as Susan Foxworth, who works full-time, goes to school, and is a single mother of young Joanie. She is determined to have a life of her own despite her psychopathic, malicious, vindictive, stalker ex-husband Dr. Gary Edward Foxworth (played by guest star Philip Kraus), who hasn't been paying child support.
- Jean DeBaer as Detective Bishop, from whom Susan requests a restraining order, without evidence of a crime. She suggests Susan talk to her divorce lawyer, but Susan can't afford it. McCall must convince Bishop to act before Gary kills Susan.
- Polly Holliday as Sister Sara, who saw first-hand what a "bad-seed" Gary was as a child, and has school records to prove it.
- Tony Longo as Young, an illegal firearms dealer and thug, whom Gary hires to assault him and blame McCall, thereby justifying a restraining order against McCall.
- Debra Jo Rupp as Marge, Dr. Foxworth's assistant, who's oblivious to the television set and pre-recorded VCR tape McCall sends to Dr. Foxworth's office.
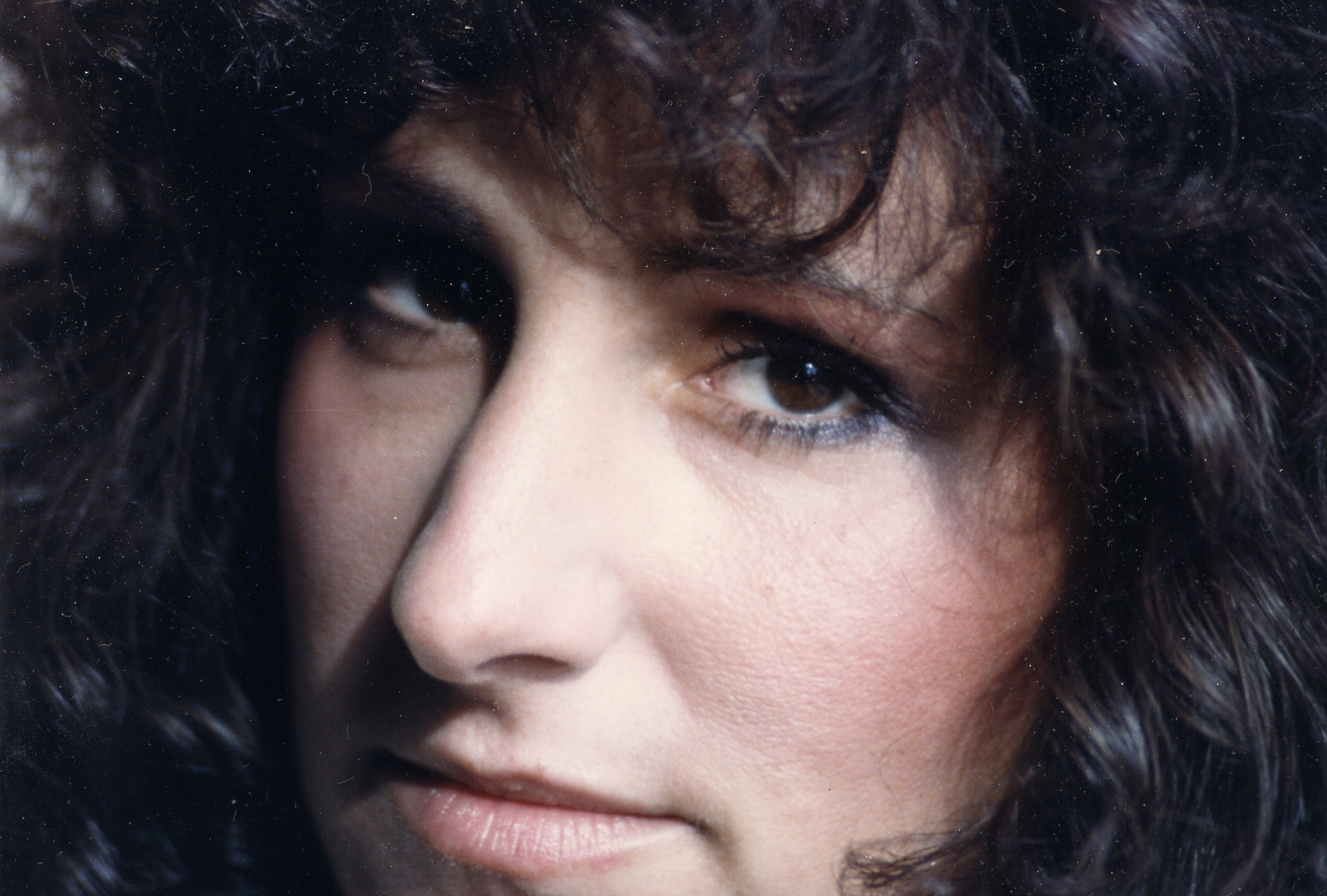
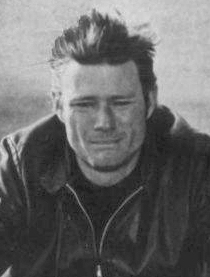
Parks & Adams
- Michael Parks as Jonathan Grey, a tanker driver for a petroleum company, who is terrorized by Hawkins, because Jonathan testified against him eight years prior.
- Verna Bloom as Marian Grey, Jonathan's wife, who is wheelchair-bound from multiple sclerosis and terrorized by Hawkins.
- Kevin Geer as Willie J. Hawkins, a petroleum company employee who killed his boss for being fired, pushing him in front of Jonathan's truck. Unable to prove pre-meditation, 25-to-life wasn't sentenced. Paroled after only eight years, he's out for revenge.
- Lenny Venito as Devin, Jonathan and Marian's son.
- Denise Faye as a Hooker, whom Hawkins sends to determine who Mickey is and why he's been hounding him.
- Cecily Adams plays Claudia, Marian's physician who treats her MS and wards off Hawkins who volunteers "to be of service to the community," but really there to terrify Marian.
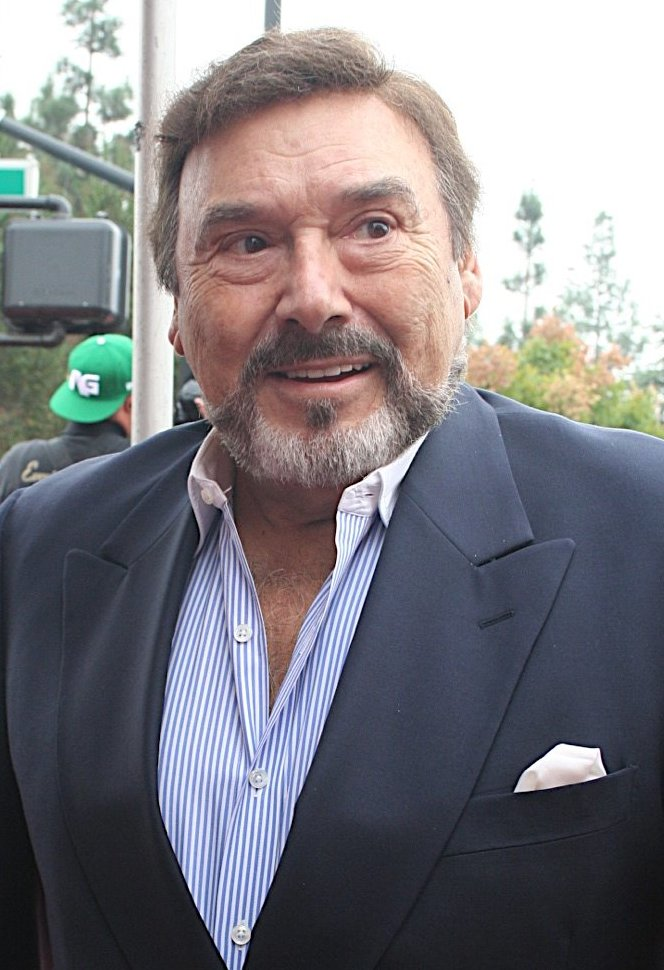
Mascolo
- Anne Twomey as Meredith Browning, a former Company protégé to whom McCall gave a memento when she ran a "travel agency" for Latin American missions, until an operation went wrong. She works illegal enterprises from Tony Costa's casino, using him for her own means.
- Joseph Mascolo as Tony Costa, who recently solved his casino income "laundry" problems, but someone steals his "going legit" money. Suspecting Meredith, he orders Johnny to get it back by any means.
- Lewis Van Bergen as Johnny Sax, Costa's second-in-command, who hides his own secrets from Costa. He tells Costa he tried everything to get the money back, but was "doing business...your business," by which he meant killing Meredith.
- Ron Frazier as Honeywell, an Agency operative who worked for Southern Control who ordered him to ensure General Astiz assumed power, which required betraying Meredith.
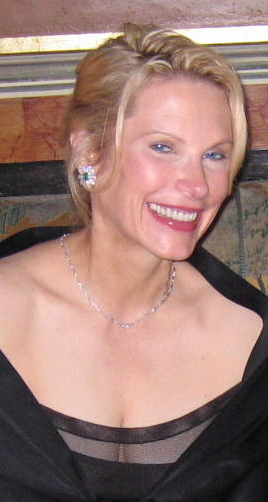
- Susan Gibney as Angela, who worked for Meredith in "customer relations," and relays what she knows to McCall and Mickey.
- Rita Jenrette as a Hooker, who propositions McCall while he reminisces about Meredith.

== Production ==
Richard Jordan was brought on to the show as fellow Company agent Harley Gage to lighten the load on Edward Woodward after he suffered a heart attack. Keith Szarabajka was featured in only four of the same episodes with Jordan.
