= Arbitrage betting =

Bets taking advantage of differing odds

Betting arbitrage ("sure bets", sports arbitrage) is an example of arbitrage arising on betting markets due to either bookmakers' differing opinions on event outcomes, or errors. When conditions allow, by placing one bet per each outcome with different betting companies, the bettor can make a profit regardless of the outcome. Mathematically, arbitrage occurs when there are a set of odds, which represent all mutually exclusive outcomes that cover all state space possibilities (i.e. all outcomes) of an event, whose implied probabilities add up to less than 1.

== Background ==
Arbitrage betting involves relatively large sums of money, given that 98% of arbitrage opportunities return less than 1.2%. The practice is usually detected quickly by bookmakers, who typically hold an unfavorable view of it, and in the past this could result in half of an arbitrage bet being canceled, or even the closure of the bettor's account. Arbitrage bettors commonly see their maximum wager limits decreased heavily when a sportsbook detects this behavior, often to the point of it no longer being viable.

== See also ==
- Advantage gambling
- Dutch book
- Mathematics of bookmaking
- Sports betting
