= Cussler =

Cussler is a surname. Notable people with the surname include:

- Clive Cussler (1931–2020), American novelist and explorer
  - Dayna Cussler, American actress, daughter of Clive
  - Dirk Cussler (born 1961), American novelist, son of Clive
- Edward Cussler (born 1940), American professor of chemical engineering
- Margaret T. Cussler (1911–1987), American professor of sociology

== See also ==
- Kessler
