= Raise the Titanic (film) =

1980 film by Jerry Jameson

- Theatrical release poster
- Directed by: Jerry Jameson
- Screenplay by: Adam Kennedy
- Adaptation by: Eric Hughes
- Based on: Raise the Titanic! by Clive Cussler
- Produced by: William Frye; Lord Grade
- Starring: Jason Robards; Richard Jordan; David Selby; Anne Archer; Alec Guinness
- Cinematography: Matthew F. Leonetti
- Edited by: Robert F. Shugrue; J. Terry Williams
- Music by: John Barry
- Production company: ITC Entertainment
- Distributed by: Associated Film Distribution (North America); ITC Film Distributors Limited (United Kingdom)
- Release dates: 30 July 1980 (Premiere); 1 August 1980
- Running time: 114 minutes
- Countries: United Kingdom; United States
- Language: English
- Budget: $35 million
- Box office: $7 million

Raise the Titanic is a 1980 adventure film produced by Lew Grade's ITC Entertainment and directed by Jerry Jameson. The film, written by Eric Hughes (adaptation) and Adam Kennedy (screenplay), is based on the 1976 book of the same name by Clive Cussler. The storyline concerns a plan to recover the RMS Titanic to obtain cargo valuable to Cold War hegemony.

The film stars Jason Robards, Richard Jordan, David Selby, Anne Archer, and Alec Guinness. It received mixed reviews by critics and audiences and proved to be a box-office bomb, grossing about $7 million against an estimated $35 million budget. Producer Lew Grade later remarked that "it would be cheaper to lower the Atlantic".

== Plot ==
In the wilds of Northern Siberia during the Cold War, an American spy breaks into an old, snow-covered mine, where he discovers the frozen body of a U.S. Army sergeant next to a wooden marker dated 10 February 1912. Using a Geiger counter, the spy discovers that byzanium, a fictional highly-radioactive mineral that could be used in nuclear warfare, was mined there. The spy is quickly discovered and chased out of the mine by a Soviet soldier, who shoots him in pursuit. The Soviet soldier is then shot and killed by adventurer and government operative Dirk Pitt, who rescues the spy and takes him back to Washington, D.C.

The C.I.A. discovers that the mine was operated by Americans and that the raw byzanium ore found there was to be sent back to the United States. The byzanium was packaged into wooden shipping boxes by an American named Brewster and loaded on board the Titanic, which sank on its maiden voyage on 15 April 1912. Pitt travels to speak with John Bigalow, a deckhand on the Titanic who was the last person to see Brewster alive. Bigalow claims that he locked Brewster in the vault containing the shipping boxes minutes before the ship sank and that his last words were "Thank God for Southby!" When Pitt returns, he proposes a salvage mission to locate the wreck of the Titanic and raise it out of the ocean so they can find the byzanium before the Soviets can. Pitt and Admiral James Sandecker propose the plan to the president, who agrees and puts Pitt in charge of the operation.

Soviet diplomat Andre Prevlov discovers the plan and leaks the story to the press, forcing Sandecker to hold a press conference about why the Titanic is being raised. Reporters ask him questions about byzanium, but he refuses to answer. Meanwhile, Navy vessels search the ocean floor in the North Atlantic to locate the sunken ocean liner. During the search, one of the submersibles, Starfish, experiences a cabin flood and implodes. Once the wreckage is found, salvage experts begin the dangerous job of raising the Titanic. Another submersible, Deep Quest, experiences a battery shortage, which causes its manipulator arm to become locked onto the Titanic's wreckage.

Eventually, the rusting Titanic is brought to the surface using multiple compressed air tanks and buoyancy aids. The passenger liner is then towed to a dry dock in New York, its original destination. It turns out no expense is being spared because the rare mineral will be used as the power source in a proposed weapons system that could take down any missile entering US airspace. In response, Prevlov challenges the United States over the salvage of Titanic because they claim the mineral was taken illegally from the Soviet Union. On entering the watertight vault, the salvage team discover Brewster's mummified remains, but no mineral. The boxes are just full of gravel. It soon becomes evident that a clue was left in Brewster's final words. He had arranged a fake burial in a graveyard in Southby, England, prior to sailing back to the United States on the ill-fated ocean liner.

Some time later, both Pitt and Seagram visit the grave and confirm the mineral is indeed buried there. They decide to leave it buried because knowledge of its existence would destabilise the status quo that maintains the peace between the West and the Soviet Union.

== Cast ==
- Jason Robards as Admiral James Sandecker
- Richard Jordan as Dirk Pitt
- David Selby as Gene Seagram
- Anne Archer as Dana Archibald
- Alec Guinness as John Bigalow
- Bo Brundin as Captain Andre Prevlov
- M. Emmet Walsh as Master Chief Vinnie Walker
- J.D. Cannon as Captain Joe Burke
- Norman Bartold as Admiral Kemper
- Elya Baskin as Marganin
- Dirk Blocker as Merker
- Michael Ensign as Lieutenant Northacker
- Robert Broyles as Willis
- Harvey Lewis as Kiel
- Paul Carr as CIA Director Nicholson
- Michael C. Gwynne as Bohannon
- Nancy Nevinson as Sarah Martindale
- Mark L. Taylor as Spence
- Clive Cussler as Bearded Reporter
- Maureen McGinnis as Party Guest in Red Jacket

== Production ==
The novel Raise the Titanic! by Clive Cussler was published in 1976. In August of that year, producer Robert Shaftel reportedly had the film rights, but in the following month, it was clarified that the film rights had not yet been offered.

=== Development ===
Lew Grade said he read the novel by Clive Cussler and became interested, thinking there was potential for a series along the lines of the James Bond films. (Note: However, there was a later version of Clive Cussler/Dirk Pitt novel as a film, which was Sahara (2005) He discovered that Stanley Kramer was interested in directing, and Grade said he would buy the rights to the book and let Kramer direct and produce. Kramer was making The Domino Principle for Grade. In October 1976, Grade had the film rights for a reported $450,000.

The book came out in late 1976 and was a best seller. In the summer of 1976, Kramer filmed footage from a Bicentennial Ball which he hoped to use in the movie.

In January 1977, Kramer signed contracts to direct the film and for the film to be produced by Marvin Starger. In March, Grade said he had optioned the rights for two other Dirk Pitt novels, Iceberg and The Sea Dweller.

At the Cannes Film Festival in May 1977, Lew Grade revealed the film as part of a slate of projects which included The Boys from Brazil, The Golden Gate (from a novel by Alistair MacLean directed by Jerry Jameson), and $1.97 about the early years of Charles Bronson.

Work soon began and models of the ship were built; Grade said that the models were at least two or three times larger than they should be. The models were based on blueprints of the actual Titanic and were built at CBS Studio Center in Studio City at a cost of $5–6 million.

Eventually, in December 1977, Lew Grade said that Kramer had left the project due to creative differences. Kramer explained, "The factors were casting and the number of miniatures we planned to use. You might say one of the possibilities as to why I left was that I felt things might have cost more. It's always a little sad to see it happen this way. Raise the Titanic was a big challenge – all the excitement of special effects, underwater filming". Kramer said the producers wanted the movie made for $9 million but he felt it would cost $14 million. Kramer was paid off with a fee of $500,000.

=== Pre-production ===
In May 1978, Jerry Jameson was picked up as a director; he had been attached to The Golden Gate, which had not been made. Grade said the movie would be his most expensive yet, costing $20 million, but would not feature any major stars, as he commented that "the ship is the star. Anyway the money that would normally go to actors has been spent on our models. They're magnificent". The models cost $5 million. William Frye, who produced Jameson's Airport '77, was hired to produce.

Production costs spiraled to US$15 million as work was undertaken to find a ship that could be converted to look like the sunken Titanic.

It was felt that the real Titanic, if raised from the bottom of the ocean, would come up rather gradually at a gentle angle, before levelling off on the surface. The tank in North Hollywood was too shallow and would launch the model like a rocket ship. It was decided to film in a bigger tank.

In December 1978 construction began on a water tank in Malta to film the underwater scenes. Grade said that "Malta was the only place we could find an existing tank with the right location and the right surroundings".

A double for the Titanic was found in Athens.

=== Writing ===
The screenplay also underwent numerous rewrites. The first writer to work on it was Adam Kennedy, who wrote the script for Stanley Kramer's film for Lew Grade, The Domino Principle. He was followed by Eric Hughes, Millard Kaufman and Arnold Schulman. Kennedy was brought back to do further revisions on the script and he received sole credit.

Novelist Larry McMurtry – who disliked Cussler's novel, considering it "less a novel than a manual on how to raise a very large boat from deep beneath the sea" – claims that he was one of approximately 17 writers who worked on the screenplay and the only one not to petition for a credit on the finished film.

Admiral David Cooney, Chief of Information for the Navy, demanded the script be rewritten so as the Russians did not come off smarter than the Americans.

=== Casting ===
Elliott Gould was offered a lead role, but turned it down, quipping: "I don't want to raise the Titanic. Let the Titanic stay where it is". Jason Robards said he did the film for "money, m'dear, money... We're all incidental to the hardware and the special effects on this one". In October 1979, Richard Jordan was cast as Dirk Pitt. Clive Cussler made a cameo in the film as a reporter at the script conference.

=== Filming ===
Filming started in October 1979 at CBS Studio Center. By this stage $15 million had already been spent on the tank and models.

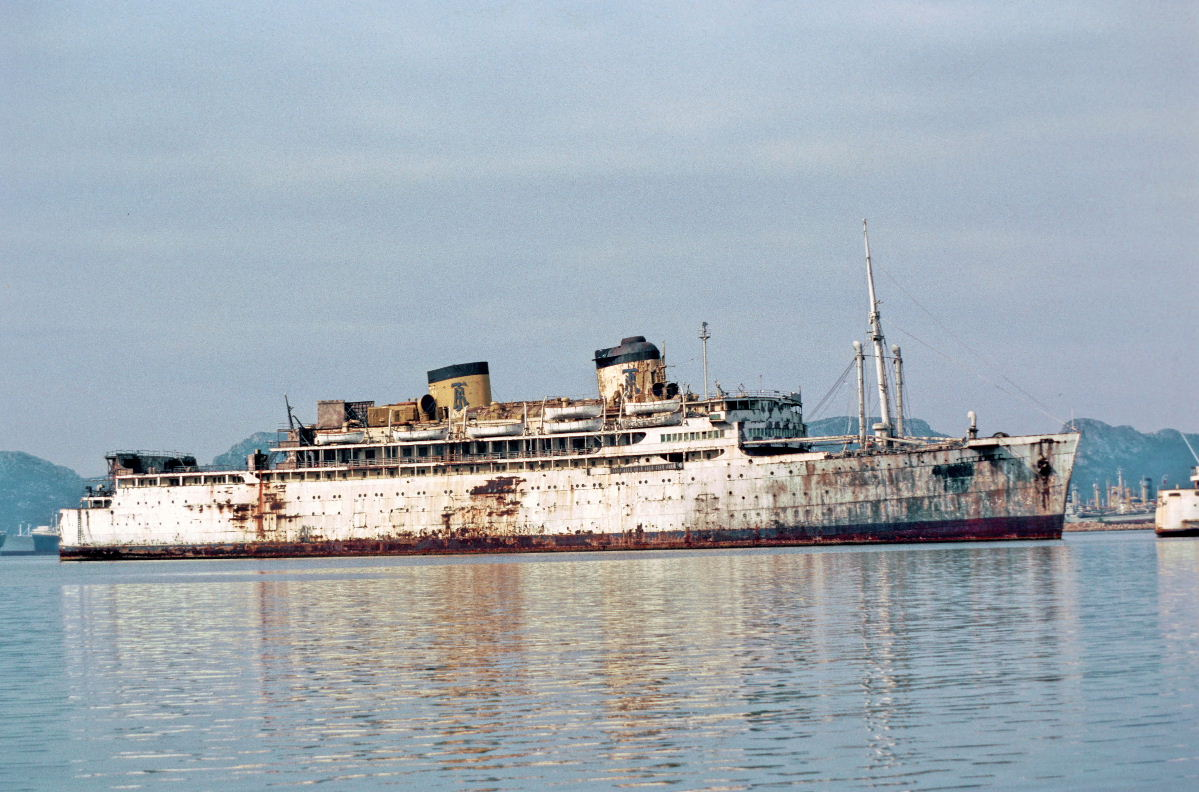
SS Athinai laid up in 1986. The ship's poor condition was used to emulate the wreck of Titanic for close-up shots.

An old Greek ocean liner, SS Athinai was converted into a replica of the Titanic. A scale model was used for close-up underwater scenes. At the time of filming there were conflicting views as to whether the Titanic had broken up as she foundered based on the original eyewitness testimony of the survivors, and – in line with the novel's assumption against the break-up narrative – the ship was portrayed as intact in the film. In 1985, the wreck of the real Titanic was located, confirming that she had broken up during the disaster, and lay in two pieces on the bottom of the North Atlantic in a state of advanced corrosion.

A 10-tonne 50 ft (15 m) scale model was also built for the scene where the Titanic is raised to the surface. Costing $7 million, the model initially proved too large for any existing water tank. Following the completion of filming, the scale model was left to rot for 30 years at the side of the horizon tank (at 35°53′36.36″N 14°32′4.41″E). In January 2003, it was damaged by a storm. Eventually, the badly corroded model was moved to a new location within the studios, located at 35.893879°N 14.53475°E.

The final scene involved Alec Guinness at St Ives, Cornwall over two days. The day before the shoot St Ives had its worst storm in one hundred years, destroying the church where the scene was to be shot so it had to be relocated. Second unit filming took place in San Diego, California, and involved the official cooperation of the U.S. Navy. The amphibious transport dock USS Denver (LPD-9), the tank landing ship USS Schenectady (LST-1185), and destroyer USS Carpenter (DD-825) participated in the filming off the shores of San Diego and were referenced by name in the film. In March 1980, Marble Arch auctioned off props for the film among others.

== Music ==
John Barry created the film's musical score, which became the most acclaimed aspect of the production and is considered by many to be one of the very best of Barry's career – closely following the style of his soundtrack for the James Bond film Moonraker the preceding year, with militaristic passages reflecting the Cold War aspects of the plot to the dark, cold, brooding compositions reflected in the underwater scenes.

Though the original recordings of the music have been lost, Silva Screen Records, along with Nic Raine, one of Barry's orchestrators, commissioned a re-recording in 1999 of the complete score with the City of Prague Philharmonic Orchestra.

In August 2014 Network On Air were to release Raise The Titanic on Blu-ray in the UK, with the only known available original Barry score. There are tapes from M&E which contain the score plus sound effects. There is no known source for the original, complete score.

== Release ==
The film was released by a new distribution company, AFD.

The film had its world premiere in Boston on 30 July 1980. It opened in 90 US locations 2 days later on 1 August. Twelve minutes were cut after the premiere.

== Reception ==
Raise the Titanic received mixed reviews and has a 38% on Rotten Tomatoes from eight reviews.

Cussler was so disgusted with the film that he refused to give any permission for further film adaptations of his books. In 2006, Cussler sued the filmmakers of Sahara, a film adaption of his 1992 book, for failing to consult him on the script when it also made huge financial losses.

The film grossed $7 million against a budget of $35 million. It grossed $1,615,000 in its opening weekend from 167 theatres.

Lew Grade later wrote that he "thought the movie was quite good", particularly the actual raising of the Titanic and the scene where Dirk Pitt walks into the wrecked ballroom. He blamed the failure of the film in part on the release of a TV movie on the topic, S.O.S. Titanic (released theatrically through EMI Films, of which Grade's brother, Lord Delfont, was then chairman). Grade was quoted years later as saying "It would have been cheaper to lower the Atlantic."

Raise the Titanic, along with other contemporary flops, has been credited with prompting Grade's withdrawal from continued involvement with the film industry.
