= Brushfire (disambiguation) =

A brushfire or brush fire is a type of wildfire.

Brushfire may also refer to:

- Brushfire (film), a 1962 jungle warfare film
- Brushfire: Illuminations from the Inferno, a sequel to the art book Barlowe's Inferno

== See also ==
- Brushfire Records, a record label
- Brushfire Fairytales, an album by Jack Johnson
- Low-intensity conflict
