= Howard Caine =

American character actor (1926–1993)

- Caine in 1978
- Born: Howard Elmer Cohen; January 2, 1926; Nashville, Tennessee, U.S.
- Died: December 28, 1993 (aged 67); North Hollywood, California, U.S.
- Resting place: Eden Memorial Park Cemetery
- Occupations: Film and television actor
- Years active: 1953–1988
- Spouse: Valerie Elson (m. 1991)

Howard Caine (born Howard Elmer Cohen; January 2, 1926 – December 28, 1993) was an American character actor, probably best known as Gestapo Major Wolfgang Hochstetter in the television series Hogan's Heroes (1965–71). He also played Lewis Morris of New York in the musical film 1776 and Everett Scovill, a thinly disguised portrait of Charles Manson's attorney Irving Kanarek, in the television movie Helter Skelter. He was a member of the Academy of Motion Picture Arts and Sciences.

== Early life ==
Howard Elmer Cohen was born on January 2, 1926, in Nashville, Tennessee, into a Jewish family. At the age of 13, Cohen moved with his family to New York City, where he began studying acting. He served in the United States Navy during World War II, from 1944 to 1946, fighting the Japanese in the Pacific Theatre. After the war, Caine studied drama at Columbia University, where he graduated summa cum laude.

== Career ==
Caine appeared on Broadway in Wonderful Town, Inherit the Wind, Lunatics and Lovers, and Tiger at the Gates. He succeeded Ray Walston as "Mr. Applegate" in the original production of Damn Yankees.

He was featured in such films as From the Terrace (1960), Pay or Die (1960), as the husband of the character portrayed by Judy Garland in Judgment at Nuremberg (1961), Brushfire (1962), The Man from the Diner's Club (1963), Pressure Point (1962), and Alvarez Kelly (1966). He co-starred with Godfrey Cambridge and Estelle Parsons in Watermelon Man (1970). Caine appeared in more than 750 live and filmed television programs, including the western series The Californians, Two Faces West, and The Travels of Jaimie McPheeters.

He is best remembered for his recurring role (37 episodes) as Major Wolfgang Hochstetter on the popular 1960s sitcom Hogan's Heroes (1965–1971). Prior to that he appeared on that show in two other roles, in the season one episode "Happy Birthday, Adolf" and the season two episode "The Battle of Stalag 13".

From his early childhood in Tennessee, Caine had always been fascinated with the Appalachian five-string bluegrass banjo and began mastering it in the mid-1960s. From the summer of 1970 until his death in 1993, he took trophies at 29 prominent banjo and fiddle contests in the southland for both Best Traditional Banjo and Traditional Singing. He was also a popular folk singer and appeared at a number of prominent folk clubs and folk festivals.

== Death ==
Caine died of a heart attack on December 28, 1993, five days short of his 68th birthday.

== Roles ==
- 1982-...: Member of the national board of the Screen Actors Guild

== Partial credits ==
Year	Title	Role	Genre	Notes
1953	Marty	Bartender	TV play	
1957	The Californians	Schaab	TV series	8 episodes, 1957–1958
1959	Peter Gunn	Rafael Blanco	TV series	Episode: "The Briefcase"
1959	Lawman	Newt Whittaker	TV series	Episode: "Warpath"
1960	Alfred Hitchcock Presents	Pawnbroker Employee	TV series	Season 6 Episode 1: "Mrs. Bixby and the Colonel's Coat"
1960	From the Terrace	Creighton Duffy	Film	
1960	Pay or Die	Enrico Caruso	Film	
1960	Pete and Gladys	Burke	TV series	Episode "Pete Takes Up Golf"
1960	Gunsmoke	Brady	TV series	"Big Tom"
1961	Alfred Hitchcock Presents	Mr. Dahl	TV series	Season 7 Episode 7: "You Can't Be a Little Girl All Your Life"
1961	Two Faces West	Jethro	TV series	Episode: "The Vials"
1961	Judgment at Nuremberg	Hugo Wallner	Film	
1962	My Three Sons	Police Sergeant	TV series	Episode: "Chip Leaves Home"
1962	Brushfire	Vlad	TV film	
1962	Straightaway	Carson	TV series	Episode: "Full Circle"
1962	Leave It to Beaver	A Crooked Dairy Foreman	TV series	Episode: "Eddie, the Businessman"
1962	87th Precinct	Meinig	TV series	Episode: "Idol in the Dust"
1962	Pressure Point	Tavern Owner	TV film	
1962	Fair Exchange	Assorted roles	TV series	4 episodes
1963	The Man from the Diner's Club	Claude Bassanio	TV film	
1963	The Many Loves of Dobie Gillis	R.J. Crumley	TV series	Episode: "The Call of the, Like, Wild"
1963	The Travels of Jaimie McPheeters	The Indian, "Afraid-of-His-Horse"	TV series	Episodes: "The Day of the Pawnees, Part 1" and "Part 2"
1963	The Twilight Zone	Nick Bloss	TV series	Episode: "He's Alive"
1964	The Outer Limits	Leon Chambers	TV series	Episode: "The Chameleon"
1965	The Alfred Hitchcock Hour	Mr. Setlin	TV series	Season 3 Episode 22: "Thou Still Unravished Bride"
1965	Get Smart	Dr. Fish	TV series	Episode: "The Day Smart Turned Chicken"
1965	My Favorite Martian	The Sultan, English	TV series	Episode: "The Bottled Martin"
1965-1971	Hogan's Heroes	Major Wolfgang Hochstetter, Major Keitel, Colonel Feldcamp	TV series	37 as Maj. Hochstetter, 1 as Major Keitel in "Happy Birthday, Adolf" (1966) and 1 as Colonel Feldcamp in "The Battle of Stalag 13" (1966)
1966	Death Valley Days	Various roles	TV series	3 episodes
1966	Alvarez Kelly	McIntyre	Film	
1966	The Doomsday Flight	L.A. dispatcher	TV film	
1967	Rango	Gayfor Ashton	TV series	Episode: "Gunfight at the K.O. Saloon"
1967	Get Smart	Various roles	TV series	4 episodes
1967	The Rat Patrol	Major Bracken	TV series	Episode: "The Violent Truce Raid"
1970	Watermelon Man	Mr. Townsend	Film	
1972	1776	Lewis Morris	Film	
1976	Helter Skelter	Everett Scoville	TV film	
1978	The Paper Chase	Mr. Bond	TV series	Episode: "The Seating Chart"
1979	Scooby-Doo and Scrappy-Doo	Additional voice	TV series	
1980	Marilyn: The Untold Story	Billy Wilder	TV film	
1982	Forced Vengeance	Milt Diamond	Film	
1982	The Scooby & Scrappy-Doo/Puppy Hour	Additional voices	TV series	
1983	The New Scooby and Scrappy-Doo Show	Additional voices	TV series	
1984	Challenge of the GoBots	Additional voices	TV series	
1984	Super Friends: The Legendary Super Powers Show	Dan Corwin (voice)	TV series	Episode: "Island of the Dinosoids"
1984	Super Friends: The Legendary Super Powers Show	King Timon (voice)	TV series	Episode: "The Royal Ruse"
1986	The New Adventures of Jonny Quest	Additional voices	TV series	
1988	The Days and Nights of Molly Dodd	Mr. Endakis	TV series	Episode: "Here's Another Cryptic Message from Upstate"
1988	War and Remembrance	Lord Maxwell Beaverbrook	TV miniseries	2 episodes, final appearance
