= Timebomb (1991 film) =

- Theatrical release poster
- Directed by: Avi Nesher
- Written by: Avi Nesher
- Produced by: Raffaella De Laurentiis
- Starring: Michael Biehn; Patsy Kensit; Tracy Scoggins; Robert Culp; Richard Jordan
- Cinematography: Anthony B. Richmond
- Music by: Patrick Leonard
- Production company: Rafaella
- Distributed by: Metro-Goldwyn-Mayer
- Release date: September 27, 1991
- Running time: 96 minutes
- Country: United States
- Language: English
- Budget: $7 million
- Box office: $64,562 (US)

Timebomb is a 1991 American science-fiction action film written and directed by Avi Nesher and starring Michael Biehn, Patsy Kensit, and Richard Jordan.

== Plot ==
Mild-mannered watchmaker Eddy Kay runs into a burning building to save a trapped woman and is featured in the news as a result. Watching the news, Colonel Taylor is shocked to see Eddy, whom he had assumed to be dead. A game of cat and mouse begins as Eddy, with the help of psychiatrist Dr. Anna Nolmar, tries to discover his past and why they want him dead.

Eddy and Dr. Nolmar discover that he was part of a secret government program to create assassins. Using various sensory deprivation and brainwashing techniques, the assassins could be sent to infiltrate other organizations and facilities undetected and carry out programmed missions. Eddy manages to capture and interrogate one of the female assassins, finding out the Colonel's current assassination plan. He then plots to confront Colonel Taylor and put an end to the assassination program once and for all.

== Cast ==
- Michael Biehn as Eddy Kaye
- Patsy Kensit as Anna Nolmar
- Richard Jordan as Colonel Taylor
- Tracy Scoggins as Blue
- Billy Blanks as Mr. Brown
- Jim Maniaci as Mr. Grey
- Robert Culp as Phillips
- Raymond St. Jacques as Detective Sanchez
- Julius Zagon as Dr. Kosyez

Actress and comedienne Julie Brown makes an uncredited cameo as Waitress At Al's Diner.

== Production ==
The film was shot under the title Nameless with a budget of $7 million.

Producers originally wanted Jean-Claude Van Damme or Chuck Norris to play Kay, but Nesher saw Biehn as perfect for the role due to his performance in The Abyss. Biehn himself took a pay cut to show his dedication to the film.

Biehn underwent intensive military training for several weeks to prepare for the role.

== Release ==
MGM gave the film a limited theatrical release on September 27, 1991.

The film was released as a VOD title on DVD by MGM on December 23, 2011.
