= Nossa Senhora dos Mártires =

Cargo ship wrecked in 1606 at the mouth of the River Tagus, near Lisbon, Portugal

History

Portugal
- Name: Nossa Senhora dos Mártires
- Owner: Casa da Índia
- Port of registry: Lisbon, Kingdom of Portugal
- Builder: Ribeira das Naus
- In service: 1605
- Out of service: 1606
- Fate: Sank after hitting a rock

General characteristics
- Type: Carrack

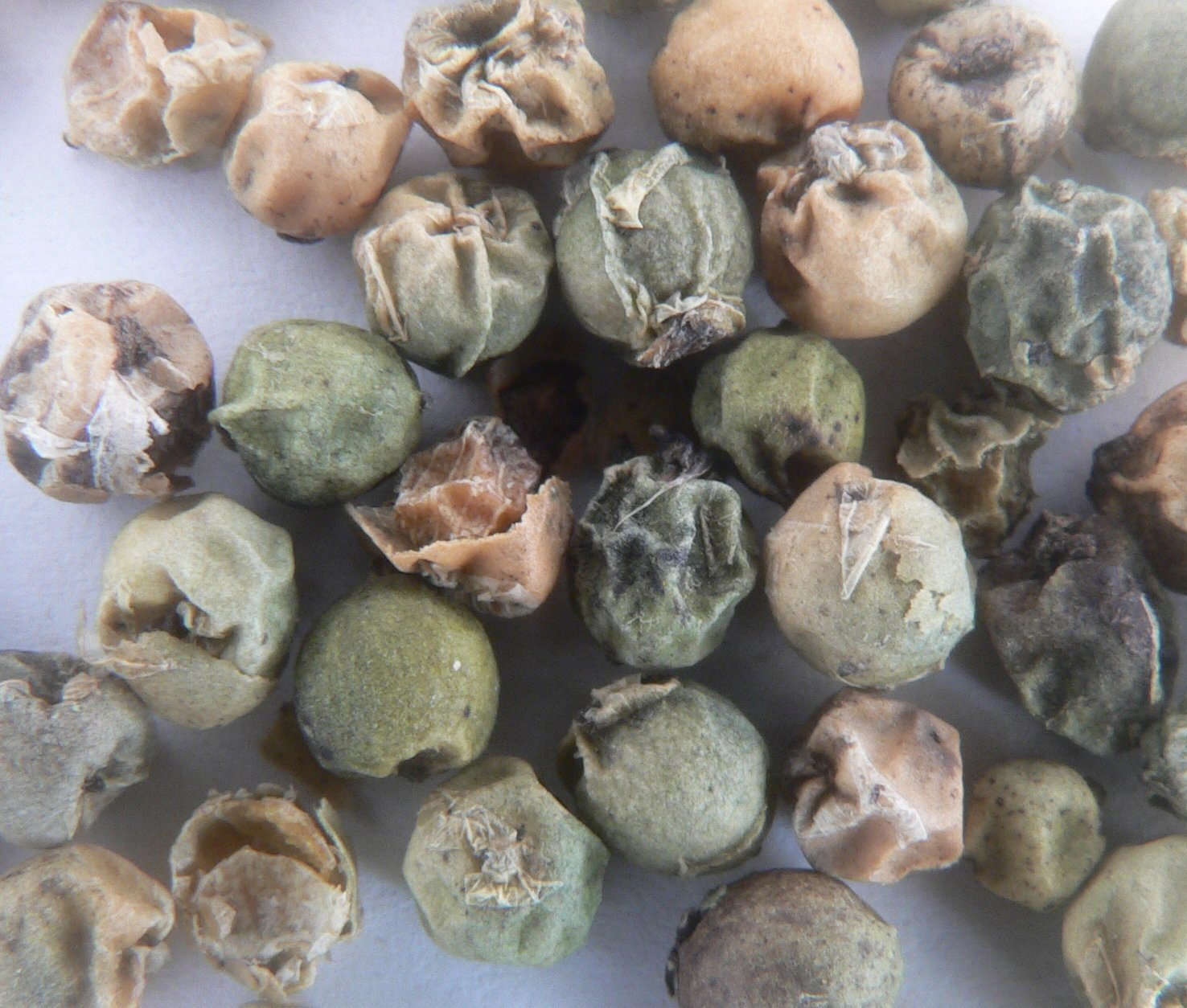
Peppercorns of Piper nigrum, the major cargo of the Nossa Senhora dos Mártires at its demise.

The Nossa Senhora dos Mártires was a cargo ship that wrecked in 1606 at the mouth of the River Tagus, near Lisbon, Portugal, and subsequently excavated between 1996 and 2001. The ship had been seeking safer anchorage in the Tagus during strong winds, but she struck a submerged rock and went down close to shore with no loss of life. Also known as The Pepper Wreck, it is so called because its major cargo at the time was peppercorns of black pepper, Piper nigrum, which carpeted the river and were harvested along with the fittings and other cargo by the population.

The Museu Nacional de Arqueologia identified the debris on the bottom in 1993 and designated the site as São Julião da Barra 2 (SJB2). The ship was of a type called the "nau", a cargo vessel, used as an Indiaman. Constructed in 1605 in the Ribeira das Naus, the royal shipyard in Lisbon, it set sail under captain Manuel Barreto in that year as part of an armada, or convoy, consisting of ten ships: four galleons and six naus, sent out by the Casa da Índia, a government trade organization, to Goa, then under Dutch blockade. After loading a cargo of pepper, classified by the government along with all spices as drogas ("drugs", literally meaning "dry goods") it completed the return voyage and anchored off the mouth of the Tagus. A strong wind caused some other ships to pull anchor, inspiring their captains to move further into the river. Seeking to follow their example, the Nossa Senhora dos Mártires struck a rock and went down suddenly on 14 September 1606. Although scanty, the hull remains have preserved carpenters marks that allowed a tentative reconstruction of the ship's hull.

Until the 2008 discovery of the Bom Jesus shipwreck near Oranjemund in Namibia, this shipwreck was the only known Portuguese Indiaman from the 16th and early 17th centuries not destroyed by treasure hunters.

== Bibliography ==
- Castro, Filipe Vieira de (2005). The Pepper Wreck: A Portuguese Indiaman at the Mouth of the Tagus River. Texas A&M University Press. ISBN 978-1-58544-390-1.
