= Maria Tsien =

American actress (1925–2020)

- 林碧瑶
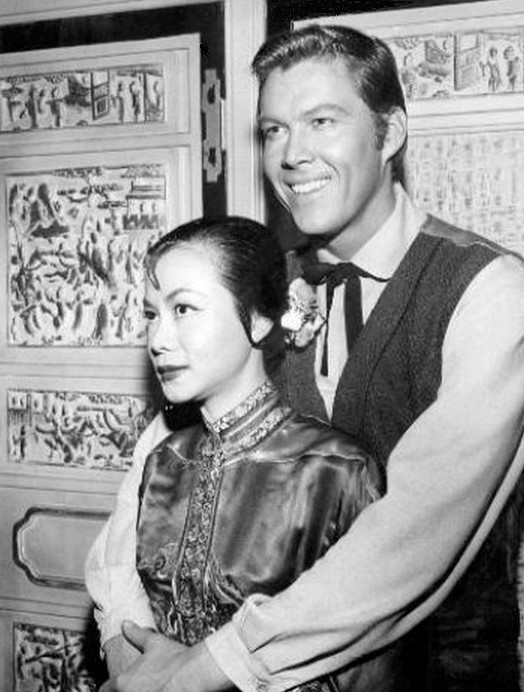
- Maria with Adam Kennedy in The Californians, 1958.
- Born: February 4, 1925; Manila, Philippines
- Died: November 2, 2020 (aged 95)
- Occupations: Actress, Model
- Years active: 1954–1964
- Spouses: Ernest Tsien; Booker McClay (1958–2009)
- Children: Lawrence McClay

Maria Lim Bi Yao (Chinese: 林碧瑶; February 4, 1925 – November 2, 2020), known professionally as Maria Tsien (sometimes also credited as Marie Tsien and Maria Tsien McClay) was an American film and television actress in the 1950s and 1960s. She was often cast in productions that were set in Asia, to fill out non-Asian casts.

== Filmography ==
=== Film ===
Year	Title	Role	Notes
1955	Love Is a Many-Splendored Thing	Rosie Wu	Uncredited
1955	The Left Hand of God	Woman in Kimono	Uncredited
1955	Kismet	Harem Showgirl	Uncredited
1956	The King and I	Royal Wife	Uncredited
1957	The 27th Day	Su Tan	Uncredited
1957	Omar Khayyam	Chinese Girl	Uncredited
1959	Never So Few	Eurasian Girl Jeanine	Uncredited
1960	All the Young Men	Korean Woman	
1961	A Majority Of One	Japanese Maid	
	One-Eyed Jacks	Townswoman	Uncredited
1962	Brushfire!	Lin Chan	

=== Television ===
Year	Title	Role	Notes
1954	The New Adventures of China Smith	Jade Flower	Season 2, Episode 14: "The Night The Dragon Walked"
1954	The New Adventures of China Smith	Miss Giong (Giong Ko Fon)	Season 2, Episode 24: "The Tidewalker"
1954	The New Adventures of China Smith	Li Mei, Lunan, Gin Len and 5 other characters	Various Episodes, uncredited
1955	Crusader	Mrs. Chen (Chen Li Kiao)	Season 1, Episode 22: "Pressure"
1955	Crusader	Milly Thong	1 Episode
1955	Passport to Danger	Javanese Girl Lua Mindon	Season 1, Episode 28: "Rangoon"
1956	Navy Log	Miss Ondori	Season 1, Episode 30: "The Beachcomber"
1956	The 20th Century Fox Hour	Nurse	Season 2, Episode 1: "Child Of The Regiment"
1956	The Man Called X	Sou Hei	Season 1, Episode 10: "Local Hero"
1958	December Bride	Tahitian Glamour Girl Tanana	Season 5, Episode 2: "The Alaska Show"
1958	Frontier Doctor	Mei Ling	Season 1, Episode 16: "Illegal Entry"
1958	The Adventures of Ozzie and Harriet	Japanese Student Makiesho Yamaguchi	Season 6, Episode 33: "The International Set"
1958	The Californians	Mei Soong	Season 1, Episode 17: "China Doll"
1959	Bat Masterson	Dealer	Season 2, Episode 1: "To The Manner Born"
1959	Alcoa Theatre	Japanese Shop Clerk	Season 2 Episode 35: "Medals For Harry", uncredited
1959	Man Without A Gun	Chi Ying	Season 2, Episode 7: "Daughter Of The Dragon"
1959	Not For Hire	Lilly	Season 1, Episode 7: "One Quart Of Sorrow"
1960	Hawaiian Eye	Su Ling	Season 1, Episode 19: "Hong Kong Passage"
1961	Hong Kong	Sou Mei	Season 1, Episode 17: "Night Cry"
1961	You Bet Your Life	Herself, as a contestant	Season 11, Episode 19: "Dress"
1962	87th Precinct	Mary	Season 1, Episode 24: "Square Cop"
	Bachelor Father	Lin Sing	Season 5, Episode 22: "Summer Romance"
1964	Burke's Law	Japanese Girl ("Madame Butterfly"/Amiko)	Season 1, Episode 20 "Who Killed Carrie Cornell?"
	The Loretta Young Show	French-Burmese Maid Lia	
	Jack Douglas Show	Dance Hall Girl, Smuggler	
