= Raise the Titanic! =

1976 novel by Clive Cussler

- First edition (US, hardcover).
- Author: Clive Cussler
- Cover artist: Garden Studio
- Language: English
- Series: Dirk Pitt Novels
- Genre: Adventure, techno-thriller
- Publisher: Viking Press (US); Michael Joseph (UK)
- Publication date: 1976
- Publication place: United States
- Media type: Print (hardback and paperback)
- Pages: 314 pp (Hardcover edition)
- ISBN: 0-670-58933-0
- OCLC: 2347062
- Dewey Decimal: 813/.5/4
- LC Class: PZ4.C9856 Rai PS3553.U75
- Preceded by: Iceberg
- Followed by: Vixen 03

Raise the Titanic! is a 1976 adventure novel by Clive Cussler, published in the United States by the Viking Press. It tells the story of efforts to bring the remains of the ill-fated ocean liner RMS Titanic to the surface of the Atlantic Ocean in order to recover a stockpile of an exotic mineral that was being carried aboard.

Raise the Titanic! was the third published book to feature the author's protagonist, Dirk Pitt. It was the first of Cussler's novels with a prologue set long before the main story, describing an incident with consequences resolved in the present day.

The book was adapted into a 1980 feature film, Raise the Titanic, directed by Jerry Jameson. The film was produced by Lord Grade's ITC Entertainment. Although it starred respected and popular actors and boasted a big budget, the movie was a box office bomb and received little critical or popular praise and was also disliked by Cussler.

== Plot ==
In 1987, Dr. Gene Seagram leads the top-secret Pentagon program Meta Section, which secretly attempts to leapfrog current technology by 20 to 30 years. One result: the Sicilian Project, which uses sound waves to stop incoming ballistic missiles. The immense power needs of the Sicilian Project can be met only by an extremely rare mineral called Byzanium. After satellite data pinpoints the most likely source of Byzanium, Meta Section sends Sid Koplin to Novaya Zemlya, an island off the northern coast of the Soviet Union. There he discovers that the byzanium ore has already been mined. While making his way back to his hidden boat Koplin is shot and captured by a Soviet guard but is rescued by Dirk Pitt.

Using clues found by Koplin, Seagram determines that the byzanium — a chunk worth more than a quarter of a billion dollars in 1912 figures — was mined in the early part of the 20th century by a group of Coloradan miners led by Joshua Hayes Brewster. The group was originally hired by the French government, but persuaded by the U.S. government to steal the mineral for the United States. Brewster and his men engage in a running battle with French assassins as they make their way across Europe trying to get their stolen goods home. Only Brewster reaches Southampton alive, and he books passage on the maiden voyage of the great White Star Line ship RMS Titanic.

Realizing that the only supply of byzanium sufficient to power the Sicilian Project now lies at the bottom of the North Atlantic, Dr. Seagram approaches Dirk Pitt and the National Underwater and Marine Agency and gives them the near impossible task of raising the Titanic. Using data from drop tank experiments Pitt is able to narrow down the search area and begin searching with deep sea submersibles. After finding a presentation model cornet that they can link positively to a member of the Titanic's band, Pitt and his colleagues know they are searching in the right place. After discovering the Titanic intact, they set out on an audacious plan to patch all of the holes and then raise the wreck using compressed air.

Meanwhile the Central Intelligence Agency convinces the President of the United States to leak information on both the Sicilian Project and the Titanic mission to the Soviet Union in the hopes of setting a trap to capture one of the Soviets' best intelligence officers in the KGB. When Soviet leaders realize that the development of the Sicilian Project would throw off the balance of power in the world and leave their nuclear arsenal impotent, they do just as the CIA hopes and launch an operation to sabotage the mission and steal the byzanium for themselves.

Once the Titanic is secured for the trip to the United States, a massive hurricane strikes the salvage area, allowing the Soviets to covertly board the ship and take the crew hostage. Pitt is believed dead after being last seen on board a crashed helicopter—but he reemerges to expose the Soviet spies within the salvage crew. With the help of Navy SEALs who board from a hidden U.S. Navy submarine, the crew regain control of the Titanic. The ship is eventually towed to New York Harbor and laid up in the Brooklyn Navy Yard.

When the Titanic's vault is opened, all are shocked to discover the byzanium was never actually aboard the ship. This revelation, coupled with deep troubles with his marriage and the president's agreeing to leak word of the Sicilian Project to the Soviets, causes Dr. Seagram to have a nervous breakdown. Pitt, consulting the journal that had been kept by Joshua Hayes Brewster, decodes a cryptic entry to determine that Brewster—fearful that he would not make it onto the ship with the mineral—buried the byzanium in the grave of Vernon Hall, the last of the group to fall to the French assassins, located in the tiny English village of Southby. The novel ends with a successful test of the Sicilian Project in the Pacific Ocean.

== Characters ==
listed alphabetically

- Georgi Antonov - General Secretary of the Soviet Union who authorizes the attempt to sabotage the raising of the Titanic
- Adeline Austin - the widow of Jake Hobart
- Commodore Sir John L. Bigelow - the last surviving member of the Titanic crew
- Joshua Hayes Brewster - a well-known and respected mining engineer
- Marshall Collins - National Security Adviser to the U.S. President
- Mel Donner - one of two chief evaluators for Meta Section
- Ben Drummer - Russian spy in the employ of National Underwater and Marine Agency (NUMA)
- Graham Farley - the cornet player on the Titanic
- Al Giordino - Assistant Special Projects Director for the National Underwater and Marine Agency (NUMA)
- Commander Rudi Gunn - Commander of the Lorelei Current Drift Expedition
- Jake Hobart - one of "the Coloradans", an elite group of miners that dug mines in the Colorado Rockies in the early 20th century
- Officer Peter Jones - Washington, D.C. police officer
- Admiral Joseph Kemper - Chief of Naval Operations of the United States Navy
- Sid Koplin - professor of mineralogy sent to Novaya Zemlya by Meta Section in search of byzanium
- Lieutenant Pavel Marganin - Aide to Captain Prevlov who is, in fact, an American spy named Harry Koskoski
- Sam Merker - brother of Ben Drummer and also a Soviet spy on the NUMA crew
- Henry Munk - Sappho II crewman
- Warren Nicholson - Director of the CIA
- Captain Ivan Parotkin - Captain of the Soviet oceanographic research vessel Mikhail Kurkov
- Dirk Pitt - Special Projects Director for the National Underwater and Marine Agency (NUMA)
- Vladimir Polevoi - Chief of the Foreign Secrets Directorate of the KGB
- Captain Andre Prevlov - Russian intelligence officer for the Soviet Navy's Department of Foreign Intelligence; the Soviet Navy's top spymaster
- Admiral James Sandecker - Director of the National Underwater and Marine Agency (NUMA)
- Dr. Dana Seagram - wife of Dr. Gene Seagram of Meta Section; a marine archaeologist employed by National Underwater and Marine Agency (NUMA)
- Dr. Gene Seagram - physicist and a chief evaluator for Meta Section
- Dr. Murray Silverstein - Director of the Alexandria College of Oceanography
- Admiral Boris Sloyuk - Director of Soviet Naval Intelligence
- Vasily Tilevitch - Marshal of the Soviet Union and Chief Director of Soviet Security
- John Vogel - Chief curator for the Washington Museum's Hall of Music

== Publication details ==
- 1976, United States, The Viking Press 0-670-58933-0, October 26, 1976, hardcover
- 1976, United States, The Viking Press, hardcover book club edition
- 1976, Canada, The Macmillan Company of Canada Limited, hardcover
- 1977, United Kingdom, Michael Joseph Limited 0 7181 1579 1, hardcover
- 1990, United States, Pocket Books 0-671-72519-X, April 1, 1990, mass market paperback
- 2004, United States, Berkeley reissue edition 0-425-19452-3, February 3, 2004, paperback

== Critical response ==
Christopher Lehmann-Haupt of the New York Times Service said the book would "serve to pass a boring day", and that "if Cussler is bad at talk, he is good at ships and gadgets and storms". Martin Levine in Newsday held that "the book contains about 100 quite reasonably gripping pages" but that "the writing is bad, bad, bad". Writing in the Baltimore Sun, Robert Aptapton said the novel was "wretchedly written, absurdly plotted, peopled with characters who spout comic book lingo".

== Comics adaptation ==
An adaptation of the novel was serialized as the first story in the short-lived comic strip "Best Sellers Showcase". The adaptation ran from August 15 to October 9, 1977. Depending on the newspaper, the Sunday color strip appeared in two versions. One version had a title box followed by two frames of story resulting in a three row episode. The other version did not have the title box nor the following two frames thereby resulting in a two row episode.

== Prequel ==
A prequel to Raise the Titanic! was published by Clive Cussler and Jack Du Brul in September 2019 entitled The Titanic Secret. The story describes the details of Joshua Hayes Brewster and his mining team's escape from Novaya Zemlya and pursuit across Europe. The story is told from the perspective of Isaac Bell who has been hired to investigate the apparent death of Brewster and his mining team.

== See also ==
- The Ghost from the Grand Banks; a novel by Arthur C. Clarke featuring the halves of the Titanic being raised by two different factions
