= Bom Jesus (ship) =

Archaeological site in Namibia

- location in Namibia
- 28°35′58″S 16°23′51″E
- Region: Namibia

The Bom Jesus was a Portuguese nau and Indiaman that set sail from Lisbon, Portugal, on Friday, March 7, 1533. Its fate was unknown until 2008, when its remains were discovered during diamond mining operations on the coast of Namibia, near Oranjemund. Today, the Bom Jesus is the oldest known and most valuable shipwreck ever discovered off the Western coast of Sub-Saharan Africa.

== History of the Bom Jesus ==
=== Origin ===
The Bom Jesus was a Portuguese trading vessel constructed in the early 1500s during a period of intensive expansion of the Portuguese Empire under Manuel I of Portugal. While little is known about the history of the Bom Jesus itself, it is speculated that the ship was part of a class of naval vessels that were larger, more efficient, and more durable than previous Portuguese and Spanish vessels in order to facilitate the longer-distance expeditions carried out by Portuguese fleets during this time. Based on the contents of the shipwreck, including an array of luxury items and currencies, archaeologist Dieter Noli and other scholars believe the ship was on course for western India from its home port in Lisbon, Portugal around the southern tip of Africa, a common route for similar Portuguese nau during this time that carried the same cargo. These naus commonly sailed between Portugal and China, India, and Japan, often carrying valuable and exotic cargo such as gold, copper, spices, ivory, weaponry, and silks to and from these markets.

=== Shipwreck ===
It is speculated that the Bom Jesus sank when it was pulled too closely to shore in a storm off the coast of Namibia, causing the ship's hull to collide with a rock and lean over, capsizing the vessel. This hypothesis is supported by the fact that the coin chest from the captain's quarters was found at the bottom of the ocean off the coast, likely due to the chest falling out after the hull was breached by the initial collision. As the Bom Jesus moved towards shore, the superstructure and hull likely broke apart and scattered the ship and its contents along the coastline, and these were later accidentally scattered further during construction of large sand retaining walls around the site. The condition the ship was found in suggests that the storm that caused the shipwreck was especially violent, although an absence of human remains (besides a few scattered bone fragments) in the site suggest that most of the crew on board survived the wreck or died at sea.

== Discovery ==
=== Initial discovery ===
Until 2017 the mining town of Oranjemund on the Atlantic coast was run by Namdeb, a company jointly owned by the Namibian government and the diamond mining and trading company De Beers. On April 1, 2008, Kaapanda Shadika, an employee of De Beers, discovered a collection of copper ingots and remnants of elephant ivory while excavating an inshore area licensed to the company. Upon further inspection, archaeologist Dieter Noli, a contractor of the De Beers company, concluded that the shipwreck was of ancient origin and enlisted the help of maritime archaeologist Bruno Werz of the South African Institute of Maritime Archaeology (SAIMA).

=== Initial conditions of the Bom Jesus ===
Upon its initial discovery, the remains of the ship were scattered in three large sections running along the coast. According to archaeologist Francisco Alves, the contents of the shipwreck were all covered in a moist, one meter-thick layer of "orange-layered concretion" built up from chemical, biological, and sedimentary processes in the coastal soil, helping to preserve much of the hull and wooden structure of the ship in the seawater-rich ground. A majority of the cargo was initially found scattered loosely between the three large digging sites, including copper ingots, ivory, nautical tools, and cannons that were easily dug out of the sand. The remainder of the cargo discovered, such as iron ingots, weaponry, and fragments of the wooden hull, were found encased in lime and hard-packed sandy concretions. While these conditions helped to preserve and protect the contents of the ship, this concretion made their identification and recovery especially difficult for archaeologists on-site.

=== Excavation efforts ===
About a month after initial archaeological digging and surveying began, Bloomberg announced the discovery of the shipwreck on the internet, bringing international attention to the site and its significance, specifically the discovery of a rare Portuguese cruzado coin by on-site archaeologist Paulo Monterio. This international publicity put pressure on the Namibian government to seek out external sources of archaeological and scientific assistance given the urgency of the site's integrity, a result of the large sand retaining walls around the shipwreck that protected the site from ocean water, which were at risk of being eroded due to seasonal weather and damaging the ship's hull. As a result, a meeting was held between the Namibian government and other organizations interested in involvement with the excavation of the site, including delegates Filipe Castro and Donny Hamilton of the anthropology department of Texas A&M University, and representatives of the Portuguese and Spanish government who agreed to terms with the Namibian government to find out the true origin of the Bom Jesus, which at this time was unknown. After brief deliberation, an Oranjemund Statement was drafted, stating that the Namibian government would allow representatives of the Texas A&M archaeology department and the Portuguese government to collaborate in the excavation of the ship, while the Namibian government would subsidize the reconstruction of the surrounding retaining walls.

== Identification and analysis of cargo ==
=== Catalog of cargo ===
Among the over 40 tons of cargo retrieved from the excavation site, thousands of different artifacts were recovered and cataloged, including cannons, firearms, swords, lead, tin, textiles, and astronomical devices. However, the most bountiful discoveries of the shipwreck were the collection of 1,845 copper ingots weighing approximately 16-17 tons, over 2,000 gold and silver coins from multiple contemporary maritime powers, and 105 different elephant tusks weighing close to 2 tons. The discovery was unusual in that all of the ship's contents were able to be recovered and cataloged without interference from scavengers due to the highly secure nature of De Beers mining operations in the area.

=== Copper ingots ===
A majority of the copper ingots found in the shipwreck have a hemispherical shape and are relatively standardized in both weight and size, leading archaeologists on the site to conclude that these copper ingots originated mostly from the same location and smelting processes. Because these copper ingots were so well preserved, as a result of their protection from ocean water by the hull of the ship, archaeologists on-site were able to study an unusual trident-shaped mark on the aged metal. These stamped trademarks on the copper ingots were found to belong to Anton Fugger of the Fugger family, tracing their origins to the Fugger Trading Company of Augsburg, Germany, one of Renaissance Europe's wealthiest companies in the world at the time. Historical documentation surrounding the Fugger Trading Company during this time indicate that Lisbon and other major Portuguese centers of trade were heavily involved in commerce with the Fugger family, explaining the discovery of such a large load of these copper ingots on board. Historical accounts of this period, as well as geochemical analyses of the copper onboard, indicate that these copper ingots were produced by the Fugger-Thurzo company in the Slovak Ore Mountains of Slovakia.

=== Elephant ivory ===
Because of how well the shipwreck and its contents were preserved, archaeologists and geneticists on-site were able to successfully sequence DNA from 71 percent of the 105 different elephant tusks on board using mitochondrial and nuclear DNA analysis. Using isotope analysis, as well as studying the relative sizes and densities of the tusks, archaeologists concluded that these ivory samples likely originated from West African forests and savanna elephants, aligning with the locations of Portuguese ivory trading posts in Africa during this time. These genetic results also indicate that the ivory aboard the Bom Jesus originated from around 17 different "herds" of elephants in this region. As Portugal rose to prominence as a world trading power during this time, they would follow suit of other European powers and pay for Asian commodities with African ivory. The establishment of a Portuguese fort at the mouth of the Dahomey Gap in Benin in 1482 suggest that ivory hunted in this region was sent to the islands of Cape Verde and São Tomé to be processed before being shipped to Lisbon, where it would embark on its journey to Asian markets.

=== Coinage ===
Of the collection of 2,159 coins recovered from the Bom Jesus, a majority were Spanish Excellentes, although Portuguese, Venetian, French, and Moorish coinage was recovered as well. The presence of such a great amount of Spanish coinage onboard initially led archaeologists to believe the ship was of Spanish origin, but this hypothesis was quickly abandoned after further inspection by Portuguese archaeology crews. The inscriptions and designs on the Portuguese coinage, portraying the emblem of John III of Portugal, helped archaeologists to date the shipwreck back to the 1530s upon its initial discovery. However, the identification of the ship is approximate, due to the Portuguese archives of maritime trade activity during this time being completely destroyed in the 1755 Lisbon earthquake.

Distribution of coins according to "O Tesouro do Bom Jesus" by Luis Filipe F. R. Thomas

	Coin	Average weight (g)	Unit value in Ducat	Number of coins	Total Weight (g)	Total Value in Ducat	%
Portugal	Cruzados de D. Manuel	3,5	1	3	10,5	3	
Portugal	Cruzados de D. João III	3,5	1	2	7,0	2	
Portugal	Portugueses de D. João III	35	10	172	6.020,0	1.720	
Portugal	Total			177	6.037,5	1.725	30,58%
Spain	Excelente Reyes Católicos	3,5	1	152	532,0	152	
Spain	Doblas Reyes Católicos	7	2	1.816	12.712,0	3.632	
Spain	Quádruplos Reyes Católicos	14	4	7	98,0	28	
Spain	Ducados de Nápoles	3,5	1	1	3,5	1	
Spain	Ducados de Valencia	3,5	1	1	3,5	1	
Spain	Doblas de Valencia	7	2	7	49,0	14	
Spain	Ducados de Cataluña	3,5	1	2	7,0	2	
Spain	Doblas de Cataluña	7	2	1	7,0	2	
Spain	Ducados de las dos Sicílias	3,5	1	1	3,5	1	
Spain	Doblas de Aragón Juana y Carlos	7	2	1	7,0	2	
Spain	Doblas de Cataluña Juana y Carlos	7	2	1	7,0	2	
Spain	Doblas de Navarra	7	2	1	7,0	2	
Spain	Doblas de Valencia Juana y Carlos	7	2	1	7,0	2	
Spain	Total			1.992	13.443,5	3.841	68,09%
Venetia	Cquins	3,5	1	2	7,0	2	
Florence	Florin	3,5	1	1	3,5	1	
Hungary	Ducat	3,5	1	3	10,5	3	
Rhodes	Ducat	3,5	1	1	3,5	1	
Morocco	Dirham	3,5	1	15	52,5	15	
Morocco	Dobla	7	2	16	112,0	32	
Unknown		3,5 or 7	1 or 2	16	84,0	21	
Others	Total			54	273,0	75	1,33%
	Total			2.223	19.754	5.641	

== Preservation of the Bom Jesus ==
Currently, work is underway to preserve and display the remains of the ship and all of its cargo in a public museum in Lisbon, Portugal. However, a lack of funding and permission from Namibian authorities has kept the ship's remains on-site in Oranjemund, storing a majority of the cargo and hull of the Bom Jesus in saltwater tanks for preservation until they can be safely transported.

== See also ==
- Nossa Senhora dos Mártires
- Sahara, the fictional story of a ship with treasure that was also found in an African desert
