= Dirk Pitt =

Fictional character in novels by American writer Clive Cussler

- Dirk Pitt adventure novels character
- First appearance: The Mediterranean Caper
- Created by: Clive Cussler
- Portrayed by: Richard Jordan, Matthew McConaughey
- Voiced by: Scott Brick

In-universe information
- Full name: Dirk Eric Pitt
- Gender: Male
- Weapon: Colt .45-caliber M1911
- Spouse: Congresswoman Loren Smith
- Significant others: Summer Moran, Maeve Fletcher
- Children: Dirk Pitt Jr. Summer Pitt
- Relatives: Senator George Pitt (father); Barbara Susan Pitt (née Nash) (mother); Percival Nash (maternal uncle) unnamed paternal uncle unnamed grandfather
- Nationality: United States
- Occupation: In early novels: Director, Special Projects, National Underwater and Marine Agency. Later: Director, National Underwater and Marine Agency
- Position: major in USAF

Dirk Pitt is a fictional character created by American novelist Clive Cussler and featured in a series of novels first published in 1976. Pitt is a larger-than-life hero reminiscent of pulp magazine icon Doc Savage. Pitt is a citizen of the United States, on loan from the United States Air Force with the rank of Major, after serving in the Vietnam War as a pilot. He manages to find adventure with his childhood best friend, Al Giordino, despite ending up with an ostensibly desk-bound role as the head of the National Underwater and Marine Agency. Pitt has a commanding presence, a quick wit, and a considerable collection of classic cars.

== Biography and career ==
Dirk Eric Pitt, renowned adventurer, is the son of Senator George Pitt of California. Dirk graduates from the United States Air Force Academy and serves as a pilot in the United States Air Force during the Vietnam War. Dirk is an accomplished pilot who is qualified to fly both fixed-wing and rotary aircraft. He goes on to attain the rank of major. Over the course of his service, Pitt is awarded the Distinguished Flying Cross with two clusters, a Silver Star, a Purple Heart and many other commendations.

Dirk Pitt receives one such commendation for shooting down the plane of Admiral James Sandecker. The plane was carrying the Admiral and his staff to a remote base north of Da Nang. Unknown to them, the base was overrun by the North Vietnamese and their radio was malfunctioning, so they were unable to receive a warning. Pitt was flying nearby returning to his base from a bombing mission and was ordered to intercept and alert the admiral by whatever means available. When efforts to communicate with the Admiral's plane were unsuccessful, Pitt expertly shot out both engines on the transport, forcing them to ditch in the sea instead of landing at the captured base. Dirk then flew cover, strafing any boats that left the shore, until everyone was taken aboard a navy patrol vessel. Cussler derived this story as well as some of Pitt's awards from the real life World War II veteran Louis Edward Curdes.

Dirk's service record is amended in the film versions of Raise the Titanic and Sahara, where he is said to have graduated from the U.S. Naval Academy. In both versions, Dirk graduates with his childhood best friend, Al Giordino.

After leaving the service, Dirk works as a marine engineer for the National Underwater and Marine Agency (NUMA), an oceanographic research organization headed by Admiral James Sandecker. In his career at NUMA, Dirk makes numerous shipwreck discoveries and thwarts countless plans by villains intent on global catastrophe or world domination.

In recent novels, Dirk becomes the head of NUMA, succeeding Admiral Sandecker when the latter is appointed Vice President of the United States after the sudden death in office of his predecessor. Despite his promotion, Pitt is uncomfortable with a desk job, and still heads numerous projects in the field, becoming entangled in villainous plots just as easily as before his promotion.

== Personal traits ==
Dirk is 6 ft 3 in (190.5 cm) tall with craggy looks, dark wavy hair, and a rangy build. Cussler refers often to Dirk's "opaline green eyes", which can be both alluring or intimidating, as need be. Pitt has a commanding presence which, combined with a quick, sly wit, often infuriates his adversaries and superiors. Comical banter with Al is especially common during stressful situations, leaving the reader with little doubt that both are confident in their abilities.

His weapon of choice is a Colt .45-caliber M1911 semi-automatic pistol that he received from his father. His drink of choice is blue agave Tequila. Dirk believes that quality tequila should be drunk straight with salt and lime, preferring to use cheaper tequila in margaritas. He wears an orange-faced Doxa Sub 300T Professional dive watch.

=== Classic car collection ===
When Dirk Pitt is not traveling, he lives in a remodeled and refurbished hangar on the grounds of Washington National Airport, near Washington, D.C. A cast-iron stairway leads into a cluttered apartment with maps of the sea and models of ships scattered all about. The hangar houses his substantial collection of classic and antique cars, as well as a Messerschmitt Me 262 aircraft, a Ford trimotor aircraft, a Pullman railroad dining car, and a totem pole. The hangar also contains items collected from prior adventures, such as a cast-iron bathtub with an outboard motor fixed to one end, and is protected by a state-of-the-art security system. Pitt occasionally adds classic cars to his collection, purloined from a variety of antagonists over the course of his adventures. The character shares his affinity for cars with his creator, the author Clive Cussler. Relatedly, Pitt is named after Dirk Cussler, Clive's son and sometime co-writer of the Dirk Pitt adventure stories.

== Love interests and family ==
Throughout his life, there are three women of significance:

- Summer Moran (Pacific Vortex!, Valhalla Rising)
- Maeve Fletcher (Shock Wave)
- Loren Smith (Vixen 03, Havana Storm)

=== Summer Moran ===
Summer Moran
- First appearance: Pacific Vortex!
- Last appearance: Valhalla Rising
- Created by: Clive Cussler

In-universe information
- Significant other: Dirk Pitt
- Children: Dirk Pitt Jr. Summer Pitt
- Relatives: Father: Delphi Moran. Grandfather: Dr. Frederick Moran.
- Nationality: United States

Dirk first meets Summer at Royal Hawaiian Hotel, when she is trying to seduce him where Dirk feels an instant attraction to her, and later tries to assassinate him.

She rescues Dirk Pitt from peril by swiftly severing the rope tethering his hands, deftly slipping a knife into his grasp just in time to thwart her father's men from orchestrating his demise in his hotel room.

Summer is the mother of his twin children, Dirk Pitt Jr. and Summer Pitt. She is often described as Pitt's first real love. The daughter of deranged scientist Frederick Moran, she is believed dead by Pitt when she is lost during an attempt to rescue her father as his underwater lair collapses. As revealed by 23-year-old Dirk Pitt Jr. when the two meet at the end of the novel Valhalla Rising, Summer in fact survives, badly maimed by the incident, and refuses to seek him out because she wants Pitt to remember her as he knew her. She gives birth to the twins shortly thereafter and raises them, naming them after their parents.

=== Maeve Fletcher ===
Dirk meets Maeve Fletcher in Shock Wave. Like Summer, she is also the daughter of a deranged, ruthless villain. However, she refuses to have any part in her family's dealings or with her father, the villain Arthur Dorsett. Maeve is the single mother of two children, who she raises on her salary as a tour guide aboard a cruise in the Antarctic when she and Pitt first meet. She holds a master's degree in zoology. Maeve and Dirk pledge their deepest love for each other, but unfortunately Maeve is already fatally wounded, and she dies in Pitt's arms.

=== Loren Smith ===
Pitt has a long-term relationship with Congresswoman Loren Smith, whom he marries before the book Havana Storm.

== Cars of Dirk Pitt ==
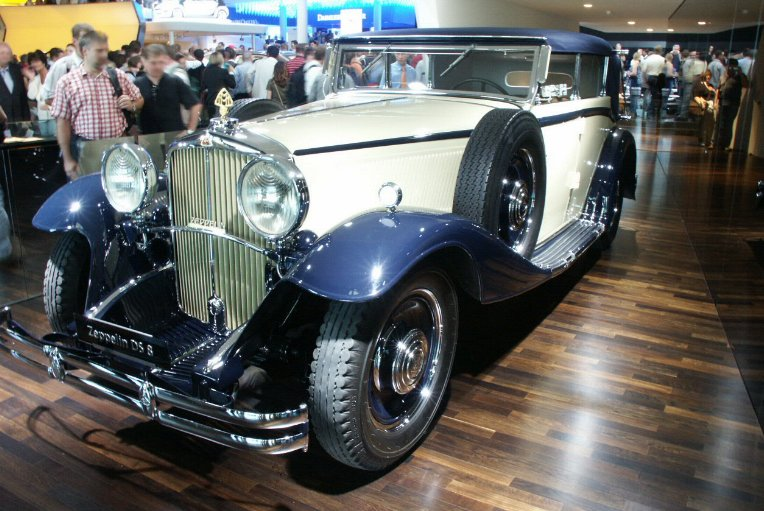
A 1936 Maybach Zeppelin was featured in The Mediterranean Caper

- The Mediterranean Caper - 1936 Maybach Zeppelin Town car
- Iceberg - (no car, but Pitt acquires the Ford Trimotor aircraft)
- Raise the Titanic! - (no car, but reference to a Stutz Bearcat Speedster, and a Renault town car recovered from the Titanic is mentioned in Vixen 03. A Rover Company vehicle, the model of which is unknown, but due to the year mentioned, 1987, it is either a Rover SD1 or Rover 800. The Ford Trimotor is also mentioned.)
- Vixen 03 - 1912 Renault open-drive landaulette
- Night Probe! - AC Cobra and Jensen (also a Pullman railroad dining car)
- Pacific Vortex! - AC Cobra
- Deep Six - Talbot-Lago
- Cyclops - Daimler DE36, 1957 Chevrolet (also a cast iron bathtub with an outboard motor strapped to it)
- Treasure - Cord L-29
- Dragon - 1932 Stutz (also acquires a Messerschmitt Me 262)
- Sahara - 1936 Avions Voisin
- Inca Gold - 1936 Pierce-Arrow Travelodge Trailer
- Shock Wave - Allard J2X (also a totem pole and Marvelous Maeve, a beatup boat)
- Flood Tide - 1929 Model J Duesenberg
- Atlantis Found - 1936 Ford Hot Rod
- Valhalla Rising - 1938 Packard Towncar
- Trojan Odyssey - Marmon V-16
- Black Wind - 1958 Chrysler 300-D Convertible
- Treasure of Khan - 1921 Rolls-Royce Silver Ghost
- Arctic Drift - 1932 Auburn V-12
- Crescent Dawn - 1948 Delahaye 135
- Poseidon's Arrow - 1930 Packard 734 Speedster Runabout

== List of novels and films ==
Dirk Pitt adventure novels

1. Pacific Vortex! (1983) - Written by Clive Cussler (though released at a later date, this is the first book that was written)
2. The Mediterranean Caper (a.k.a. Mayday, 1973)
3. Iceberg (1975)
4. Raise the Titanic! (1976)
5. Vixen 03 (1978)
6. Night Probe! (1981)
7. Deep Six (1984)
8. Cyclops (1986)
9. Treasure (1988)
10. Dragon (1990)
11. Sahara (1992)
12. Inca Gold (1994)
13. Shock Wave (1996)
14. Flood Tide (1997)
15. Atlantis Found (1999)
16. Valhalla Rising (2001)
17. Trojan Odyssey (2003)
18. Black Wind (2004) - Written with son Dirk Cussler
19. Treasure of Khan (2006) - Written with son Dirk Cussler
20. Arctic Drift (2008) - Written with son Dirk Cussler
21. Crescent Dawn (2010) - Written with son Dirk Cussler
22. Poseidon's Arrow (2012) - Written with son Dirk Cussler
23. Havana Storm (2014) - Written with son Dirk Cussler
24. Odessa Sea (2016) - Written with son Dirk Cussler
25. Celtic Empire (2019) - Written with son Dirk Cussler
26. Clive Cussler's The Devil's Sea (2021) - Written by Dirk Cussler
27. Clive Cussler The Corsican Shadow (2023) - Written by Dirk Cussler
28. Clive Cussler Obsidian Sky (2026) - Written by Dirk Cussler

=== Novel notes ===
Although Pacific Vortex! was released in 1983, it is actually the first Dirk Pitt novel chronologically. The events of Pacific Vortex! happen before those of The Mediterranean Caper. In fact, several events in Pacific Vortex! are referred to in The Mediterranean Caper. The series does not have to be read in order, since each book stands by itself.

There is also a Dirk Pitt reference book:

- Dirk Pitt and Clive Cussler Revealed (1998) - Written with Craig Dirgo, which contains photos and a synopsis of the books, as well as a compendium of cars, characters, villains and women that have appeared in the novels throughout the years. Also, there is a biography and interview with Cussler, and a short story "The Reunion", written from the perspective of a character who crashes a party at Pitt's hangar, meeting all the characters who had been predominant in the novels up to that time. Hints dropped throughout the story indicate that this unnamed character is Cussler himself.

=== Film notes ===
Pitt has twice appeared on the big screen, in movie adaptations of Raise the Titanic in 1980, and Sahara in 2005. In the former he was portrayed by Richard Jordan, and in the latter by Matthew McConaughey.

Clive Cussler sued the production company for the film Sahara, Crusader, in 2004, claiming the company reneged on a contract that gave him approval rights over the film's screenplay, when, in fact, he only had those rights until a director was hired. Crusader, which is owned by billionaire Philip Anschutz, then countersued, accusing Cussler of duping it into adapting his book into a film based on an inflated number of novels sold. Jurors ruled in May 2007 in favor of the production company. On March 10, 2009, Judge John P. Shook ordered Clive Cussler to pay $13.9 million in legal fees to Crusader. In his ruling, Judge Shook agreed with lawyers for Crusader Entertainment that an original contract between the two parties called for an award of legal fees if either side breached. "The issue boils down to whether the fees requested are reasonable and necessary," Shook said. He concluded that they were. On July 27, 2009, Cussler issued a final check to Crusader, which totals the payback to $20 million to the wronged production company. A March 2010 decision by the California Court of Appeal has since overturned the earlier awardings of both the $5 million in damages and nearly $14 million in legal fees to Crusader.

== Critical studies ==
Cussler's Dirk Pitt adventures are the focus of "The Clive Cussler Adventures: A Critical Review" by Steven Philip Jones.
