= Richard Jordan =

American film and theatrical actor (1937–1993)

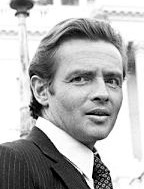
- Jordan in 1981
- Born: Robert Anson Jordan Jr. July 19, 1937; New York City, U.S.
- Died: August 30, 1993 (aged 56); Los Angeles, California, U.S.
- Occupation: Actor
- Years active: 1961–1993
- Spouse: Kathleen Widdoes (m. 1964; div. 1972)
- Partners: Blair Brown (1976–1985); Marcia Cross (1985–1993; his death)
- Children: 2
- Relatives: Learned Hand (grandfather); Newbold Morris (stepfather)

Robert Anson Jordan Jr. (July 19, 1937 – August 30, 1993), known professionally as Richard Jordan, was an American actor. A long-time member of the New York Shakespeare Festival, he performed in many Off Broadway and Broadway plays. His films include: Logan's Run, Les Misérables, Old Boyfriends, Raise the Titanic, The Friends of Eddie Coyle, The Yakuza, Interiors, The Bunker, Dune, The Secret of My Success, Timebomb, The Hunt for Red October, Posse and Gettysburg.

== Early life ==
Jordan was born in New York City to Robert Anson Jordan Sr. from Boston, Massachusetts, and Constance (née Hand) from New York. His maternal grandfather was Learned Hand, judge of the United States Court of Appeals for the Second Circuit, and one of the most highly respected jurists in the United States. In 1942, when Jordan was five years old, his parents divorced. His mother married Newbold Morris, president of the New York City Council. Mayor Fiorello H. La Guardia officiated at the ceremony held in Gracie Mansion, the first marriage performed there. Jordan attended the Hotchkiss School in Lakeville, Connecticut. Following his graduation from Harvard University in 1958, he furthered his studies at the Universite du Theatre des Nations in Paris.

== Career ==
Jordan told the friends he made early in his career that he took the stage name Richard because he wanted to avoid being confused with another actor named Robert Jordan. He continued to be known as Bob to those friends.

In 1961, Jordan appeared on Broadway with Art Carney and Elizabeth Ashley in Take Her, She's Mine. He also began working in television productions, appearing in episodes of The Defenders, Naked City, Ben Casey, Empire, and The Wide Country. He performed with Joseph Papp's Public Theater in productions of Shakespeare's plays, such as The Tempest, The Merchant of Venice and As You Like It. In 1966, Jordan returned to Broadway, at the Morosco Theatre appearing in Generation with Henry Fonda.

In 1970, Jordan made his film debut in Lawman (1971), and Valdez Is Coming (1971), with Burt Lancaster, and appeared opposite Robert Mitchum twice: in The Friends of Eddie Coyle (1973), as the informant-Coyle's handler, a pragmatic U.S. Treasury agent; and in The Yakuza (1975), as the bodyguard of Mitchum's friend, George Tanner. He played a host of villains and mixed good guy-villains in films such as the western Rooster Cogburn (1975), sci-fi adventure Logan's Run (1976), and the Woody Allen-directed drama Interiors (1978). He played the father of his own daughter, Nina in Old Boyfriends (1979), alongside Talia Shire.

While his film career developed, Jordan continued performing on the stage, joining Ralph Waite in the L.A. Actors' Theatre. He wrote, directed, and performed in plays such as Venus of Menschen Falls (1978). In 1976, Jordan earned a Golden Globe award for his role as Joseph Armagh, an Irish immigrant who fights his way to power and wealth in Captains and the Kings.

In the 1980s, Jordan performed in a number of feature films, such as Raise the Titanic (1980), Flash of Green (1984), Dune (1984), The Mean Season (1985), and The Secret of My Success (1987). He co-starred in an acclaimed television production of The Bunker (1981), playing Albert Speer to Anthony Hopkins's Adolf Hitler. In 10 episodes of the television series The Equalizer (1987–1988), he played the lead role of Harley Gage while series star Edward Woodward recovered from a heart attack.

On stage, Jordan won an Obie award for his appearance in New York in the Czech playwright Václav Havel's A Private View (1983), and an L.A. Drama Critics' Award for directing Largo Desolato (1987), another Havel play. Jordan played Romero's friend, Father Rutilio Grande in Romero (1989).

In 1990, Jordan directed a production of Macbeth in New York City. He played U.S. National Security Advisor Jeffrey Pelt in The Hunt for Red October. He starred in a television production of Three Hotels (1991), and the 1991 "Deadline" episode of Tales from the Crypt. In Posse (1993),

Jordan's last film to be released was Gettysburg (1993), filmed during the summer of 1992. He portrayed Brig. Gen. Lewis "Lo" Armistead, one of the Confederate officers who took part in Pickett's Charge at the battle of Gettysburg. Producer-director Ronald F. Maxwell dedicated the film to Jordan and to author Michael Shaara, whose novel The Killer Angels (1974) had been adapted for the film.

== Personal life ==
Jordan married actress Kathleen Widdoes in 1964, but they divorced in 1972. Their daughter Nina Jordan (1964-2026) played Richard's daughter in the film Old Boyfriends. His son Robert Hand Jordan was born in 1983, during his nine-year relationship with actress Blair Brown. At the time of his death, Jordan was in a relationship with actress Marcia Cross, twenty-five years his junior.

== Death ==
By 1993, Jordan's health began to fail and he was diagnosed with a brain tumor. Cast as Dr. Charles Nichols, he was filming The Fugitive in April 1993 when his illness forced him to withdraw. He was replaced by Jeroen Krabbé. He died on August 30, 1993, at the age of 56, cared for by his daughter Nina and his companion, Marcia Cross.

A memorial in Jordan's honor was held at the Mark Taper Forum in Los Angeles on October 8, 1993, the day Gettysburg was released.

== Filmography ==
=== Film ===
Richard Jordan film credits
Year	Title	Role	Notes
1971	Lawman	Crowe Wheelwright	
1971	Valdez Is Coming	R.L. Davis	
1972	The Trial of the Catonsville Nine	George Mische	
1972	Chato's Land	Earl Hooker	
1973	Kamouraska	Georges Nelson	
1973	The Friends of Eddie Coyle	Dave Foley	
1974	The Yakuza	Dusty	
1975	Rooster Cogburn	Hawk	
1976	Logan's Run	Francis	
1977	Alibis	Paul	
1978	Interiors	Frederick	
1979	Old Boyfriends	Jeff Turrin	
1979	A Nightingale Sang in Berkeley Square	Pinky	
1980	Raise the Titanic	Dirk Pitt	
1984	Dune	Duncan Idaho	
1984	A Flash of Green	Elmo Bliss	
1985	The Mean Season	Alan Delour	
1986	The Men's Club	Kramer	
1986	Solarbabies	Grock	
1987	The Secret of My Success	Howard Prescott	
1989	Romero	Fr. Rutilio Grande, SJ	
1990	The Hunt for Red October	Jeffrey Pelt	
1991	Timebomb	Col. Taylor	
1991	Delusion	Executive in Conference Room	
1991	Shout	Eugene Benedict	
1991	Heaven Is a Playground	David Racine	
1992	Primary Motive	Chris Poulas	
1993	Posse	Sheriff Bates	
1993	Gettysburg	Brig. Gen. Lewis A. Armistead	Posthumous release

=== Television ===
Richard Jordan television credits
Year	Title	Role	Notes
1973	Kojak	Steve Macey	Dark Sunday Season 1 Episode 8
1976	Captains and the Kings	Joseph Armagh	8 episodes
1978	The Defection of Simas Kudirka	Commander Edward Devon	TV movie
1978	Les Misérables	Jean Valjean	TV movie
1981	The Bunker	Albert Speer	TV movie
1984	American Playhouse	Elmo Bliss	Episode: "A Flash of Green"
1987	The Murder of Mary Phagan	Hugh Dorsey	2 episodes
1987–1988	The Equalizer	Harley Gage	9 episodes "Mission: McCall" (S3.E6) "Shadow Play" (S3.E8) "Inner View" (S3.E9) "The Rehearsal" (S3.E10) "Christmas Presence" (S3.E11) "A Dance on the Dark Side" (S3.E12) "The Child Broker" (S3.E13) "Video Games" (S3.E14) "Something Green" (S3.E15)
1991	Tales from the Crypt	Charlie McKenzie	Episode: "Deadline"
