= Adam Kennedy (actor) =

American actor and screenwriter

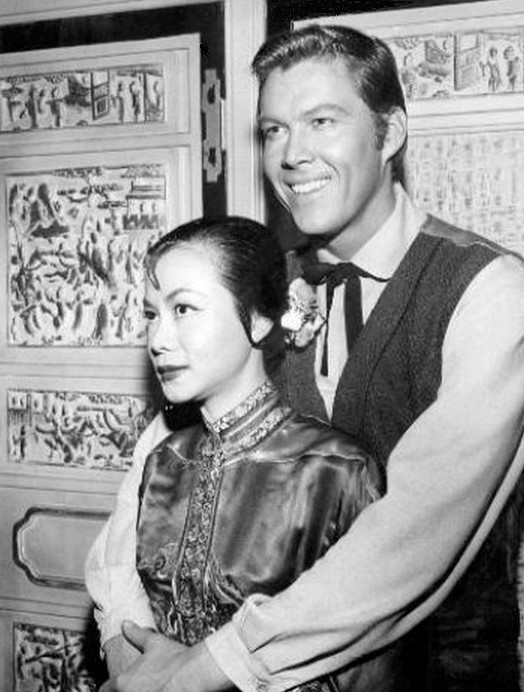
- Kennedy (right) with Maria Tsien in The Californians, 1958
- Born: Jack Kennedy; March 10, 1922; Otterbein, Indiana, U.S.
- Died: October 16, 1997 (aged 75); Kent, Connecticut, U.S.
- Education: DePauw University
- Occupations: Actor, screenwriter
- Spouses: Barbara Curley; Susan Adams
- Children: 2

Jack Kennedy (March 10, 1922 – October 16, 1997) was an American actor and screenwriter. He was known for playing Dion Patrick in the American western television series The Californians.

== Life and career ==
Kennedy was born in Otterbein, Indiana, where he was raised on a farm. He attended DePauw University, from which he graduated in art and English literature. His studies were interrupted by World War II, however, when he served in the United States Army Air Forces. He also studied acting at the Neighborhood Playhouse School of the Theatre.

Kennedy began his career after he emigrated to France, in which he made numerous appearances in stage plays. He made his film debut in 1955, first appearing in the film The Court-Martial of Billy Mitchell. Kennedy then made two appearances to the anthology television series Chevron Hall of Stars. In 1957, he joined the cast of the new NBC western television series The Californians for its first season. Kennedy played as journalist Dion Patrick. While appearing in the first season, the television series had received low ratings for which his character was then removed.

After being removed from the television series, Kennedy played as Pvt. Maslow in the film Men in War and as Lieutenant Ed Simmons in Bailout at 43,000. He guest-starred in television programs including Gunsmoke, Frontier Circus, Schlitz Playhouse of Stars, Lock-Up, and Crossroads. His final film credit was from the 1957 film The Tall Stranger, where he played as Red. He also played as rancher Brock Hayden in the soap opera television series The Doctors. According to The Indianapolis Star, he was considered with an Irish and Swedish descent.

Kennedy wrote the films The Dove and Raise the Titanic. He was a novelist for which his known work included The Domino Principle which was adapted into a 1977 film, directed and produced by Stanley Kramer. According to The San Francisco Examiner, Kennedy said he turned to writing because he no longer had the ego required to pursue an acting career.

== Death ==
Kennedy died on October 16, 1997, of a heart attack at his home in Kent, Connecticut, at the age of 75.
