= Pay or Die =

1960 film by Richard Wilson

- Film poster
- Directed by: Richard Wilson
- Written by: Bertram Millhauser; Richard J. Collins
- Produced by: Richard Wilson
- Starring: Ernest Borgnine
- Cinematography: Lucien Ballard
- Edited by: Walter Hannemann
- Music by: David Raksin
- Distributed by: Allied Artists Pictures
- Release date: July 27, 1960
- Running time: 111 minutes
- Country: United States
- Language: English
- Budget: $900,000
- Box office: $1,500,000 (US/ Canada)

Pay or Die is a 1960 American biographical and crime film directed by Richard Wilson and starring Ernest Borgnine, Zohra Lampert, Howard Caine, Alan Austin, and Robert F. Simon.

The film is a dramatization of the career of New York City police officer Joseph Petrosino, a pioneer in the fight against organized crime in America. The film deals primarily with Petrosino and his Italian Squad's opposition to the extortion rackets of the Black Hand in lower Manhattan's Little Italy.

== Plot ==
The rookie Petrosino convinces the Police Commissioner of New York City to allow him to form a special squad to combat The Black Hand on its own grounds, as success depends on the ability to speak Italian and to convince the ordinary citizens of the tenements that gangsters are not heroes to worship. Petrosino's initial opponent is Lupo Miano, a leading extorntionist. But he soon suspects it runs deeper than Lupo's obvious rackets.

Rather shy socially, Petrosino is astonished to find out that the daughter of a family he assisted, Adelina Saulino, is in love with him, and they are eventually married.

Things come to a head when the Black Hand attempts to extort money from the famous opera singer Enrico Caruso. Petrosino appoints himself the singer's personal bodyguard. After a performance one night, a Black Hand member places a bomb in Caruso's car. Only a forgotten hat saves the singer from the bomb that kills his chauffeur. As the criminal attempts to flee, Petrosino shoots and kills him.

Some time later, a jeweler receives a Black Hand note and notifies Petrosino. Unfortunately, the Black Hand learns about this and coordinates another bomb, this time hidden inside a vegetable cart. The bomb kills the jeweler and several school girls, including the child of a Black Hand member. The bomber survives, and a nun provides enough information for a facial sketch to be made. Following the evidence, Petrosino is lead to the suspected hideout of the bomber. He smuggles himself into the hideout, wrapped up in a giant bale of cotton rags. After a violent fistfight, the bomber is killed as he resists arrest. Di Sarno a member of the Black Hand hangs himself in despair over the loss of his daughter.

Petrosino hits on a new tactic---travel to Italy and see if local gangsters are wanted in Italy and can be deported to face surer justice in their own country. The tactic is successful beyond his wildest dreams, but Petrosino also uncovers evidence of a burgeoning nationwide crime syndicate. A leading Little Italy citizen, Vito Zarillo, is a fugitive wanted in Sicily for double murder. He conveys this message back home by mail, trusting rookie cop Johnny Viscardi to carry on for him if the worst happens.

The day before Petrosino is to return to New York, he is lured to a meeting with a traitorous informant, who reveals himself to be the head of the mafia in Sicily. Petrosino leaves the meeting and is shot down in the street. Back in New York at the funeral home, Viscardi notices Zarillo spit into Petrosino's coffin---all Viscardi needs to arrest a head of the Blackhanders.

== Cast ==
- Ernest Borgnine as Police Lt. Joseph Petrosino
- Zohra Lampert as Adelina Saulino
- Alan Austin as Johnny Viscardi
- Renata Vanni as Mama Saulino
- Bruno Della Santina as Papa Saulino
- Robert F. Simon as Police Commissioner
- Robert Ellenstein as Luigi Di Sarno
- Howard Caine as Enrico Caruso
- Barry Russo as Lupo Miano (as John Duke)
- Vito Scotti as Officer Simonetti
- John Marley as D. Caputo, Ragman
- Delia Nora Salvi as Miss Salvi, Di Sarno's Secretary

== Production ==
Director Richard Wilson had just made the successful crime biopic Al Capone for Allied Artists.

== International titles ==
This film was also released under the following titles:

- La mafia – France
- Maksa tai kuole – Finland
- Pagar o morir – Venezuela
- Pagare o morire – Italy
- To telesigrafo tou thanatou – Greece (transliterated ISO-LATIN-1 title)
- Zahl oder stirb – West Germany

== See also ==
- List of American films of 1960
