= Sahara (2005 film) =

2005 American action-adventure film by Breck Eisner

- Theatrical release poster
- Directed by: Breck Eisner
- Screenplay by: James V. Hart; Thomas Dean Donnelly Joshua Oppenheimer; John C. Richards
- Based on: Sahara by Clive Cussler
- Produced by: Stephanie Austin; Howard Baldwin; Karen Baldwin; Mace Neufeld
- Starring: Matthew McConaughey; Steve Zahn; Penélope Cruz; Lambert Wilson; Glynn Turman; Rainn Wilson; Delroy Lindo; William H. Macy
- Cinematography: Seamus McGarvey
- Edited by: Andrew MacRitchie
- Music by: Clint Mansell
- Production companies: Bristol Bay Productions; Baldwin Entertainment Group; Kanzaman Productions; Mace Neufeld Productions
- Distributed by: Paramount Pictures (North America and select international territories); Buena Vista International; Universum Film (Germany); Summit Entertainment (International)
- Release dates: April 4, 2005 (Hollywood); April 8, 2005 (United States)
- Running time: 124 minutes
- Countries: United Kingdom; Spain; Germany; United States
- Language: English
- Budget: $160 million
- Box office: $119.2 million

Sahara is a 2005 action-adventure film directed by Breck Eisner based on the best-selling 1992 novel of the same name by Clive Cussler. It stars Matthew McConaughey, Steve Zahn and Penélope Cruz, and follows a treasure hunter who partners with a medical doctor to find a lost American Civil War Ironclad warship in the Sahara Desert.

The film was shot in 2003 on-location in Morocco, as well as in the United Kingdom. It became notable for its many production issues, including doubling its production budget from $80 million to $160 million and a series of lawsuits. Sahara grossed $119 million worldwide at the box-office, ultimately failing to recoup all of its costs, and is often listed among the biggest box-office failures of all time. Critical reviews were mixed to negative.

== Plot ==
In 1865, at the conclusion of the American Civil War, Richmond, Virginia is in ruins. The CSS Texas, captained by Mason Tombs is loaded with the last of the Confederacy's gold to keep it from Union forces before disappearing.

In present-day Mali, there is a civil war between dictator General Kazim and Tuareg rebels. In Nigeria, World Health Organization doctors Eva Rojas and Frank Hopper investigate a disease affecting people who have been in Mali. Zakara, a corrupt Tuareg, tries to murder Eva, but she is rescued by Dirk Pitt, from the National Underwater and Marine Agency, who was diving nearby.

Dirk obtains a Confederate gold coin found in the Niger River, a clue to the location of the long-lost Confederate ironclad CSS Texas. He borrows his boss Sandecker's yacht to search for it. He is accompanied by NUMA's Al Giordino and Deputy Director Rudi Gunn. They first transport Eva and Hopper to Mali so they can continue investigating the disease, then continue up the Niger. While taking water samples, they discover red algae, which puzzles them as it is not usually found in fresh water.

Kazim and businessman Yves Massarde try to stop the doctors from discovering the source of the disease. Kazim sends men to attack the yacht. Dirk, Al and Rudi survive, but the yacht is destroyed. Rudi leaves to get help while Dirk and Al go to rescue the doctors.

Kazim's men track down the doctors and kill Hopper. Dirk and Al rescue Eva. As they are trying to leave Mali, they are captured by the Tuareg insurgents. Convincing the group that they are hunted by Kazim, their leader, Modibo, shows Eva his people dying from the disease she is following, which she determines is a waterborne toxin with no available treatment or cure. Al stumbles into a cave with a painting showing the ironclad Texas. Dirk believes that the Texas became stranded when the river dried up and the same river that carried the ship now runs underground.

Following the river bed, they stumble upon Massarde's solar plant, which they discover is the source of the contamination. Meanwhile, Rudi and Sandecker have deduced that chemicals are creating the red algae and seeping slowly towards the Atlantic Ocean, where they will expand rapidly upon entering salt water and kill ocean life worldwide. Despite this, the US government is reluctant to intervene. Dirk, Al and Eva infiltrate the solar power plant on an inbound train. However, Massarde and Zakara capture them, keep Eva, and send Dirk and Al in a truck to Kazim. Dirk and Al escape in the middle of the desert and rebuild a plane wreck into a land yacht; make contact with Sandecker by telephone, they learn of the impending disaster.

Dirk and Al return to the solar plant, with Modibo's help. To cover up the existence of the waste, Massarde plans to destroy it with explosives. Fearing the plant's destruction would guarantee worldwide water contamination, Al goes to remove the explosives while Dirk tries to rescue Eva. Dirk kills Zakara after a fight, but Massarde escapes via helicopter. Al successfully neutralizes the explosives.

The three leave the plant in an Avions Voisin C-28 stolen from Kazim by Modibo; the general pursues them in an attack helicopter, with his army following. A series of explosions along the dry river bed reveals the wreckage of the Texas. The trio hides in the armored ship, but Kazim's helicopter uses armour-piercing ammunition. Using one of the Texas's cannons, they manage to destroy the helicopter, killing Kazim. Modibo arrives with Tuareg reinforcements, forcing Kazim's army to surrender.

The plant is shut down, stopping the source of toxic waste. Sandecker agrees to work covertly for the US government in exchange for NUMA funding. The Texas gold is left with Modibo's people. It is implied that Massarde is poisoned by Carl, an undercover CIA agent, while Dirk and Eva start a relationship.

== Cast ==
- Matthew McConaughey as Dirk Pitt
- Steve Zahn as Al Giordino
- Penélope Cruz as Eva Rojas
- Lambert Wilson as Yves Massarde
- Lennie James as Brigadier General Zateb Kazim
- William H. Macy as Admiral James Sandecker
- Rainn Wilson as Commander Rudi Gunn
- Delroy Lindo as Carl
- Patrick Malahide as Ambassador Polidori
- Glynn Turman as Frank Hopper
- Dayna Cussler as Kitty Mannock (Deleted scenes)
- Robert Cavanah as Captain Tombs
- Paulin Fudouop as Modibo
- Jude Akuwudike as Imam
- Clint Dyer as Oshodi
- Mark Aspinall as Lawyer
- Rakie Ayola as Mrs. Nwokolo
- Christopher Bello as Train Driver
- Nicholas Beveney as Gunboat 1 Officer
- Maurice Lee as Zakara

== Production ==
Principal photography began in November 2003, with the film being shot primarily on-location in Morocco, with portions in England (Hampshire and Shepperton Studios) and in Spain. One 46-second action sequence cost $2 million to film but ended up not making the final cut. McConaughey was paid $8 million, Penélope Cruz was paid $1.6 million, and Rainn Wilson was paid $45,000. A total of 10 screenwriters were used to polish the script, with four eventually receiving credit, which added $3.8 million to the film's budget; David S. Ward made $500,000 for his uncredited work.

== Costs and bribery allegations ==
Initially green-lit with a production budget of $80 million, costs rose to $100 million by the time shooting started and had ballooned to $160 million by the time production wrapped, with a further $61 million in distribution expenses. In 2014, the Los Angeles Times listed the film as one of the most expensive flops of all time.

The Los Angeles Times presented an extensive special report on April 15, 2007, dissecting the budget of Sahara as an example of how Hollywood films can have such large budget yet still be unprofitable. Many of the often closely held documents had been leaked after a lawsuit involving the film. Among items in the Sahara budget were payments to the Moroccan government, some of which may have been legally questionable or bribes under American law.

== Marketing ==
To promote the film, actor Matthew McConaughey drove his own Airstream trailer (painted with a large Sahara movie poster on each side) across America, stopping at military bases and many events such as the Daytona 500 (to Grand Marshal the race), premiering the movie to fans, signing autographs, and doing interviews at each stop. The trip's highlights were shown on an E! channel special to coincide with the film's release. McConaughey also kept a running blog of his trip on MTV's entertainment website.

According to McConaughey, this film was intended to be the first in a franchise based on Clive Cussler's Dirk Pitt novels similarly to James Bond, but the poor box-office performance has stalled plans for a sequel.

== Reception ==
=== Critical response ===
On Rotten Tomatoes, Sahara has an approval rating of 37% based on 175 reviews, with an average rating of 5.2/10. The website's critics consensus reads: "A mindless adventure flick with a preposterous plot." Metacritic assigned the film a weighted average score of 41 out of 100, based on 33 critics, indicating "mixed or average reviews". Audiences polled by CinemaScore gave the film an average grade of "B+" on an A+ to F scale.

Roger Ebert of The Chicago Sun-Times gave Sahara a 3 stars out of 4 review, agreeing the core storyline was ridiculous and derivative but nonetheless enjoying the film's "absurd but entertaining action sequences".

=== Box office ===
The film opened at number one in the US box office, taking $18 million on its first weekend and ultimately grossed $69 million. It earned a further $50 million overseas, for a worldwide total of $119 million. The box-office take of the film amounted to barely half of its overall expenses. The film lost approximately $105 million, according to a financial executive assigned to the movie; however, Hollywood accounting methods assign losses at $78.3 million, taking into account projected revenue. According to Hollywood accounting, the film had a projected revenue of $202.9 million against expenses of $281.2 million.

=== Awards ===
Award	Category	Recipients	Result
BMI Film & TV Awards	Film Music Award	Clint Mansell	Won
Irish Film & Television Awards	Best Cinematography Award	Seamus McGarvey	Won
Teen Choice Awards	Choice Movie Actor: Action/Thriller	Matthew McConaughey	Nominated
Teen Choice Awards	Choice Movie Actress: Action/Thriller	Penélope Cruz	Nominated
Teen Choice Awards	Choice Movie: Liplock	Matthew McConaughey and Penélope Cruz	Nominated

== Legal action ==
For almost a decade, Cussler was involved in a lengthy legal action suit against the film's producer, Philip Anschutz, and his film entertainment company, Crusader Entertainment LLC (now part of the Anschutz Entertainment Group). It began in February 2005 when Cussler sued Anschutz and Crusader for $100 million for failing to consult him on the script. The author also claimed breach of contract because Crusader had failed to take up the option of a second book; Anschutz counter-sued for "alleged blackmail and sabotage attempts against the film prior to its 2005 release." Cussler claimed he had been assured "absolute control" over the book's film adaptation, but when this did not happen, he believed this contributed to its failure at the box office. He said in a statement, "They deceived me right from the beginning. They kept lying to me... and I just got fed up with it." However, Anschutz's company counter-sued, claiming it had been the behavior of Cussler that contributed to the film's problems. They claimed Cussler did have certain approval rights regarding the script and selection of actors and directors, but he had been an obstructive presence, rejecting many screenplay revisions and attacking the film in the media before it was even released. On May 15, 2007, a jury found in Anschutz's favor and awarded him $5 million in damages. On January 8, 2008, Judge John Shook decided that Crusader Entertainment was not required to pay Cussler $8.5 million for rights to the second book. On March 10, 2009, the same judge ordered Cussler to pay $13.9 million in legal fees to the production company.

A year later, in March 2010, the California Court of Appeals overturned Judge Shook's decision to award Anschutz and Crusader $5 million in damages and nearly $14 million in legal fees. Cussler then attempted to restart legal proceedings in July 2010 by filing a new lawsuit in the Los Angeles Superior Court, claiming the appeals court gave him back the right to recover the $8.5 million he believed Crusader owed him on a second book.

In response, the production company's lawyer said, "They're trying to pretend this wasn't already litigated. Cussler has never been able to accept the fact that he lost this case. He didn't accept the jury verdict, then for a year they tried to get the trial court judge to say the jury determined (Cussler was) entitled to $8.5 million and the court said absolutely not. They then sought an appeal and it didn't work. Then they appealed to the California Supreme Court and they didn't take the case. So, despite having had multiple courts say no, they are trying all over again."

There were no further developments in the case for almost three years until December 2012 when both parties were back in court to hear which side was responsible for paying the case's $20 million legal bill. However, the Second Appellate District for California's Appeals Court declared that "there was no prevailing party for purposes of attorney fees." It concluded that "after years of litigation both sides recovered nothing -- not one dime of damages and no declaratory relief."

== See also ==
- Bom Jesus, a ship with treasure found off the African coast in 2008
- CSS Texas (1865), the Ironclad that the film is based on
