= The Domino Principle =

1977 American thriller film by Stanley Kramer

- Theatrical release poster.
- Directed by: Stanley Kramer
- Screenplay by: Adam Kennedy
- Based on: The Domino Principle; 1975 novel by Adam Kennedy
- Produced by: Stanley Kramer
- Starring: Gene Hackman; Candice Bergen; Richard Widmark; Mickey Rooney; Edward Albert; Eli Wallach
- Cinematography: Fred J. Koenekamp; Ernest Laszlo
- Edited by: John F. Burnett
- Music by: Billy Goldenberg
- Production company: ITC Entertainment
- Distributed by: AVCO Embassy Pictures; Lionsgate (United States); ITV Studios Global Entertainment (International)
- Release date: March 23, 1977
- Running time: 97 minutes
- Country: United States
- Language: English
- Budget: $6 million
- Box office: $1.7 million

The Domino Principle is a 1977 American neo-noir thriller film starring Gene Hackman, Candice Bergen, and Richard Widmark. The film is based on the 1975 novel of the same name and was adapted for the screen by its author Adam Kennedy. It was directed and produced by Stanley Kramer.

Kramer wrote in his memoirs that he "wouldn't be surprised" if Hackman, Bergen and Widmark "would prefer to remain as anonymous as the conspirators" in the film, adding "if I'm right, it's a feeling I share."

== Plot ==
Roy Tucker is serving time in San Quentin prison for the murder of his wife's first husband, a murder he did not commit. Warden Ditcher introduces him to a man named Marvin Tagge. Over a series of interviews with Tagge and an associate named Ross Pine, Tucker learns the two men represent a mysterious organization, and Tagge presents him with an offer: in exchange for Tagge helping him escape and start a new life, Tucker must work for the organization for a few weeks. Tucker is initially wary of the offer and confides in his cellmate Oscar Spiventa who warns him that he is being groomed as an expendable hitman by "them", a nameless cabal that runs the country from the shadows. Tucker dismisses Spiventa as paranoid.

In the end, Tucker is unable to resist the prospect of reuniting with his wife Ellie and decides to accept the offer. Spiventa turns down Tucker's invitation to come along during the escape, but changes his mind at the last second. With arrangements made for the prison staff to turn a blind eye, the two convicts are driven out the main gate in a bread delivery truck to a rendezvous point underneath the Golden Gate Bridge. The two organization agents there immediately kill Spiventa and take Tucker to the Hyatt Regency San Francisco hotel, where he meets General Tom Reser, a confederate of Tagge and Pine. Tucker is allowed to enjoy himself in the city before he is taken to his wife. He learns from news broadcasts that Spiventa's body was found and authorities believe he committed the murder and escaped to Canada. He also meets with his lawyer, Arnold Schnaible, only for Schnaible to turn up dead soon afterward.

Tucker is flown to Puntarenas, Costa Rica, where he is given a bank account with $200,000 and a house to share with Ellie, who was led to believe that Tucker had been released from prison pending a new trial. After a few idyllic days, Tagge, Pine, and Reser return the couple to Los Angeles. Tucker is prepared for his task by being directed by Reser to shoot tin cans with a rifle while riding a helicopter with military livery, after which the helicopter does a flyby of a rural estate. He realizes that he is expected to assassinate a politician and tries to back out. The organization retaliates by kidnapping Ellie, and Tucker submits.

The next morning, Tucker shoots the target as planned, though the getaway is marred by the target's security detail damaging the helicopter and mortally wounding the pilot, forcing it to land and be abandoned in the mountains, where it is blown up along with the pilot's body. At a hideout, Tucker takes Pine hostage, demanding a plane and the return of his wife. Tagge complies. At Burbank Airport, Tucker tells Tagge that he deliberately fired short, so he knows someone else killed the target. Tagge reveals that two other shooters were in place, including Spiventa, who is not only still alive but was recruited in 1961; Tucker himself has been manipulated by the organization for over a decade. Tucker asks, "Is it over?", to which Tagge replies that it all depends on the man who gave the original order for the assassination: "If he panics, then the dominoes start to fall."

Aboard the plane with Ellie, Tucker spots someone planting a toolbox in the back of Tagge's car. Unable to get the pilot to abort takeoff, Tucker watches helplessly as Tagge is blown up with his car. The couple return to Costa Rica where Tucker sees his fragile new life dismantled as quickly as it was assembled: his false passport destroyed, his bank account emptied and Ellie run over and killed by a passing truck.

When Spiventa and Pine arrive Tucker shoots them both and dumps their bodies in the ocean. The film closes with a resolute Tucker vowing not to give up as he walks down a beach with a loaded rifle, unaware he is in the crosshairs of yet another assassin.

== Cast ==
- Gene Hackman as Roy Tucker
- Candice Bergen as Elinore "Ellie" Tucker
- Richard Widmark as Marvin Tagge
- Mickey Rooney as Oscar Spiventa
- Edward Albert as Ross Pine
- Eli Wallach as General Tom Reser
- Ken Swofford as Warden William Ditcher
- Neva Patterson as Helen Gaddis
- Jay Novello as Captain Ruiz
- Joseph V. Perry as Bowkemp
- Ted Gehring as Arnold Schnaible
- Majel Barrett as Mrs. Schnaible

== Production ==
=== Development ===
The Domino Principle was based on the sixth novel by former actor Adam Kennedy. New American Library purchased the paperback rights for $250,000 and there was considerable interest in the film rights before publication. The novel came out in 1975. The Los Angeles Times praised the book's "power and originality". The New York Times praised Kennedy as "a fine writer who maintains suspense until the end."

In November 1975, Stanley Kramer announced he had purchased the rights for a reported $250,000. Kramer said the novel "is not only an exciting adventure but also stresses that such things could happen here."

In March 1976, Kramer announced he had signed a deal with Lew Grade to make two films; the first was to be The Domino Principle with Gene Hackman and Candice Bergen, and the second was to be The Sheikhs of Araby, a comedy with Sid Caesar and Don Rickles. The latter film would ultimately never be made.

Kramer said he never identified who hired the assassin or their target because "that is not the point of the picture. The point I tried to make is that there are powerful, undetected forces that affect our destiny without even us suspecting they exist."

=== Filming ===
Filming took place in April and May 1976. On the first day of location filming in San Quentin Prison, a guard was stabbed by an inmate.

Hackman later said, "We had a lot of problems on that film; I had arguments with Stanley Kramer." Hackman later read a published diary written by Kramer during the making of the film which described Hackman's behavior on set. The actor called the diary "embarrassing, but I have to say it was accurate. And he was probably right in his remarks about me. The film we were making just wasn't worth the difficulties I was giving him. The truth is I was in trouble on that film and I got scared."

In December 1976, Bergen said about the film, "thanks to Gene it turned out to be the best part I've ever done. I said, 'I have such a long way to go before I can become that woman, Gene. I just can't do it unless you help me.' He was incredibly generous with his time and energy, his enthusiasm and his outrageous skill. For the first time I took a risk and didn't rely on my looks." However, Bergen later called the film "terrible" and said she only did it "because it gave me the chance to play an ordinary woman. I put on a sappy wig and wore sappy clothes and for once in my life I didn't look like Candice Bergen and they [the critics] creamed me for that, saying I looked like Shelley Winters."

== Reception ==
=== Critical response ===
The film opened to mostly negative reviews and lasted only two to three weeks in theaters, dooming Kramer's first attempt at directing a thriller.

Film critic Vincent Canby of The New York Times stated that the film's plot made no sense, noting that when Hackman's character said "I've done a lot of bad things in my life, but I ain't going to do that," the question of "What is he not going to do?" was neither established nor answered.

The Variety review stated: "The Domino Principle is a weak and tedious potboiler starring Gene Hackman as a tool of mysterious international intrigue, and a barely recognizable Candice Bergen in a brief role as his perplexed wife. Stanley Kramer’s film contains a lot of physical and logistical nonsense."

James Monaco wrote that The Domino Principle doesn't do much but play with paranoia.

=== Box Office ===
According to Lew Grade, who helped finance the film, it "broke even."

"I'm told a lot of people didn't understand it," said Hackman later. "I didn't understand it either."

=== Release ===
The Domino Principle was released in the United States on VHS on January 1, 1998, by Avid Home Entertainment. The film was released on DVD on January 24, 2006, by Lionsgate Home Entertainment.

Recently, international rights to the film are currently owned by ITV Studios Global Entertainment.

== Legacy ==
Stanley Kramer and Kennedy were later going to reunite on an adaptation of Raise the Titanic! for Lew Grade, which replaced Araby as Kramer's second film under his deal with Grade. However Kramer left that project.
