= Margaret T. Cussler =

American sociologist

- Cussler, from the 1931 yearbook of the New York State Teachers College at Albany
- Born: August 25, 1911
- Died: July 15, 1987 (aged 75)
- Occupations: Writer, sociologist, filmmaker, college professor
- Notable work: You Can't Eat Tobacco (1942 film)

Margaret Thekla Cussler (August 25, 1911 – July 15, 1987) was an American writer, sociologist, and college professor. She made three documentary films in the 1940s with Mary L. De Give, and taught sociology at the University of Maryland, College Park, from 1954 into the 1970s.

== Early life and education ==
Cussler was raised in Gansevoort, New York, the daughter of Henry C. Cussler and Margaret King Cussler. Her father was a pastor in Schuylersville, New York. She graduated from the New York State College for Teachers in 1932, and completed doctoral studies at Radcliffe College and Harvard University in 1943, with adviser Carle C. Zimmerman. She also studied at Middlebury College, and at Oxford University.

Cussler was women's tennis champion of Glens Falls in 1930, 1933, and 1934. In 1932, she was named Albany city women's tennis champion.

== Career ==
Cussler taught in Schuylersville, and was head of the English department at Arlington High School in the 1930s. In 1940, she pretended to be a teenager and enrolled in a high school to write about the students' point of view.

During World War II she worked for the National Research Council, studying foodways in the American South. As part of this work she and Mary L. De Give made a short film, You Can't Eat Tobacco (1942). The two women formed a production company, Social Documentary Films, and made two more films, Not By Books Alone (1945) and Hopi Horizons (1946).

Cussler taught sociology at the University of Maryland, College Park, from 1947 to 1951, and from 1954 into the 1970s. She became an assistant professor in 1956 and an associate professor in 1962. In 1959 she won a faculty fellowship to attend the Summer Institute for Social Gerontology. In the 1970s she sued the university for sex bias, unsuccessfully, when the school refused her full professor status, removed her from committees, paid her less than colleagues, and otherwise restricted her career. The State of Maryland, in turn, sued the United States Department of Health, Education, and Welfare for encouraging Cussler's lawsuit and others.

Cussler died from cancer in 1987, at the age of 75. Her papers are in the collection of the Schlesinger Library at Harvard. Her older brother Henry was also a college professor.

== Works ==
=== Journal articles ===
- "The Educational Whirl" (1937, 1938)
- "Emotional Maturity for Teachers" (1939)
- "Alias Sweet 16: An English Teacher's Adventure" (1941)
- "The Innocent Eye" (1942, with Mary L. De Give)
- " The effect of human relations on food habits in the rural southeast" (1942, with Mary L. De Give)
- "Let's Look it in the Eye" (1942, with Mary L. De Give)
- "Foods and nutrition in our rural Southeast" (1942, with Mary L. De Give)
- "Outline of Studies on Food Habits in Rural Southeast" (1943, with Mary L. De Give)
- "Assignment for Tomorrow: Shall we Desert School for Some 'Easy Money'?" (1943)
- "Filmmaking as a Focus of Social Forces in an Indian Tribe" (1946)

=== Books ===
- Not By A Long Shot: Adventures of a Documentary Film Producer (1951)
- ‘Twixt the Cup and the Lip (1952, with Mary L. De Give)
- The Woman Executive (1958)
- Dentists, Patients, and Auxiliaries (1968)

=== Films ===
- You Can't Eat Tobacco (1942)
- Not By Books Alone (1945)
- Hopi Horizons (1946)
