= Dirk Cussler =

American author

- Born: 1961 (age 64–65)
- Education: UC Berkeley
- Occupation: Author
- Parent: Clive Cussler
- Relatives: Dayna Cussler (sister); Teri Cussler (sister)
- Writing career
- Language: English
- Genre: Adventure fiction
- Notable work: Dirk Pitt series
- Website: dirkcussler.com

Dirk Cussler (born 1961) is an American author. He is the son of best selling author Clive Cussler and a co-author of several Dirk Pitt adventure novels, as well as being the namesake of the Pitt character.

== Early life and education ==
Cussler was born in 1961; he has an MBA from Berkeley.

== Career ==
Cussler worked for many years in finance before assisting his father in writing the latest novels in the Dirk Pitt series. Cussler also plays an integral part in the non-profit foundation National Underwater and Marine Agency, which was founded by his father. Cussler is head of the council of NUMA and is also a member of the NUMA's Board of Trustees.

== Bibliography ==
- Black Wind (2004), co-written with Clive Cussler
- Treasure of Khan (2006), co-written with Clive Cussler
- Arctic Drift (2008), co-written with Clive Cussler
- Crescent Dawn (2010), co-written with Clive Cussler
- Poseidon's Arrow (2012), co-written with Clive Cussler
- Havana Storm (2014), co-written with Clive Cussler - New York Times #1 Best Seller (November 2017)
- Odessa Sea (2016), co-written with Clive Cussler
- Celtic Empire (2019), co-written with Clive Cussler - Winner of 2020 Colorado Book Award for Best Mystery
- Clive Cussler's The Devil's Sea (2021)
- Clive Cussler's The Corsican Shadow (2023)
