= The Californians (TV series) =

American Western television series (1957–1959)

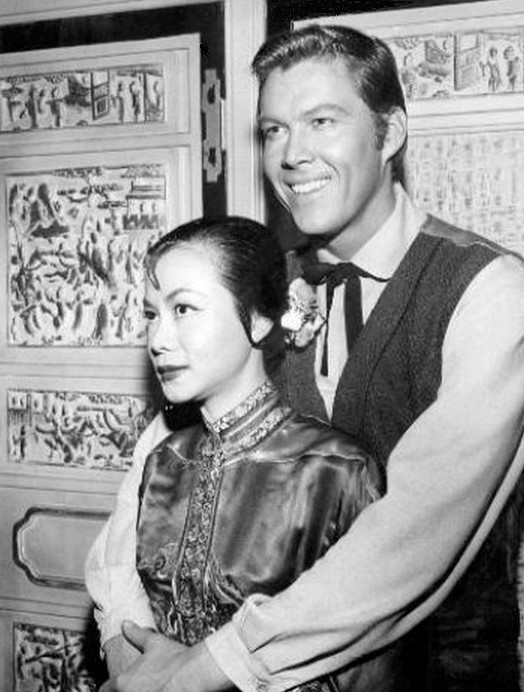
- Adam Kennedy as Dion Patrick with Maria Tsien.
- Starring: Richard Coogan; Art Fleming; Herbert Rudley; Sean McClory; Adam Kennedy; Carole Mathews; Nan Leslie
- Theme music composer: Harry Warren; Harold Adamson
- Opening theme: "I've Come to California"
- Country of origin: United States
- No. of seasons: 2
- No. of episodes: 69

Production
- Running time: 30 minutes
- Production companies: California Film Enterprises; Louis F. Edelman Enterprises

Original release
- Network: NBC
- Release: September 24, 1957 – May 26, 1959

The Californians is an American Western television series, set during the California Gold Rush of the 1850s, which was broadcast by NBC from September 24, 1957 to May 26, 1959, with reruns airing through August 27, 1959.

== Premise ==
The series was set in San Francisco, with episodes focusing on "honest men trying to clean up a wild city overrun by criminals and con men". When episodes began, Sam Brennan owned a newspaper for which Dion Patrick worked as a reporter. Patrick also sought to maintain law and order as a member of a group of vigilantes headed by storekeeper Jack McGivern.

Because the program's sponsors "were uneasy about glorifying vigilantes", the producers changed the characters and cast. In March 1958 Matthew Wayne came to San Francisco. He bought a saloon and soon was elected as the city's sheriff. Wayne became the main character, with McGivern and Patrick being phased out.

The second season began with Wayne as the city marshal, whose efforts were supported by a police department of 50 people. New characters in that season were Wilma Fansler, a widowed young operator of a gambling establishment, and Jeremy Pitt, an attorney who was "friend and foil to the marshal".

== Cast ==
- Dion Patrick - Adam Kennedy
- Jack McGivern - Sean McClory
- Martha McGivern - Nan Leslie
- Sam Brennan - Herbert Rudley
- Matthew Wayne - Richard Coogan
- Schaab - Howard Caine
- Wilma Fansler - Carole Mathews
- Jeremy Pitt - Art Fleming

=== Guest stars ===
- Charles Aidman
- Frank Albertson
- Chris Alcaide
- Fred Aldrich
- John Anderson
- Robert Anderson
- John Archer
- R. G. Armstrong
- Rayford Barnes
- Whit Bissell
- Robert Blake
- Willis Bouchey
- George Brenlin
- Edgar Buchanan
- James T. Callahan
- James Coburn
- Fred Coby
- Mike Connors
- Hans Conried
- Russ Conway
- Bill Coontz
- Robert O. Cornthwaite
- Ted de Corsia
- Robert L. Crawford Jr.
- Richard H. Cutting
- Frank Dekova
- Troy Donahue
- John Doucette
- Douglass Dumbrille
- Duke Fishman
- Douglas Fowley
- Robert Fuller
- Bruce Gordon
- Herman Hack
- Don Haggerty
- James Hong
- Russell Johnson
- Ray Jones
- Allyn Joslyn
- Robert Karnes
- Stacy Keach, Sr.
- Ray Kellogg
- Tommy Kirk
- Gail Kobe
- Michi Kobi
- Ethan Laidlaw
- Lyle Latell
- Keye Luke
- Rod McGaughy
- Patricia Medina
- Don Megowan
- Gerald Mohr
- Jimmy Noel
- Robert Osborne
- J. Pat O'Malley
- Richard Reeves
- Stafford Repp
- Addison Richards
- Stephen Roberts
- Carlos Romero
- Cosmo Sardo
- Vito Scotti
- James Seay
- Alex Sharp
- Quentin Sondergaard
- George Sowards
- Arthur Space
- Bob Steele
- Brick Sullivan
- John Sutton
- George Takei
- Ray Teal
- Joan Tompkins
- Sammee Tong
- Jack Tornek
- Audrey Totter
- Arthur Tovey
- Maria Tsien
- Lurene Tuttle
- Alan Wells
- James Westerfield
- Peter Whitney
- Jean Willes
- Marie Windsor

Stuart Randall

== Episode list ==
=== Season 1: 1957–58 ===
No. overall	No. in season	Title	Original release date
1	1	"The Vigilantes Begin"	September 24, 1957
2	2	"All That Glitters"	October 1, 1957
3	3	"The Noose"	October 8, 1957
4	4	"The Avenger"	October 15, 1957
5	5	"The Search for Lucy Manning"	October 22, 1957
6	6	"The Lost Queue"	October 29, 1957
7	7	"The Regulators"	November 5, 1957
8	8	"Man from Boston"	November 12, 1957
9	9	"The Barber's Boy"	November 19, 1957
10	10	"The Magic Box"	November 26, 1957
11	11	"Little Lost Man"	December 3, 1957
12	12	"Strange Quarantine"	December 10, 1957
13	13	"Truce of the Tree"	December 17, 1957
14	14	"The PO 8"	December 31, 1957
15	15	"The Coward"	January 7, 1958
16	16	"Panic on Montgomery Street"	January 14, 1958
17	17	"China Doll"	January 21, 1958
18	18	"Mr. Valejo"	January 28, 1958
19	19	"The Alice Pritchard Case"	February 4, 1958
20	20	"The Man from Paris"	February 11, 1958
21	21	"The Duel"	February 18, 1958
22	22	"Sorley Boy"	February 25, 1958
23	23	"Gentleman from Philadelphia"	March 4, 1958
24	24	"The Marshal"	March 11, 1958
25	25	"Death by Proxy"	March 18, 1958
26	26	"The Street"	March 25, 1958
27	27	"J. Jimmerson Jones, Inc."	April 1, 1958
28	28	"Skeleton in the Closet"	April 8, 1958
29	29	"Pipeline"	April 22, 1958
30	30	"The Foundling"	April 29, 1958
31	31	"Second Trial"	May 6, 1958
32	32	"The Inner Circle"	May 13, 1958
33	33	"The Golden Bride"	May 20, 1958
34	34	"Murietta"	May 27, 1958
35	35	"Shanghai Queen"	June 3, 1958
36	36	"Bridal Bouquet"	June 10, 1958
37	37	"Golden Grapes"	June 17, 1958

=== Season 2: 1958–59 ===
No. overall	No. in season	Title	Original release date
38	1	"Dishonor for Matt Wayne"	September 23, 1958
39	2	"Mutineers from Hell"	September 30, 1958
40	3	"Lola Montez"	October 7, 1958
41	4	"A Girl Named Sam"	October 14, 1958
42	5	"The Salted Gold Mine"	October 21, 1958
43	6	"Overland Mail"	October 28, 1958
44	7	"Prince of Thieves"	November 11, 1958
45	8	"Hangtown"	November 18, 1958
46	9	"Dangerous Journey"	November 25, 1958
47	10	"Halfway House"	December 2, 1958
48	11	"The Painless Extractionist"	December 9, 1958
49	12	"Old Sea Dog"	December 16, 1958
50	13	"The Long Night"	December 23, 1958
51	14	"The Man Who Owned San Francisco"	December 30, 1958
52	15	"The First Gold Brick"	January 6, 1959
53	16	"The Painted Lady"	January 13, 1959
54	17	"Bella Union"	January 20, 1959
55	18	"Crimps' Meat"	January 27, 1959
56	19	"Corpus Delicti"	February 3, 1959
57	20	"A Turn in the Trail"	February 17, 1959
58	21	"Wolf's Head"	February 24, 1959
59	22	"Cat's Paw"	March 3, 1959
60	23	"Gold-Tooth Charlie"	March 10, 1959
61	24	"Stampede at Misery Flats"	March 17, 1959
62	25	"Guns for King Joseph"	March 24, 1959
63	26	"Deadly Tintype"	March 31, 1959
64	27	"A Hundred Barrels"	April 21, 1959
65	28	"The Fugitive"	April 28, 1959
66	29	"The Fur Story"	May 5, 1959
67	30	"One Ton of Peppercorns"	May 12, 1959
68	31	"The Bell Tolls"	May 19, 1959
69	32	"An Act of Faith"	May 26, 1959

== Production ==
Producer Louis F. Edelman initially offered The Californians to ABC-TV. After that network was unable to obtain sponsors, Edelman offered it to NBC. Robert Bassler was the show's first producer. Felix Feist replaced him in January 1958. The Californians initially was broadcast on Tuesdays from 10 to 10:30 p.m. Eastern Time. In April 1959 it was moved to 9 - 9:30 p.m. E. T. on Tuesdays, and in July 1959 it was moved to Thursdays from 7:30 to 8 p.m. E. T.

The Californians theme song, "I've Come to California", was sung by the Ken Darby Singers. Darby also scored the program.

The Californians had competition from The West Point Story, which was broadcast by the American Broadcasting Company, and The $64,000 Question by CBS. In its second season, the western competed with The Garry Moore Show on CBS and the crime/police reality show Confession, hosted by Jack Wyatt, on ABC.
