= Dayna Cussler =

American actress

- Born: Dayna Gayle Cussler; United States
- Occupations: Film producer, screenwriter, costume designer, actress
- Parent: Clive Cussler
- Relatives: Teri Cussler (sister); Dirk Cussler (brother)

Dayna Gayle Cussler is an American film producer, screenwriter, costume designer, and film actress. She is also the daughter of novelist Clive Cussler.

Cussler has worked on several films starting in 1987, including science fiction productions. Her first films were The Alamo: Thirteen Days to Glory and Barfly, both in 1987. Through the 1990s she worked on numerous film projects, including Philadelphia Experiment II and Hellraiser: Bloodline. In 2000, she produced her first film, 2 on U, which she wrote, produced, and starred in opposite Micky Levy, Tomas Arana, and Tom Novak.

Cussler also played the role of Kitty Mannock in the 2005 film Sahara, an adaptation of her father's novel Sahara, which starred Matthew McConaughey, Penélope Cruz and Steve Zahn. Yet in the final cut of the film her scenes were deleted.

Cussler is a founding member of the Los Angeles theatre ensemble group, GueirrLA Theatre. She appeared in many local productions as an actress.

Cussler was a member of the band The Darklings and currently plays drums with Stations of the Sun. She continues to write, produce, act and make music.
