= Brushfire (film) =

1962 film

Brushfire!
- Original film poster
- Directed by: Jack Warner, Jr.
- Written by: Jack Warner, Jr. Irwin Blacker (story)
- Produced by: Jack Warner, Jr.
- Starring: John Ireland; Everett Sloane; Jo Morrow; Carl Esmond; Howard Caine; Al Avalon; James Hong; Maria Tsien
- Cinematography: Eddie Fitzgerald
- Music by: Irving Gertz
- Distributed by: Paramount Pictures
- Release date: February 1962
- Running time: 80 minutes
- Country: United States
- Language: English

Brushfire! is a 1962 American low budget black-and-white jungle warfare adventure exploitation film produced, directed and co-written by Jack Warner Jr. It was filmed at the time of the beginning of American involvement in Viet Nam and Laos brushfire conflicts.

== Plot ==
Two American World War II veterans Jeff and Chevern reside as planters in an unnamed Southeast Asian nation. They are drawn into a conflict with a group of guerrillas led by Martin and Vlad who have abducted a young American couple Tony and Easter Banford. The two use their jungle fighting expertise and knowledge of the local land to rescue them and wipe out the guerrillas. Jeff states that the rescue effort was worth the high cost in lives because it kept an uprising from developing into a rebellion.

== Cast ==
- John Ireland as Jeff
- Everett Sloane as Chevern
- Carl Esmond as Martin
- Howard Caine as Vlad
- Al Avalon as Tony
- Jo Morrow as Easter
- Maria Tsien as Lin Chan
