= National Underwater and Marine Agency =

American nonprofit organization

The National Underwater and Marine Agency (NUMA) is a private, non-profit organization in the United States founded in 1979.

Originally NUMA was a fictional US government organization in the novels of author Clive Cussler. Cussler later created and led the actual organization until his death in 2020. NUMA has the stated goals of "preserving our maritime heritage through the discovery, archaeological survey and conservation of shipwreck artifacts." The organization reports they do not solicit funding, and most of its operating expenses are paid from royalties on Cussler's books.

== History ==
Clive Cussler founded NUMA as a private non-profit organization in 1979, naming it after a fictional government agency in his series of Dirk Pitt novels. NUMA is involved in underwater archeology and survey.

=== NUMA expeditions ===
NUMA's expeditions tend to focus on ships of American origin from the early 19th to early 20th century, especially on Union and Confederate ships of the American Civil War. NUMA has located or attempted to locate the following vessels and historical artifacts:

- HMS Actaeon
- USS Akron
- CSS Alabama
- Russian frigate Alexander Nevsky, a Russian steam frigate; stranded off Thyborøn in 1868 while carrying Grand Duke Alexei Alexandrovich of Russia
- CSS Arkansas
- SMS Blücher, a German heavy cruiser; sunk at the Battle of Dogger Bank in 1915
- Texan schooner Brutus, a schooner of the Republic of Texas Navy
- USS Bonhomme Richard
- USS Carondelet
- RMS Carpathia
- CSS Chicora
- CSS Charleston
- USS Commodore Jones
- USS Cumberland
- USS Cyclops
- CSS Drewry
- HMS Defence, a British armoured cruiser, sunk during the battle of Jutland
- HMS Endeavour
- CSS Florida
- CSS Fredericksburg
- CSS Gaines
- CSS General Beauregard
- CSS General Lovell
- PS General Slocum
- CSS General Thompson
- CSS Governor Moore
- Stone Fleet
- Greyhound
- HMS Hawke, a first-class British cruiser, sunk by the German U-boat SM U-9 in October 1914
- USS Housatonic
- H. L. Hunley
- HMS Invincible, a British battlecruiser, sunk at the battle of Jutland
- Ivanhoe, a Confederate blockade runner
- CSS Jamestown
- USS Keokuk
- L'Oiseau Blanc ("White Bird"), aircraft flown by Charles Nungesser and François Coli which vanished on an attempted transatlantic flight in 1927
- SS Léopoldville, a Belgian troop transport torpedoed outside Cherbourg in 1944
- Lexington
- Lost Locomotive of Kiowa Creek
- CSS Louisiana
- George Mallory and Andrew Irvine, explorers lost on Mount Everest in 1924
- CSS Manassas
- Mary Celeste
- USS Milwaukee
- USS Mississippi
- New Orleans
- Norseman, a Confederate blockade runner
- Northampton, a Confederate cargo ship
- NWA FLT2501, a Northwest Airlines DC-4 and 58 persons missing in Lake Michigan since 1950
- Odin, a Royal Swedish steamship that ran aground off Jutland in 1836 with the Swedish prime minister on board
- USS Osage
- CSS Palmetto State
- USS Patapsco
- HMS Pathfinder, a British scout cruiser
- USS Philippe
- Platte Valley
- Raccoon, a Confederate blockade runner
- Rattlesnake, a Confederate blockade runner
- HMS Resolution
- CSS Richmond
- Ruby, a Confederate blockade runner
- SMS S35, a German destroyer sunk during the battle of Jutland
- Saint Patrick, a Confederate blockade runner
- SS Savannah, the first steamship to cross the Atlantic Ocean
- HMS Shark, a British destroyer sunk during the battle of Jutland
- Stonewall Jackson, a Confederate blockade runner
- Sultana, the worst ship disaster in number of lives lost in North America
- Swamp Angel, the cannon that fired during the American Civil War on Charleston, South Carolina before exploding
- Torpedo Raft
- Twin Sisters, a pair of six-pounder cannons used against General Antonio López de Santa Anna in the battle of San Jacinto
- SM U-12, sunk by HMS Ariel in 1915
- SM U-20, a German U-boat that sank the ocean liner RMS Lusitania in 1915; ran aground on the Jutland coast in 1916, abandoned by crew and blown up by the Danish government in 1925
- SM U-21, a German U-boat, sank in 1919
- SMS V48, a German destroyer sunk during the Battle of Jutland
- USS Varuna
- CSS Virginia
- CSS Virginia II
- Virginia Navy Fleet, sunk by Benedict Arnold during the American Revolutionary War
- SS Waratah
- USS Weehawken
- SMS Wiesbaden, a German light cruiser sunk off Jutland
- Texan schooner Zavala, a steamer in the Republic of Texas Navy

== Trustees ==
The NUMA Advisory Board of Trustees:

- Clive Cussler, chairman (deceased)
- Dirk Cussler, resident
- Colonel Walter Schob
- Dana Larson
- Admiral William Thompson (deceased)
- William Shea (deceased)
- Michael Hogan
- Harold Edgerton (deceased)
- Clyde Smith
- Don Walsh (deceased)
- Peter Throckmorton (deceased)
- Tony Bell
- Douglas Wheeler
- Wayne Gronquist
- Craig Dirgo
- Ralph Wilbanks

== The fictional NUMA ==
In the Dirk Pitt series of adventure novels by Clive Cussler that debuted in 1973 with The Mediterranean Caper novel, NUMA is a government organization. The fictional agency is devoted to oceanic exploration and investigation, and employs the main characters in the series of books. Its headquarters is a 30-story building located on the east bank of the Potomac River, overlooking the Capitol building in Washington, D.C. The agency comprises over five thousand employees and scientists that often work around the clock on expeditions. It is often referred to as a marine version of NASA or the National Oceanic and Atmospheric Administration (NOAA), an American scientific agency focused on the conditions of the oceans and the atmosphere, and has research vessels that conduct many missions that are similar to the actual NUMA.

The fictional NUMA is headed by the character Admiral James Sandecker, with Rudi Gunn as second in command, although Dirk Pitt is eventually asked to take over when Sandecker pursues the vice presidency.

Housed inside this headquarters is one of the world's most advanced computer systems which contains almost every known piece of information, both current and ancient, about the sea. The computer center takes up the entire tenth floor but is in an "open" setting with a raised circular platform that uses a hologram to display an artificial intelligence designed by Hiram Yeager, named Max, at its center. There are no cubicles. Yeager designed, runs, and maintains the computer lab.

== The Sea Hunters ==
Cussler and NUMA have helped produce a television series on underwater exploration called The Sea Hunters, which chronicles the discovery and subsequent removal and conservation of the CSS H. L. Hunley in 1995. The show also features a number of other shipwrecks in various international locations, and on occasion the failure to find anything at all, such as their attempts to find the Holland III prototype submarine.

The show features Cussler and James Delgado, who is also an author and executive director of the Vancouver Maritime Museum. The show gives an in-depth explanation of the story of the shipwreck NUMA is exploring, including information about the ship's history and how it sank.

Two books titled The Sea Hunters were authored by Clive Cussler about NUMA's explorations.
