= Sea Hunters =

Sea Hunter, Sea Hunters, Seahunter, or, Seahunters, may refer to:

== Clive Cussler franchise ==
- The Sea Hunters: True Adventures with Famous Shipwrecks, a 1996 nonfiction book by Clive Cussler, and a National Geographic Channel documentary TV adaptation
- The Sea Hunters II, a 2002 nonfiction book by Clive Cussler

== Military ==
- Sea Hunter-class USV, a U.S. DARPA medium uncrewed surface vessel drone ship class; see Sea Hunter
- USV Sea Hunter, a Sea Hunter-class U.S. Navy uncrewed surface vessel
- Chinese "Sea Hunter", a Chinese uncrewed surface vessel drone ship technology demonstrator similar to the U.S. DARPA ship
- Contraves Seahunter, a British anti-submarine warfare system found on the Alvand-class frigate
- Seahunter, a U.S. Navy helicopter squadron; see List of United States Navy aircraft squadrons
- SEAHUNTER, a training course at the U.S. Naval Aviation Warfighting Development Center

== Other uses ==
- fisherman, especially spear and bow hunting ones who hunt in the sea, seashore

== See also ==
- Interim SeaHunter, a United States Customs and Border Protection patrol vessel
- Wimpy Seahunter, an offshore supply vessel; see List of ship launches in 1982
- Outlaw SeaHunter, a drone UAV unmanned aircraft
- Hunter (disambiguation)
- Sea (disambiguation)
