= Frank K. M. Rehn Galleries =

American art gallery in New York City

- Founded: November 1918
- Founder: Frank K. M. Rehn
- Dissolved: 1981
- Type: Commercial art gallery
- Location: New York City, United States
- Key people: Frank K. M. Rehn, John C. Clancy
- Formerly called: Galleries of Frank K. M. Rehn

The Frank K. M. Rehn Galleries, also known in its last decades as the Rehn Galleries, was an art gallery in New York City that dealt in American painting from 1918 until 1981. It represented artists such as Edward Hopper, Charles Burchfield and Reginald Marsh, in several cases for their entire careers, and gave Hopper and Franklin C. Watkins their first one-man shows, in 1924 and 1934.

== History ==
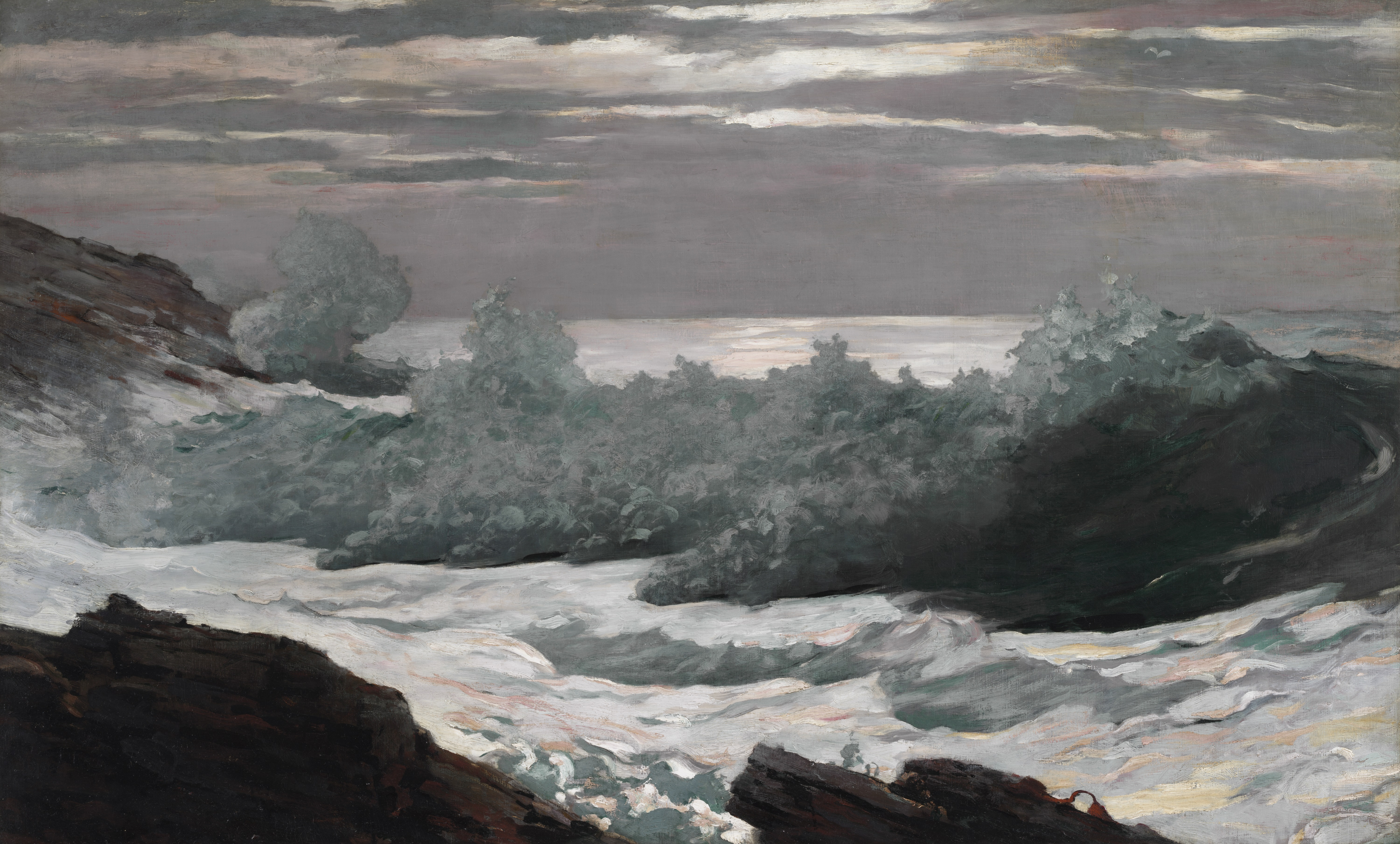
Homer's Early Morning After a Storm at Sea, sold 1924

=== Private gallery, 1918 to 1923 ===
Frank K. M. Rehn (1886-1956) was born in New York City and educated at public and private schools there. He was the son of the marine painter Frank Knox Morton Rehn (1848-1914), a member of the National Academy of Design, and was sometimes called Frank K. M. Rehn Jr. to distinguish him from his father. He worked for the Milch Galleries and as exhibition manager for the Salmagundi Club before opening his own gallery according to differing accounts in between 1918 and 1923.

For its first five years the business was a private gallery at 6 West 50th Street. Rehn's early material included established figures of the previous generation, among them J. Alden Weir, George Inness, Alexander Wyant, Theodore Robinson, Thomas Dewing and John H. Twachtman, Childe Hassam, with occasional works by Robert Henri, George Luks and John Singer Sargent. Hassam was the most popular of them. Early buyers included Duncan Phillips, John Gellatly, John T. Spaulding, Albert McVitty, E. W. Root and C. Vanderbilt Barton. Rehn later represented the Woodstock painters and a Boston group, together with George Bellows, Leon Kroll, Eugene Speicher, the sculptor Mahonri Young, Robert W. Chanler, Gari Melchers and the then little known Hopper.

=== Fifth Avenue, 1923 to 1960 ===
In 1923 the gallery moved to 693 Fifth Avenue, sharing a building with Kennedy and Company and the Bourgeois Galleries, and took on an assistant, John C. Clancy (1897-1981), formerly of Henry Reinhardt and Son and M. Knoedler. In 1930 the gallery moved to the Air France Building at 683 Fifth Avenue, between 53rd and 54th Streets, where it stayed for thirty years. The firm operated under three names in succession: the Galleries of Frank K. M. Rehn in its earliest years, the Frank K. M. Rehn Galleries from the mid 1920s to the mid 1940s, and the Rehn Galleries from about 1946. Clancy later operated under further variants, including Rehn Gallery and Frank Rehn Gallery. The Cleveland Museum of Art recorded the seller of a 1924 purchase as Frank Rehn, Inc.

=== Under John Clancy, 1960 to 1981 ===
Clancy became gallery director in 1953, after a stroke left Rehn unable to run the business, and later bought the gallery from Rehn's widow. Rehn died at his home on 4 March 1956, aged 69. In October 1960 the firm left Fifth Avenue for 36 East 61st Street. In 1966 it took over the Madison Avenue space that the Kootz Gallery gave up when Samuel Kootz closed his business, and stayed there for its last fifteen years. Records give that address as 855 Madison Avenue; a 1970 review placed the gallery at 655 Madison Avenue, at 60th Street.

Clancy received the President's Distinguished Service Award and an honorary diploma from the Charles Burchfield Center at Buffalo State College in 1974. The gallery closed in 1981, the year of his death.

== Artists ==
Rehn dealt almost entirely in American painting, showing drawings and prints mostly by painters. The exceptions were Mahonri Young and Henry Varnum Poor, known for ceramics as well as painting. Hopper first consigned prints to Rehn in 1921, and the dealer represented him for the rest of his career. Marsh joined in 1930. The gallery also handled women painters and ceramic artists, among them Peggy Bacon, Felicia Meyer Marsh, Elizabeth Sparhawk-Jones and Virginia Cuthbert, and in its later years Jane Armstrong, Isabel Case Borgatta and Patricia Mangione.

A group portrait of the stable taken by Peter A. Juley & Son in 1945 shows Rehn seated with George Picken, Speicher and Alexander Brook, and Clancy standing among Henry Mattson, Hopper, Marsh, Peppino Mangravite, Watkins, Morris Kantor, John Carroll, Bradley Walker Tomlin, Burchfield and Poor.

Painters represented over the gallery's life included:

- Milton Avery
- Peggy Bacon
- George Bellows
- Alexander Brook
- Charles Burchfield
- John F. Carlson
- John Wesley Carroll
- Howard Cook
- Jon Corbino
- Virginia Cuthbert
- Andrew Dasburg
- Sidney Gross
- Edward Hopper
- Alexander James
- Irving Kaufmann
- Yeffe Kimball
- Leon Kroll
- Peppino Mangravite
- Felicia Meyer Marsh
- Reginald Marsh
- Henry Mattson
- Henry Lee McFee
- Kenneth Hayes Miller
- Robert Riggs
- Charles Rosen
- Alexander Russo
- Elizabeth Sparhawk-Jones
- Eugene Speicher
- Henry Strater
- Richard Derby Tucker
- Franklin C. Watkins
- Denny Winters

== Selected exhibitions ==
Hopper's Nighthawks, sold 1942

Exhibitions were drawn almost entirely from the gallery's own artists, group shows surveying the stable alternating with a season of one-man exhibitions.

- 1924: Recent Watercolors by Edward Hopper, October. Eleven watercolours, mostly Gloucester scenes and houses. Hopper's first one-man show in a commercial gallery; it sold out, as did five further pictures added during the run.
- 1926: Today in American Art, to 16 March. Included Rockwell Kent, Hopper's Sunday, McFee's A Young Man, Speicher's Carmaline, Luks, Melchers's Bouquet and William Glackens.
- 1928: Milton Avery: Watercolors.
- 1929: Hopper, January. Twelve oils, ten watercolours and a group of drawings; he had also shown in February 1927.
- 1929: All figure show, May. Included Ernest Fiene, Allen Tucker, Jan Matulka, Bernard Karfiol, Hopper, Kroll, Henri, Luks and James Chapin's Ruby Green Singing.
- 1930: Opening exhibition at 683 Fifth Avenue, October. New work by most of the gallery's regulars, including Carroll's Two Figures, Hopper's Church, South Truro, Marsh's Merry-go-round and Speicher's Lilya, lent back by the Cincinnati Museum Association.
- 1932: Marsh, to 12 March. Included Tuesday Night, Savoy Ballroom, Moving Carousel and Holy Name Mission.
- 1934: Watkins, 16 April to 5 May. Twenty five works; his first one-man exhibition. He showed again in 1935, with designs for the ballet Transcendence, and in 1942 and 1948.
- 1936: Burchfield and Bacon, November. Twelve recent watercolours by Burchfield and a group of prints by Bacon
- 1955: Summer group show, July. Twenty artists, including Marsh's Belles of the Battery, Mattson, Kantor's Picnic, Vincent Campanella's Spruce Rhythm, Poor and Watkins.
- 1960: The Early Years: 1923-1940, October. Twenty works borrowed back to mark the move to 36 East 61st Street, among them Hopper's South Truro Church, Kantor's Farewell to Union Square and Marsh's Alma Mater.
- 1961: Burchfield, January. Nine watercolours, his first exhibition since his 1956 retrospective at the Whitney Museum of American Art. John Canaday read it as a return to the personal symbolism of his earliest work, centred on The Four Seasons.
- 1970: Marsh, March. Eleven paintings and ten drawings.

Works from Clancy and Rehn Gallery Collections, drawn from the holdings of Mr and Mrs John Clancy and of the gallery, was shown at the Burchfield Penney Art Center in Buffalo from 29 June to 2 November 1969.

== Selected sales to museums ==
Sales recorded by the buying institution include:

- Winslow Homer, Early Morning After a Storm at Sea, consigned by C. Vanderbilt Barton in 1918 and sold to the Cleveland Museum of Art in 1924.
- Hopper, Highland Light, sold to the Fogg Museum in 1930 through the Louise E. Bettens Fund.
- Burchfield, Winter Bouquet, bought by the Museum of Fine Arts, Boston, reported 1934.
- Speicher, Head of Joyce, bought by the John Herron Art Institute, Indianapolis, reported 1934.
- Burchfield, November Evening, bought by the Metropolitan Museum of Art, reported 1934.
- Hopper, Nighthawks, consigned by the artist in 1942 and sold to the Art Institute of Chicago the same year.

== Archives ==
The Archives of American Art holds 21.8 linear feet of gallery records dated 1858 to 1969, the bulk from 1919 to 1968. Most is business correspondence with collectors, artists, museums and colleagues, fullest for the period from the end of 1918 through 1927. The rest is financial records, including insurance schedules listing paintings by title, artist and value, together with scrapbooks, printed matter and photographs. Clancy lent the material for microfilming in 1959 and gave it outright in 1966, adding further records in 1978 and 1981. The Whitney Museum of American Art transferred correspondence with Hopper in 1985. A death mask of Luks that came with the collection is on extended loan to the National Portrait Gallery. The records occupy microfilm reels 5849 to 5872 and have been digitized in full, at 35,398 images, with funding from the Terra Foundation for American Art. Paul Cummings interviewed Clancy for the Archives on 10 July 1970.

The Burchfield Penney Art Center in Buffalo holds forty five linear feet of records dating from about 1924 to 1981, given because of Burchfield's long association with both Rehn and Clancy. The holding contains photographs, business files, correspondence and exhibition publications, with letters from Burchfield, Carroll, DeWitt Hardy, Hopper, Marsh, Speicher and Strater. Individual items include Clancy's 1974 diploma, an exhibition flyer signed by Burchfield, the 1945 group portrait, an unpublished Hopper biography, an inventory of Hopper's work dated 27 October 1953, and Christmas cards sent by the Hoppers to the Clancys. Clancy gave part of the material in 1975.
