= List of The New York Times number-one books of 2005 =

The American daily newspaper The New York Times publishes multiple weekly lists ranking the best selling books in the United States. The lists are split into three genres—fiction, nonfiction and children's books. Both the fiction and nonfiction lists are further split into multiple lists.

== Fiction ==
The following list ranks the number-one best selling fiction books, in the hardcover fiction category.

The most frequent weekly best seller of the year was The Da Vinci Code by Dan Brown with 7 weeks at the top of the list, followed closely by The Broker by John Grisham with 5 weeks.

Date	Book	Author
January 2	The Five People You Meet in Heaven	Mitch Albom
January 9	The Da Vinci Code	Dan Brown
January 16	The Da Vinci Code	Dan Brown
January 23	The Da Vinci Code	Dan Brown
January 30	The Broker	John Grisham
February 6	The Broker	John Grisham
February 13	The Broker	John Grisham
February 20	The Broker	John Grisham
February 27	The Broker	John Grisham
March 6	Honeymoon	James Patterson and Howard Roughan
March 13	Honeymoon	James Patterson and Howard Roughan
March 20	Honeymoon	James Patterson and Howard Roughan
March 27	Honeymoon	James Patterson and Howard Roughan
April 3	The Rising	Tim LaHaye and Jerry B. Jenkins
April 10	The Da Vinci Code	Dan Brown
April 17	The Da Vinci Code	Dan Brown
April 24	No Place Like Home	Mary Higgins Clark
May 1	True Believer	Nicholas Sparks
May 8	True Believer	Nicholas Sparks
May 15	True Believer	Nicholas Sparks
May 22	4th of July	James Patterson and Maxine Paetro
May 29	4th of July	James Patterson and Maxine Paetro
June 5	The Closers	Michael Connelly
June 12	4th of July	James Patterson and Maxine Paetro
June 19	4th of July	James Patterson and Maxine Paetro
June 26	The Mermaid Chair	Sue Monk Kidd
July 3	The Historian	Elizabeth Kostova
July 10	Eleven on Top	Janet Evanovich
July 17	Eleven on Top	Janet Evanovich
July 24	Eleven on Top	Janet Evanovich
July 31	Lifeguard	James Patterson and Andrew Gross
August 7	Lifeguard	James Patterson and Andrew Gross
August 14	Lifeguard	James Patterson and Andrew Gross
August 21	Lifeguard	James Patterson and Andrew Gross
August 28	The Da Vinci Code	Dan Brown
September 4	Chill Factor	Sandra Brown
September 11	Point Blank	Catherine Coulter
September 18	Polar Shift	Clive Cussler and Paul Kemprecos
September 25	Polar Shift	Clive Cussler and Paul Kemprecos
October 2	The Da Vinci Code	Dan Brown
October 9	Anansi Boys	Neil Gaiman
October 16	A Breath of Snow and Ashes	Diana Gabaldon
October 23	The Lincoln Lawyer	Michael Connelly
October 30	Knife of Dreams	Robert Jordan
November 6	At First Sight	Nicholas Sparks
November 13	Predator	Patricia Cornwell
November 20	Predator	Patricia Cornwell
November 27	A Feast for Crows	George R. R. Martin
December 4	Mary, Mary	James Patterson
December 11	Mary, Mary	James Patterson
December 18	Mary, Mary	James Patterson
December 25	"S" Is for Silence	Sue Grafton

== Nonfiction ==
The following list ranks the number-one best selling nonfiction books, in the hardcover nonfiction category.

Date	Book	Author
January 2	America: The Book	Jon Stewart and The Daily Show writers
January 9	America: The Book	Jon Stewart and The Daily Show writers
January 16	America: The Book	Jon Stewart and The Daily Show writers
January 23	Witness	Amber Frey
January 30	Witness	Amber Frey
February 6	Blink	Malcolm Gladwell
February 13	Blink	Malcolm Gladwell
February 20	Blink	Malcolm Gladwell
February 27	Blink	Malcolm Gladwell
March 6	Juiced	Jose Canseco
March 13	Blink	Malcolm Gladwell
March 20	Blood Brother	Anne Bird
March 27	Blood Brother	Anne Bird
April 3	A Deadly Game	Catherine Crier with Cole Thompson
April 10	Blink	Malcolm Gladwell
April 17	Blink	Malcolm Gladwell
April 24	My Life So Far	Jane Fonda
May 1	My Life So Far	Jane Fonda
May 8	My Life So Far	Jane Fonda
May 15	The World Is Flat	Thomas Friedman
May 22	The World Is Flat	Thomas Friedman
May 29	The World Is Flat	Thomas Friedman
June 5	On Bullshit	Harry Frankfurt
June 12	1776	David McCullough
June 19	1776	David McCullough
June 26	1776	David McCullough
July 3	1776	David McCullough
July 10	1776	David McCullough
July 17	1776	David McCullough
July 24	1776	David McCullough
July 31	1776	David McCullough
August 7	1776	David McCullough
August 14	1776	David McCullough
August 21	The FairTax Book	Neal Boortz and John Linder
August 28	The FairTax Book	Neal Boortz and John Linder
September 4	1776	David McCullough
September 11	1776	David McCullough
September 18	The World Is Flat	Thomas Friedman
September 25	The World Is Flat	Thomas Friedman
October 2	The World Is Flat	Thomas Friedman
October 9	The World Is Flat	Thomas Friedman
October 16	The City of Falling Angels	John Berendt
October 23	The City of Falling Angels	John Berendt
October 30	The World Is Flat	Thomas Friedman
November 6	The World Is Flat	Thomas Friedman
November 13	The Truth (with jokes)	Al Franken
November 20	Our Endangered Values	Jimmy Carter
November 27	Our Endangered Values	Jimmy Carter
December 4	Teacher Man	Frank McCourt
December 11	Our Endangered Values	Jimmy Carter
December 18	Teacher Man	Frank McCourt
December 25	Teacher Man	Frank McCourt

== See also ==
- Publishers Weekly list of bestselling novels in the United States in the 2000s
