= Boyd Morrison =

American writer

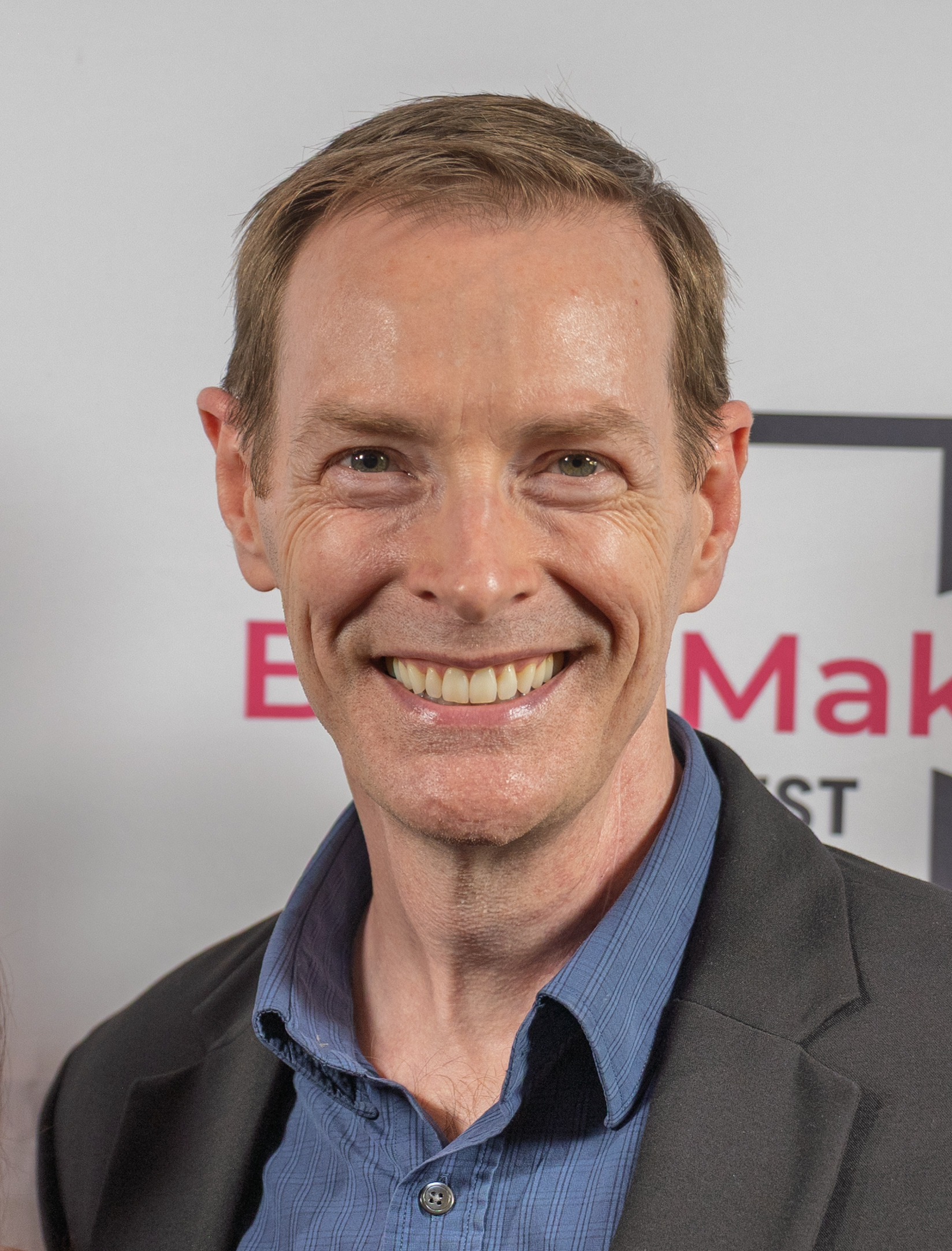
- Morrison at the BraveMaker Film Festival in 2026
- Occupation: Novelist
- Writing career
- Period: 2010-
- Genre: Thriller
- Website: boydmorrison.com

Boyd Morrison (born February 17, 1967) is an American novelist, engineer and actor. Morrison began his career as an engineer, before self-publishing his first novel and later being picked up by Simon and Schuster.

He has written at least 4 solo novels, including The Noah's Ark Quest and The Vault, as well as co-authoring 5 books with Clive Cussler and several books with his sister Beth Morrison.

== Education ==
Boyd Morrison earned a bachelor's degree in mechanical engineering from Rice University and a PhD from Virginia Tech in industrial engineering.

== Career ==
After graduating from Rice University, Morrison joined Lockheed working on the Space Station Freedom project at Lyndon B. Johnson Space Center. He left NASA to get his PhD in industrial engineering from Virginia Tech.

Morrison moved to Seattle and went to work for Microsoft in the Xbox games group. Among his credits are PC and Xbox games, including Project Gotham, Racing 2, Flight Simulator 2004, and Forza Motorsport. Morrison left Microsoft in 2005 to write full-time.

Morrison's first book The Noah's Ark Quest (The Ark) was self published and later published by Simon and Schuster. The Ark (The Noah's Ark Quest) has been translated into 22 languages, was selected for IndieBound's Indie Next list in May 2010, and became a top 15 bestseller in the UK.

Morrison has also written 6 books and co-authored 5 with Clive Cussler and another 4 with his sister, Beth Morrison.

== Critical reception ==
Of his 2011 book, The Vault, the The Free Lance-Star said "it reads like a faster-paced, grittier version of the movie "National Treasure" and, of Morrison, who self-published his first books, "his unflagging determination seems to mirror that of his characters."

In 2015, writing about Morrison's first collaboration with Clive Cussler, Jeff Ayers of the Associated Press said "Piranha, the latest in the Oregon Files series... has a new co-author, Boyd Morrison, and proves to be the best entry to the series to date."

In 2022, The New York Times Book Review said, of the novel The Lawless Land by Boyd and Beth Morrison based in the 14th century, it had "the occasional jolt of inappropriately modern chat... that's best ignored while surrendering to the inventive twists and turns of a satisfyingly bustling plot."

== Works ==
=== Tales of the Lawless Land ===
Boyd Morrison co-authors this series with sister Beth Morrison, an expert in medieval manuscripts at the J. Paul Getty Museum.

#	Title	Publication Date
1	The Lawless Land	2022
2	The Last True Templar	2023
3	The White Fortress	2025
4	Duel of Beasts	2026

=== The Oregon Files (Juan Cabrillo Series) ===
Morrison co-authors part of The Oregon Files series with Clive Cussler.

#	Title	Publication Date
1	Piranha	2015
2	The Emperor's Revenge	2016
3	Typhoon Fury	2017
4	Shadow Tyrants	2018
5	Final Option	2020
6	Marauder	2020

=== Tyler Locke Adventures ===
#	Title	Publication Date
1	The Noah's Ark Quest (The Ark)	2010
2	The Midas Code (The Vault)	2011
3	The Roswell Conspiracy	2012
4	The Loch Ness Legacy	2013

=== Stand Alone Novels ===
#	Title	Publication Date
1	The Tsunami Countdown (Rogue Wave)	2010
2	Substance (The Catalyst)	2011
