= Josephine Hopper =

American painter and model

- Self-portrait
- Born: Josephine Verstille Nivison; March 18, 1883; Manhattan, New York City, New York, U.S.
- Died: March 6, 1968 (aged 84)
- Education: Hunter College
- Known for: Painting
- Spouse: Edward Hopper (m. 1924; died 1967)

Josephine "Jo" Verstille Hopper (née Nivison; March 18, 1883 – March 6, 1968) was an American painter and the wife of painter Edward Hopper. She studied under Robert Henri and Kenneth Hayes Miller, and won the Huntington Hartford Foundation fellowship.

== Life and career ==
Born in Manhattan to Eldorado Nivison, a pianist and music teacher, and Mary Ann Nivison (née McGrath), Josephine was the second-born child, but her elder sibling had died in childhood sometime after 1883. Her younger brother Charles was born in 1884. Later in life she recounted that her father had practically no paternal instincts, and the family's existence was always troubled. The Nivisons moved frequently, although remaining in New York City.

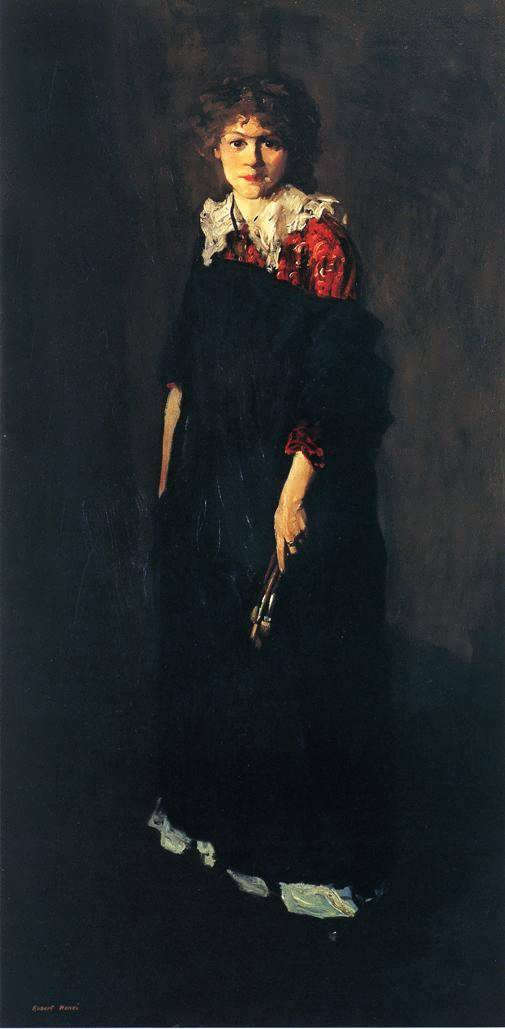
The Art Student, 1906. Portrait of Miss Josephine Nivision, by Robert Henri

In 1900, Jo enrolled in the Normal College of the City of New York (now Hunter College), a free teacher-training school for young women. She received a Bachelor of Arts degree in 1904 and decided to study art and eventually try to become an artist—already at college she started drawing and performing in productions of the drama club there. In late 1905 at the New York School of Art she met Robert Henri, who soon asked her to pose for a portrait (The Art Student, 1906). In February 1906, Nivison began her career as public school teacher. During the next decade she earned her living by teaching, but never abandoned art and remained in touch with Henri and many other artists; in 1907, she traveled to Europe with Henri and some of his students. By 1915, she joined the Washington Square Players as an actress and performed in their productions. During the summers, she frequented various New England art colonies.

By 1918, she was seeking a change of scene and a new job. She unsuccessfully applied for a job with the Red Cross, seeking to go abroad again. World War I had not yet ended, and she signed up to do hospital work overseas. Taking a leave of absence from the New York City public schools, Jo left in late 1918 only to return in January 1919, ill with bronchitis. She was discharged by the Surgeon General in June, and discovered that she had lost her teaching position. Penniless and homeless, she found temporary shelter thanks to an old sexton at the Church of the Ascension who had helped her after seeing her weeping in the church. It was not until a year later that she won the right for another job from the Board of Education; after that, she continued teaching and pursuing a career in art.

She first met her future husband, Edward Hopper, in art school, and then again in 1914 in Ogunquit, where they were staying in the same boarding house. However, their friendship apparently only began some years later. Their relationship became much closer during the summer of 1923, when they were both living in an art colony in Gloucester, Massachusetts. After a courtship that lasted for about a year, the couple married on July 9, 1924. They remained together until Edward Hopper died in 1967. Jo modeled for the figures in most of her husband's paintings after 1924. Edward Hopper only produced one oil painting of his wife (Jo Painting, 1936), but frequently made watercolors, drawings and caricatures of her. Throughout her married life, Jo kept extensive diaries that recounted her life with Edward and his creative process. These diaries also reveal that the marriage was troubled; the couple had frequent rows that sometimes escalated into actual fighting. Twenty-two of Josephine Hopper's diaries are in the collection of the Provincetown Art Association and Museum in Provincetown, MA.

As Edward Hopper's career soared soon after the marriage and his reputation continued to grow, Jo's artistic career waned after the 1920s. This was in part because "Jo poured her considerable energies into tending and nurturing her husband's work, handling loan requests and needling him into painting." She participated in a few group exhibitions (the biggest was organized by Herman Gulack in 1958 at the Greenwich Gallery), and she won the Huntington Hartford Foundation fellowship in 1957.

== Legacy ==
After her husband died in 1967, Jo bequeathed her entire artistic estate (and that of her husband) to the Whitney Museum of American Art.

For a long time it was thought that the museum had discarded most of her work. In 2000, the writer Elizabeth Thompson Colleary discovered about 200 Jo Hoppers in the Whitney's basement. Colleary says Jo was an "uneven" artist, but in general she thinks the work is good: "I said to myself, 'I will not resurrect this woman solely on the basis of the fact that Edward Hopper was her husband'." A few more works are known from photographs Jo made, as reproduced in Levin.

Additional works by Josephine Nivison Hopper have continued to surface, as reported by Elizabeth Thompson Colleary. Jo's watercolors were exhibited at the Edward Hopper House Art Center, Nyack, NY, in 2014 and a few examples were included in an exhibition of "Edward Hopper as Illustrator" at the Norman Rockwell Museum in Stockbridge, Massachusetts, also in 2014. In 2016, the Provincetown Art Association and Museum, Provincetown, Massachusetts, announced that 69 drawings and watercolors by Jo Hopper were included in the gift of Laurence C. and J. Anton Schiffenhaus, along with 96 drawings by Edward Hopper. An exhibition of these works, "Edward and Josephine Hopper from the Permanent Collection: drawings, diaries, letters, watercolors," opened in August 2017. The exhibition was extended "due to the overwhelming interest by scholars, critics and visitors" and remained on display until August 2018. In 2021 the Edward Hopper House Museum & Study Center presented the exhibition Josephine Nivison Hopper: Edward’s Muse, which featured Josephine Hopper's watercolors.

== Influence on Edward Hopper ==
As Edward Hopper's wife and companion for more than 40 years, Jo influenced his work in numerous ways. Perhaps most importantly, it was her example that inspired Edward to seriously take up watercolor, during the summer of 1923.

A number of Jo's works depict motifs that would later become important for her husband. The watercolor Shacks, done in 1923, depicts two houses behind a dead tree, a subject similar to many of Hopper's later works. Jo's watercolor Movie Theater—Gloucester (c. 1926–27) foreshadowed Edward's interest in depicting movie theaters: he produced a drypoint of the subject in 1928, and then returned to it occasionally, most famously in the oil painting New York Movie (1939).

Beginning in the mid-1920s Jo became her husband's only model. It was she who thought up the names for a number of her husband's paintings, including one of his most famous oil paintings, Nighthawks. Despite their complicated relationship, she helped when her husband felt insecure about a painting in progress, as in, for example, the case of Five A.M. (1937). As late as 1936, Jo reported that her husband was highly competitive and that her starting a work would frequently inspire Edward to start his own. In The Lonely City Olivia Laing discusses Jo's career and how it floundered because Edward was "profoundly opposed to its existence. Edward didn't just fail to support Jo's painting, but rather worked actively to discourage it, mocking and denigrating the few things she did manage to produce".

It was at Jo's insistence that Edward not paint any other women except herself. In addition to her roles as Edward's muse and model, Jo served as the artists' record-keeper. In ledger books, now in the archives of the Whitney Museum of American Art, Jo maintained inventories of the Hoppers' works, Edward's and her own. She wrote the descriptions that accompanied Edward's pen-and-ink sketches of paintings that were turned over to the Rehn Galleries, and she recorded purchases by date, buyer, price, and commission. Jo's sketchbook—including the notes, rough drawings, and scribbled maps that she made from the passenger seat as Edward drove their Buick—documents the couple's summer driving trips in New England. Together with Jo's prolific output of diary entries and letters, these materials provide "A Window into the World of Edward and Josephine Hopper," to quote J. Anton Schiffenhaus.

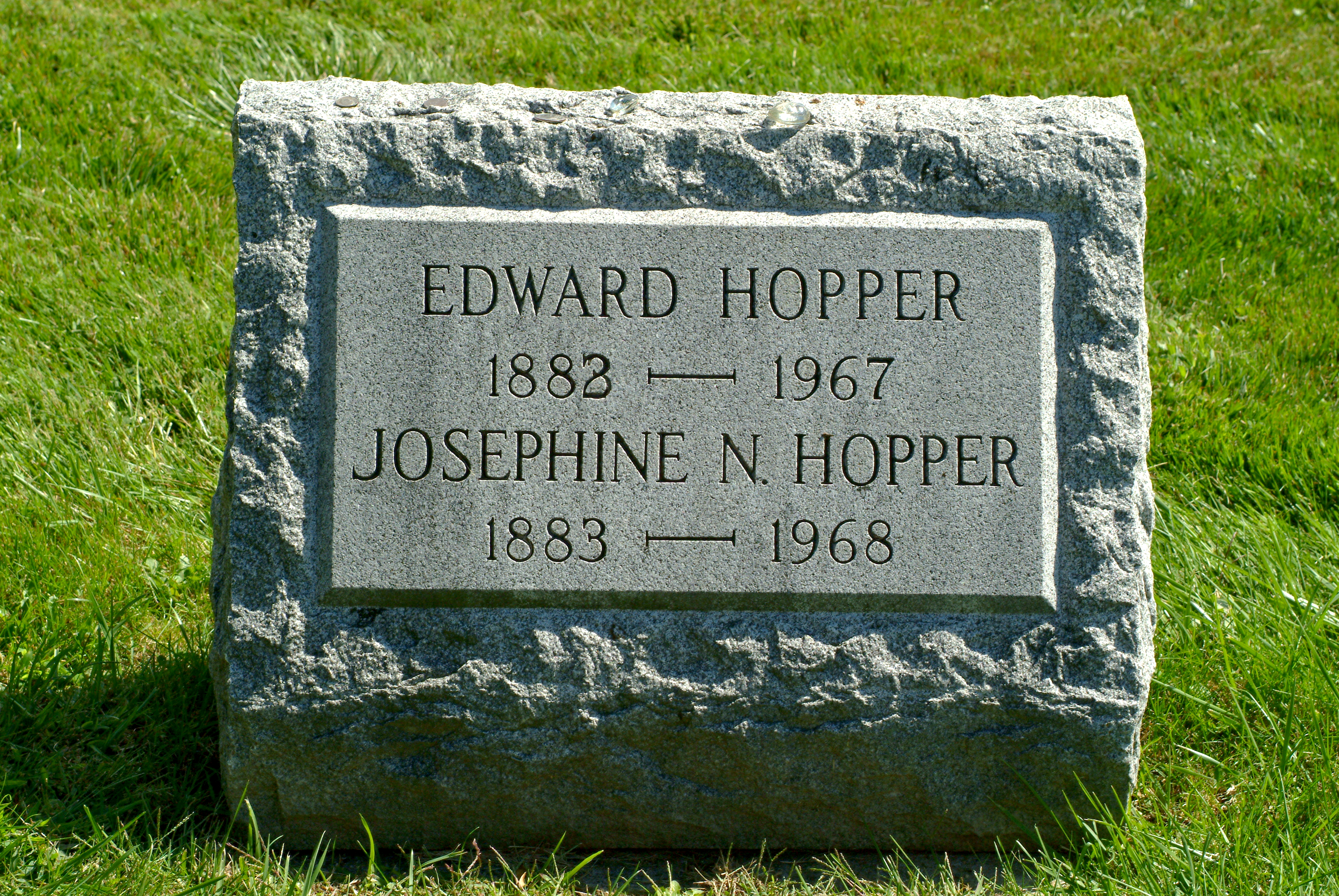
Gravestone Edward and Josephine H., Oak Hill Cemetery Nyack

== Selected works ==
- The Provincetown Bedroom, watercolor on paper, c. 1906
- View of Harbor in Volendam, oil on panel, 1907
- View of Harlem, oil on panel, 1907
- Shacks, watercolor on paper, 1923
- Our Lady of Good Voyage, watercolor on paper, 1923
- Pink House, watercolor, 1925
- Guinney Fleet in Fog, c. 1926–27
- Movie Theater–Gloucester, c. 1926–27
- Railroad gates, watercolor, 1928
- Gloucester roofs, watercolor, 1928
- Striped tents, watercolor, 1928
- House in Provincetown, watercolor, 1930
- Church steeple and rooftops, watercolor, 1930
- South Truro Church (Odor of Sanctity), c. 1930
- Chez Hopper I–IV, series of paintings of Hopper's South Truro house, 1935–1959
- Portrait of Alan Slater, watercolor on paper, 1937 (private collection).
- Untitled (Landscape), n.d. (Provincetown Art Association and Museum)
- Cape Cod Hills (exhibited as Sandy Hills), c. 1936–38
- Dauphineé House, c. 1931–36
- The Kerosene Oil Lamp (Gifts–Cape Cod Bureau Top), oil on canvas, 1944
- Park Outside Studio Window, 1945
- Church of San Esteban, oil on canvas, 1946
- Obituary (Fleurs du Temps Jadis), oil on canvas, 1948
- Portrait of Bertram Hartman, watercolor on paper, 1949
- Jewels for the Madonna (Homage to Illa), oil on canvas, 1951
- Edward Hopper Reading Robert Frost, oil on canvas, c. 1955
- Buick in California Canyon, oil on canvas, 1957
- Goldenrod & Milkweed in Glorietta Peach Can, oil on canvas, 1965
