= Devil's Gate (novel) =

2011 novel by Clive Cussler and Graham Brown

- First hardcover edition (US)
- Author: Clive Cussler & Graham Brown
- Language: English
- Series: The NUMA Files
- Genre: Adventure novel, thriller
- Publisher: Putnam (US); Michael Joseph (UK)
- Publication date: November 14, 2011
- Publication place: United States
- Media type: Print (hardback & paperback), ebook, audiobook
- Pages: 480 pp (hardcover)
- ISBN: 978-0-399-15782-0
- OCLC: 793582125
- Preceded by: The Navigator (2009)
- Followed by: The Storm (2012)

Devil's Gate is an adventure novel in author Clive Cussler's The NUMA Files. Co-written with Graham Brown, this installment is the ninth of that series which features the main character Kurt Austin. The story follows employees of NUMA (National Underwater and Marine Agency) who discover someone is developing a directed-energy weapon and thwart the dictator of Sierra Leone, Djemma Garand, and the mercenary group led by Andras the Knife before they are able to use the weapon. The hardcover edition was released November 14, 2011, it was subsequently released as a paperback, audiobook and ebook. It appeared on several best-seller lists and was describe by reviewers as being suitable for fans of Cussler and action-adventure stories.

== Background ==
This is the first collaboration between authors Clive Cussler and Graham Brown. This novel is the ninth in The NUMA (National Underwater and Marine Agency) Files series, following 2009's Medusa. Cussler writes several novel series and in 2011, with co-authors, he added to several series in addition to adding Devil's Gate to The NUMA Files, including The Jungle to the Oregon Files, The Race to the Isaac Bell Adventures, and The Kingdom to the Fargo Adventures.

== Plot ==
Kurt Austin and Joe Zavala aboard the NUMA ship Argo renders assistance to the cargo ship Kinjara Maru which has been attacked on the Atlantic ocean. Rescuing a sole survivor, they continue on to the Azores where they participate in a race of submersibles and discover a field of wrecked ships and planes which appear to have been drawn towards a magnetic, superconducting pillar. This discovery attracts scientists from around the world and NUMA is asked to regulate access to the underwater site.

With Paul and Gamay Trout investigating Kinjara Maru wreckage, Austin and the Russian scientist Katarina Luskaya being attacked, and NUMA director Dirk Pitt following up on leads in the United States, they begin to suspect that someone is building a directed-energy weapon and the magnetic pillar is a hoax. The scientists are kidnapped by a mercenary named Andras the Knife and delivered to Sierre Leone dictator Djemma Garand who forces them to work on the weapon.

Over the next couple weeks, Garand begins nationalizing industries and ceases international loan repayments. Austin and Zavala discover the location of Andras's ship and sneak Austin aboard. After Russian intelligence informs American officials of an impending attack by Garand on Washington, D.C., the US Navy begin an attack on Garand's super-weapon they had traced to an off-shore platform with Paul and Gamay Trout sabotaging its foundation via a submersible. Aboard the mercenary ship Austin rescues Luskaya, sabotages the ship's weapon system, and kills Andras.

== Style and genre ==
Devil's Gate is the ninth novel in The NUMA Files series. This series features protagonist Kurt Austin, as well as supporting characters who work for the National Underwater and Marine Agency, an American organization dedicated to exploring the ocean. The series exists in the same fictional universe as the Dirk Pitt Adventures series. The series are adventure novels which use thriller and action elements. Devil's Gate was compared to a James Bond story for the use of "high-stake thrills and hair-raising stakes" and "an attractive Russian scientist...who becomes both love interest and hostage".

== Publication and reception ==
The novel was published by the Penguin Group imprint Putnam as a hardcover released in the United States on November 14, 2011, and then as a paperback in November 2012. An ebook version and a 12.5 hour audiobook were also released in 2011. The audiobook is narrated by Scott Brick. The hardcover edition of novel peaked at #12 on the USA Today list of top-selling books on November 24, 2011 while the paperback version reached #49 on the same list a year later. On the Publishers Weekly best-selling lists, it peaked at #7 on the hardcover fiction list and #4 on the mass market paperback list. The novel also peaked at #5 on The New York Times Best Seller fiction list and #4 on Canada's The Globe and Mail best-sellers paperback fiction list.

The review published in the Library Journal recommended it for devotees of Cussler and for fans of underwater adventures. The Publishers Weekly review recommended it for "thriller fans who aren't too picky about credibility". Likewise, the reviewer for The Oklahoman wrote "If you crave continuous thrills, worldwide plots and the sometimes improbable but always possible...[this novel has] it for you." Writing for the Associated Press, another reviewer stated it "delivers the thrills and excitement that readers expect from a Clive Cussler novel. The NUMA Files series has been hit-and-miss, but this is one of the best...The villains are a bit shallow, but the heroes more than make up for the thinness of the bad guys." The Kirkus Reviews concluded the novel is "vintage Cussler...just right for the armchair techie who likes his action nonstop and his characters uncomplicated. Nuance-seekers look elsewhere."
