= Craig Dirgo =

American writer

Craig Dirgo is an American author of techno thrillers and adventure novels, as well as non-fiction. He started off co-authoring with Clive Cussler on his non-fiction work. He soon moved to his own novels starring his character, John Taft, an agent of a fictitious US spy agency, the National Intelligence Agency. He co-authored with Cussler the first two "Oregon Files" novels.

After running projects at Cussler's National Underwater and Marine Agency group since 1987, he became a trustee of the organization.

Craig decided to check out filmed media to gain insight into how scripts are properly designed.

He has worked as Stand In and Background on a variety of productions including:

The Nice Guys, The Accountant, News of the World, Cry Macho, Stranger Things, The Cleaning Lady, Better Call Saul, American Primeval, Messiah, Loves Lies Bleeding, Oppenheimer, Longboard, Outer Range, Deputy, Dreamland, Roswell, Those Who Wish Me Dead, The Silk Road, Briarpatch, Interrogation, and The Lost Bus where he earned SAG status.

Since 2024 he has been doing stand up open mics primarily in Taos and Santa Fe New Mexico.

== Early life ==
Dirgo was born to an Air Force Colonel, and spent much of his youth around American and British airfields. Having become interested in a collection of cars owned by Cussler, he eventually went to work for NUMA. From 1987 he was Special Projects director on several expeditions, and remains a trustee.

== Works ==
=== John Taft ===
1. The Einstein Papers (1999)
2. Tremor (2006)
3. The Tesla Documents (2013)
4. The Cristos Parchment (2014)

=== Oregon Files ===
(with Clive Cussler)

- Golden Buddha (2003)
- Sacred Stone (2004)

=== Eli Cutter ===
1. Eli Cutter: Winter (2016)
2. Eli Cutter: Spring (2016)

=== Non-fiction ===
(with Clive Cussler)

- The Sea Hunters: True Adventures With Famous Shipwrecks (1996)
- Clive Cussler and Dirk Pitt Revealed (1998)
- The Sea Hunters II: Diving the World's Seas for Famous Shipwrecks (2002)

=== UAE Fiction ===
- The Abu Dhabi Caper (2024)

== Other fiction ==
- Gunnison Grit (2012)
- New South Britain (2013)
