= Devil's Gate =

Devil's Gate may refer to:

== Places ==
=== United States ===
- Devil's Gate (Nevada), a natural rock formation
- Devil's Gate (Wyoming), a natural rock formation
- Massacre Rocks in Idaho, another rock formation alternatively known as Devil's Gate
- Devil's Gate Pass, a mountain pass in Mono County, California
- Devil's Gate Dam, a flood-control dam in L.A. County, California, named after a nearby rock formation
- Devil's Gate-Weber Hydroelectric Power Plant in Utah

=== Other countries ===
- Devil's Gate 220, a Mikisew Cree reserve in Alberta, Canada
- Devil's Gate Cave (Chertovy Vorota Cave), an archaeological cave in Russia
- Devil's Gate (Crimea), a natural rock formation
- Devils Gate Power Station and Devils Gate Dam in northern Tasmania, Australia

== Arts and literature ==
- Devil's Gate (2004 film), a British film directed by Stuart St. Paul
- Devil's Gate (2017 film), an American film directed by Clay Staub
- "Devil's Gate", an episode of The Flying House anime series
- "Devil's Gate", a track on Dark Room by Australian rock group The Angels
- Devil's Gate (novel), a 2011 novel by Clive Cussler and Graham Brown
