= Nighthawk (disambiguation) =

A nighthawk is a nocturnal bird.

Nighthawk(s) or Night Hawk(s) may also refer to:

- Nighthawks (painting), by Edward Hopper, 1942

== Books and comics ==
- Nighthawk (novel), a 2017 novel by Clive Cussler
- Night Hawk (comics), a British superhero fictional character
- Night Hawk, fictional character appearing in Harvey Comics
- Nighthawk (DC Comics), a fictional cowboy
- Nighthawk (Marvel Comics), several characters

== Film and TV ==
- The Night Hawk (1921 film), British silent drama film
- The Night Hawk (1924 film), American Western film
- The Night Hawk (1938 film), American crime film
- Nighthawks (1978 film), British gay-themed film by Ron Peck
- Nighthawks (1981 film), American crime thriller
- Nighthawks (2019 film), American drama thriller by Grant S. Johnson
- Nighthawks (TV series), Irish comedy

== Music ==
- Coon–Sanders Original Nighthawk Orchestra, a jazz band founded by Carleton Coon and Joe Sanders
- Gibson Nighthawk, an electric guitar model
- Night Hawk (album), a 1961 album by Coleman Hawkins
- Nighthawk Records, an American record label
- Nighthawks Orchestra (also Vince Giordano & The Nighthawks), a jazz band led by Vince Giordano
- Nighthawks, an American rap duo formed by Camu Tao and Cage
  - Nighthawks (Nighthawks album), a 2002 album by the duo
- Nighthawks (Erik Friedlander album), 2014
- Robert Nighthawk, a blues musician (1909–1967)
- The Nighthawks, an American blues and roots band
- "Nighthawks", a song by Two Hours Traffic from the album Little Jabs

== Sports ==
- Night Hawk (lacrosse), Canadian lacrosse player at the 1904 Summer Olympics
- New Haven Nighthawks, a former ice hockey team
- North Georgia Nighthawks, the athletic program of the University of North Georgia
- Omaha Nighthawks, a former American football team
- Rochester Knighthawks, a National Lacrosse League team
- Thomas University Nighthawks, the athletic teams of Thomas University in Thomasville, Georgia
- Vancouver Nighthawks (WBL), a former World Basketball team
- Night Hawk, a bobsled driven by Steven Holcomb
- Night Hawk (horse), a Thoroughbred horse
- Guelph Nighthawks, a basketball team in the Canadian Elite Basketball League
- Nighthawk (cricket), a variant of the Nightwatchman in cricket
  - Stuart Broad, England cricketer

== Aviation ==
=== Aircraft ===
- Supermarine Nighthawk, a 1917 prototype quadraplane fighter
- Nighthawk, a sailplane variant of the Bowlus SP-1 Paperwing glider, designed in 1928
- Lockheed F-117 Nighthawk, 1980s stealth military aircraft

=== Squadrons ===
- The Nighthawks, nickname of the HMX-1 U.S. Marine Corps helicopter Squadron
- 409 Tactical Fighter Squadron of the Canadian Air Force originally set up as the British RAF's No. 409 Nighthawk Squadron

== Other ==
- Honda Nighthawk, a motorcycle line
- Nighthawk Custom, a firearm company based in Berryville, Arkansas
- Nighthawk (roller coaster), at Carowinds amusement park
- Nighthawk, Washington, an unincorporated community in the U.S. state
- Night Hawk (restaurant), a defunct chain of restaurants in Texas
- Nighthawks (video game), a 2026 video game about vampires
- Nighthawk, the common name of Apocordulia macrops, a species of Australian dragonfly
- Nighthawk, A series of Networking Products Manufactured By Netgear

== See also ==
- Nighthawking, illegal metal-detecting
