= The Gangster (novel) =

2016 novel by Clive Cussler

- First edition (US)
- Author: Clive Cussler & Justin Scott
- Language: English (American English)
- Series: Isaac Bell adventures
- Genre: Thriller
- Publisher: G. P. Putnam's Sons (US); Michael Joseph (UK)
- Publication date: March 1, 2016
- Publication place: United States
- Media type: Print (hardcover)
- Pages: 400 pp (first edition, hardcover)
- ISBN: 978-0-399-17595-4 (first edition, hardcover)
- Preceded by: The Assassin (2015)
- Followed by: The Cutthroat (2017)

The Gangster is an Isaac Bell adventure novel by Clive Cussler, the ninth in that series. The hardcover edition was released March 1, 2016.

== Plot ==
This novel is set in 1906 in New York City and centers around Isaac Bell, an investigator with the Van Dorn Detective Agency. Van Dorn is hired to protect clients from the Black Hand crime group. Bell puts together a group of Van Dorn's best people to find who is at the bottom of the Black Hand. Few clues exist until Bell discovers a familiar face that provides a link to the Black Hand. The Black Hand sets its sights on killing one of the top leaders of the country and Bell and his team must work to prevent this from happening."

== Reviews ==
The Real Book Spy website had this to say about The Gangster, "I didn’t feel like The Gangster lived up to the standard that Cussler has spoiled readers with for several decades."

The historical novel society had a much more positive review of this book, saying, "Cussler fans and any reader looking for a fast-paced thriller with larger-than-life protagonists will enjoy this ninth adventure of detective Isaac Bell."
