= The Solomon Curse =

2015 novel by Clive Cussler and Russell Blake

- First edition (US)
- Author: Clive Cussler & Russell Blake
- Language: English (American English)
- Series: Fargo Adventures
- Genre: Thriller novel
- Publisher: G. P. Putnam's Sons (US); Michael Joseph (UK)
- Publication date: September 1, 2015
- Publication place: United States
- Media type: Print (hardcover)
- Pages: 400 pp (first hardcover edition)
- ISBN: 039917432X (first edition, hardcover)
- Preceded by: The Eye of Heaven (2014)

The Solomon Curse is the seventh book in Clive Cussler's Fargo Adventures series.

== Plot ==
Husband-and-wife team Sam and Remi Fargo are asked by a colleague to help with an underwater archaeological project on Guadalcanal in the Solomon Islands. An ancient underwater complex is found just off the coast. The process of uncovering the ruins brings more questions than answers. This is a location where no known advanced civilization supposedly existed. Besides that someone has been to the site before and there is evidence the valuable items that were there have been removed. A clue points to the Japanese who occupied the site in World War II.

Sam and Remi look to the scant evidence to find answers as to where the gold and gems from the ruined complex ended up. Their efforts seem to upset a group of rebels, who make attempts to stop the excavation and to kill anyone, including Sam and Remi, who has any information or starts poking around. Added to all this are legends about the area around the ruins being cursed, legends about giants and unexplained disappearances of islanders over the years.

Cussler does not make his typical appearance in this novel.

== Reception of book ==
This book made the New York Times bestseller list one week, holding the ninth position in the Hardcover Fiction category for the week of Sept. 20, 2015. It was also on the bestseller list for Combined Print & E-Book Fiction category. Kirkus Reviews said of this book, "Cussler and Company continue the winning formula, and this jungle episode, featuring exotic locales and an interesting back story, will satisfy the cravings of every fan." Publishers Weekly did not like this book and had several complaints about Cussler's work. This source said, "Perhaps Cussler needs a new hand at the helm to get the series back on course."
