= Russell Blake (author) =

American writer

- Occupation: Novelist
- Writing career
- Period: 2011–
- Genre: Adventure
- Website: russellblake.com

Russell Blake is an author of thrillers. As of January 2021 he had written 65 books, writing up to 10000 words a day.

In 2014 he was chosen by Clive Cussler to co-write two books, The Eye of Heaven and The Solomon Curse, both about husband and wife treasure hunters Sam and Remi Fargo. In the second title, "Cussler and Company continue the winning formula, and this jungle episode, featuring exotic locales and an interesting back story, will satisfy the cravings of every fan." by Kirkus; Jeff Ayers for AP wrote that in first book, "...the history elements carry the day, as the link between the Vikings and ancient Mexico proves to be irresistible".

== Biography ==
Blake is a retired real estate developer who lives in Mexico.
