= Serpent (novel) =

1999 novel by Clive Cussler and Paul Kemprecos

- Paperback cover
- Author: Clive Cussler, with Paul Kemprecos
- Language: English
- Series: NUMA Files
- Genre: Thriller novel
- Publisher: Pocket Books
- Publication date: 1999
- Publication place: United States
- Media type: Print
- Followed by: Blue Gold

Serpent is the first book in the NUMA Files series of books co-written by best-selling author Clive Cussler and veteran of mystery books Paul Kemprecos, and was published in 1999. The main character of this series is Kurt Austin and Joe Zavala.

== Summary ==
This is the first book with Cussler's new hero Kurt Austin.

The main plot is about a group of men who call themselves "The Brotherhood" and have ties to a 15th-century religious order. The group in modern times has attempted to hide and destroy all evidence of pre-Columbian contact between the New and Old Worlds.

The book begins with the collision of the ships SS Andrea Doria and MS Stockholm and moves to modern times with gun fights and chases from Boston and Washington DC to Africa and Mexico. The introduction of replacements for Dirk Pitt and his sidekick does not change Cussler's plot.

In 1956, off the coast of Nantucket Island, a crew member of the Stockholm causes the collision with the Andrea Doria then disappears. After the collision, a waiter aboard the Andrea Doria witnesses the murder of several men beside an armored vehicle in the hold of the ship.

Years later, Marine archaeologist Nina Kirov is exploring underwater ruins off an isolated stretch of the coast of Morocco. The structures she discovers seems to attest to an ancient Phoenician port. She also observes a large stone head which intrigues her. Via computer she contacts a friend, another archaeologist at the University of Pennsylvania, who confirms that nearly identical stone heads have been viewed in the Yucatán.

Soon afterwards Nina, unable to sleep, slips out of camp. Returning to camp, she witnesses an armed force execute all the team members still in the camp. The assassins sight Nina and give chase. She eventually literally swims for her life, but a hovercraft pursues her with the obvious intention of killing her. A hand on her ankle yanks her beneath the surface of the sea. Kurt Austin, a diver from an offshore NUMA ship shares his auxiliary oxygen tank and saves her from certain death.

Returning with Moroccan authorities, Nina discovers that all evidence of the camp and its residents has been obliterated. The stone head has been destroyed. There is yet more bad news: her friend at Penn has been killed.

A later attack by the armed force on the ship imperils the lives of all aboard, but Kurt, his friend Joe Zavala, and the captain of the ship manage to outwit and defeat the would-be assassins.

Back in the USA, a meeting which includes Kurt, Joe, and Nina investigates the surprising number of archaeological teams that have disappeared. The sole connection of all the incidents seems to be a non-profit volunteer organization called Time-Quest, a part of Halcon Industries.

Meanwhile, another NUMA operative Gamay Trout is investigating some unusual Mayan ruins. She meets scientist/archaeologist Dr. Chi in the Yucatán, but they are confronted by chicleros, lawless men who steal Mayan artifacts. Her husband goes searching for her when she disappears. Through amazing feats Gamay and Dr Chi barely escape and meet up with her husband.

All these events seem connected and point to a fiendish plot by Halcon. Secrets in the long-distant past hold the key.
