= White Death (novel) =

2003 novel by Clive Cussler and Paul Kemprecos

- Author: Clive Cussler, with Paul Kemprecos
- Cover artist: Lawrence Ratzkin
- Language: English
- Series: NUMA Files and Kurt Austin
- Genre: Thriller novel
- Publisher: G. P. Putnam's Sons
- Publication date: 2003
- Publication place: United States
- Media type: Print
- Pages: 355
- ISBN: 0-425-19545-7
- Preceded by: Fire Ice
- Followed by: Lost City

White Death is the fourth book in the NUMA Files series of books co-written by coauthors Clive Cussler and Paul Kemprecos, and published in 2003. The main character of this series is Kurt Austin. The story includes Nazis, Basque separatists, an outcast murderous tribe, the Kiolya, of Eskimos, Canadian natives in northern Quebec, environmental activists and the usual female sex interest.

== Synopsis ==
In this novel, the main character Kurt Austin has to destroy a fish farm that makes mutant fish before they disrupt the entire eco-system.

The story begins with a confrontation between a radical environmentalist group and a Danish frigate leads to a disaster. A Sentinel of the Seas (SOS) vessel collides with the frigate. The frigate was trying to keep the SOS boat from interfering with local seal harvesting operations. Austin and Joe Zavala rescue men trapped on the Danish ship. After the two save the crew with their experimental underwater rescue submersible they investigate further.

Multinational corporation Oceanus is attempting to wrest control of all the fish in the seas for themselves and is killing anyone who attempts to stop them. Austin investigates an Oceanus remote shoreline fish farm, where he finds a “frankenfish” and armed guards. As Kurt is making his way out of the secret caves, his boat is blown up by a hand grenade and he only barely survives/ He is saved by shipping tycoon Balthazar Aguirrez, who is looking for ancient Basque relics to save off a war between the Spanish government and Basque separatists.

Gamay and Paul Trout are investigating an Oceanus fish farm in north east Canada and they almost get killed when run off the road.

The conclusion happens at a lake in northern Canada where Oceanus has an operation. The company plans to use a recovered WW 2 German zeppelin to distribute the fish across the seas where they would take over. With the assistance of the Aguirrez sons of Balthazar and his helicopters they attack the island and release SOS leaders and locals held prisoner there. The zeppelin with the first load of fish takes off with Kurt and Joe hanging on the tie down lines. They seize control of the zeppelin and drop the fish to expire on the refueling station.
