= The Romanov Ransom =

2017 novel by Clive Cussler

- First edition (US)
- Author: Clive Cussler and Robin Burcell
- Language: English
- Series: The Fargo Adventures
- Genre: Thriller novel
- Publisher: G. P. Putnam's Sons (US); Michael Joseph (UK)
- Publication date: Sept. 12, 2017
- Publication place: United States
- Media type: Print (hardcover)
- Pages: 400 pp (first edition, hardcover)
- ISBN: 978-0399575549
- LC Class: PS3553.U75 R66 2017
- Preceded by: Pirate (2016)
- Followed by: The Gray Ghost (2018)

The Romanov Ransom is the ninth novel in The Fargo Adventures series by Clive Cussler.

== Plot ==
Sam and Remi Fargo embark on a new quest to uncover a lost treasure, this time artifacts that vanished with the fall of the Russian Romanov dynasty. Their search leads them across northern Africa, Europe, and South America. However, they are not alone in their pursuit. A shadowy organization known as the Werewolves is also seeking the treasure with the aim of establishing a Nazi Fourth Reich. Sam and Remi must be vigilant, unsure of who they can trust in this treacherous journey.

== Reviews ==
Kirkus Reviews liked this novel, saying, "Cussler’s plots sometime slip outside of the box of believability, but he’s always entertaining."The Daily Courier, of Prescott, Arizona, gave another favorable review of this book, saying, "Fans of this series expect nothing less, and “The Romanov Ransom” doesn’t disappoint."

This book was at number four for hardcover fiction on The New York Times bestseller list for October 1, 2017.
