= Justin Scott (writer) =

American writer

- Born: Manhattan, New York City, New York, U.S.
- Occupation: Novelist
- Writing career
- Pen name: Paul Garrison, J. S. Blazer
- Language: English
- Period: 1973–present
- Genre: Adventure
- Website: justinscott-paulgarrison.com

Justin Scott is an American novelist. Scott sometimes uses the pseudonyms Paul Garrison and J. S. Blazer.

== Early life ==
Scott was born in Manhattan, New York City, New York, U.S. Scott's father was Alexander Leslie Scott, a novelist. Scott's mother, Lily K. Scott, was also a novelist. Scott grew up on Long Island's Great South Bay. His sister, Alison Scott Skelton, is also a novelist.

== Career ==
Scott has written fourteen books under his own name, including the Ben Abbott Mystery series. He has written seven books under the pseudonym Paul Garrison and two under the pseudonym J. S. Blazer. He has coauthored ten books with Clive Cussler.

== Bibliography ==
=== Books authored solely by Justin Scott ===
Title	Publication Date
Many Happy Returns	1973
Treasure for Treasure	1974
The Shipkiller	1978
The Turning	1978
Normandie Triangle	1981
A Pride of Royals	1983
Rampage	1985
The Auction	1985
The Widow of Desire	1989
The Nine Dragons	1991
The Empty Eye of the Sea	1993
HardScape (Ben Abbott #1)	1994
Treasure Island: A Modern Novel	1994
StoneDust (Ben Abbott #2)	1996
Frostline (Ben Abbott #3)	1997
McMansion (Ben Abbott #4)	2007
Mausoleum (Ben Abbott #5)	2007

=== Under pen name Paul Garrison ===
Title	Publication Date
Fire and Ice	1998
Red Sky at Morning	2000
Buried at Sea	2002
Sea Hunter	2003
The Ripple Effect	2004
The Janson Command	2012
The Janson Option	2014

=== Under pen name J. S. Blazer ===
Title	Publication Date
Deal Me out	1973
Lend A Hand	1975

=== Books written with Clive Cussler ===
Title	Publication Date
The Wrecker	2009
The Spy	2010
The Race	2011
The Thief	2012
The Striker	2013
The Bootlegger	2014
The Assassin	2015
The Gangster	2016
The Cutthroat	2017
