= The Striker (Cussler novel) =

Novel by Clive Cussler

- First edition (US)
- Author: Clive Cussler & Justin Scott
- Language: English (American English)
- Series: Isaac Bell tales
- Genre: Thriller
- Publisher: G. P. Putnam's Sons (US); Michael Joseph (UK)
- Publication date: March 6, 2013
- Publication place: United States
- Media type: Print (hardcover)
- Pages: 495 pp (first edition, hardcover)
- ISBN: 978-1410455888 (first edition, hardcover)
- Preceded by: The Thief (2012)
- Followed by: The Bootlegger (2014)

The Striker is an Isaac Bell adventure novel, the sixth in that series. The hardcover edition was released March 6, 2013. Other editions were released on different dates.

== Plot ==
This novel is set in both 1902 and 1912 and in various locations in the United States. Isaac Bell leads a team of Van Dorn detectives in a search to find who is causing violent mayhem in various mining operations and metal refinement facilities. While union activists are being blamed, Bell doubts this. Most of the action takes place in 1902, but Bell is unable to get to the bottom of the trouble. After a while, he reaches a dead end. In 1912 several new leads develop, enabling Bell to pursue the person he believes is responsible.

== Reviews ==
The Striker was on the USA Today best seller list for nine weeks, starting in March 2013. It reached number 11 at its highest point on this list. Kirkus Reviews provided a positive editorial review of this book as soon as it was published. Publishers Weekly also liked the book, saying, "The action flows swiftly, and the authors do a good job depicting the work conditions and the class warfare of the time." The Historical Novel Society had another positive review of this novel. The review from this organization said, "Whether careening down a mineshaft or aboard a churning, bomb-laden steamboat on the Monongahela, this thriller keeps readers enthralled from start to finish."
