= The Cutthroat =

2017 novel by Clive Cussler

- First edition (US)
- Author: Clive Cussler & Justin Scott
- Language: English (American English)
- Series: Isaac Bell adventures
- Genre: Thriller
- Publisher: G. P. Putnam's Sons (US); Michael Joseph (UK)
- Publication date: March 14, 2017
- Publication place: United States
- Media type: Print (Hardcover)
- Pages: 416 pp (first edition, hardcover)
- ISBN: 978-0-399-57560-0 (first edition, hardcover)
- Preceded by: The Gangster (2016)

The Cutthroat is an Isaac Bell adventure tale, the tenth in that series. The hardcover edition was released March 14, 2017. Other editions were released on different dates.

== Plot ==
This novel is set in 1911 and centers around Isaac Bell, the chief investigator of the Van Dorn Detective Agency. Van Dorn is hired to find a young girl who ran away to become an actress. Hoping to find her and set her father's mind at ease, instead she turns up brutally murdered. Bell has a hunch this is not an isolated crime and his hunch is correct. Many young aspiring actresses as far back as 1891 have been turning up either missing or dead. Bell's hunt for the murderer takes him to London to look into a series of similar murders that took place until 1891 until suddenly stopping. Bell soon suspects he could be chasing one of the most monstrous murderers of all time."

== Reviews ==
Kirkus Reviews posted a positive review of this novel, saying, "Despite an awkward transition or two and a bit of padding (there’s a recipe for Welsh rarebit), the Bell series hits the right note for those who like crime fiction with a unique setting." Likewise, Publishers Weekly gave a positive review, observing that The Cutthroat had an "intriguing premise" that "Jack the Ripper is alive and well and rampaging across early-20th-century America" which fans of historical action novels would enjoy.

This book made it to the number one spot on The New York Times Best Sellers List for Hardcover Fiction and it was number three for the Combined Print & E-Book Fiction.
