= Fire Ice =

2002 novel by Clive Cussler and Paul Kemprecos

- First edition
- Author: Clive Cussler, with Paul Kemprecos
- Language: English
- Series: NUMA Files
- Genre: Thriller novel
- Publisher: G. P. Putnam's Sons
- Publication date: 2002
- Publication place: United States
- Media type: Print
- Preceded by: Blue Gold
- Followed by: White Death

Fire Ice is the third book in the NUMA Files series of books co-written by best-selling author Clive Cussler and Paul Kemprecos, and was published in 2002. The main character of this series is Kurt Austin.

== Plot ==
In this novel, a Russian businessman with Tsarist ambitions masterminds a plot against America, which involves triggering a set of earthquakes on the ocean floor, creating a number of tsunami to hit the USA coastline. It is up to Kurt and his team, and some new allies, to stop his plans. The businessman's first move is to hijack a US Navy research submarine, the NR-1. The crew are captured and beaten up by neo-Cossacks. Then they are rescued by Kurt and his team, minus the captain and pilot.
