= Chinese Sea Hunter =

Ship

History

PRC

General characteristics
- Type: Technological research ship
- Displacement: ≈ 100 t
- Length: ≈ 46 m
- Beam: ≈ 13 m
- Propulsion: Marine Diesel

Chinese Sea Hunter is a technical research ship in the People’s Republic of China (PRC), but it is not known if it an official Chinese government-funded program such as from the People's Liberation Army Navy (PLAN), or a private venture.

Developed by Tong-Fang-Jiang-Xin Shipyard (同方江新造船厂) in Jiujiang, the ship was launched before August 30, 2019, and outwardly, the Chinese Sea Hunter is extremely similar to Sea Hunter developed in the United States, adopting the same trimaran hull, but the Chinese version is slightly longer and narrower than its American counterpart. Chinese Sea Hunter is currently undergone various tests, and presumably, it would be used for research on anti-submarine warfare like its American counterpart. Specification:

- Length (m): ≈ 46
- Width (m): ≈ 13
- Displacement (t): ≈ 100

Type	NATO designation	Pennant No.	Name (English)	Name (Han 中文)	Commissioned	Displacement	Fleet	Status
Chinese Sea Hunter	?	6051	Unknown	Unknown	2020	≈100 t	In tests	Active
