= The Kingdom (Cussler and Blackwood novel) =

2011 book by Clive Cussler, Grant Blackwood

- First edition
- Author: Clive Cussler & Grant Blackwood
- Language: English (American English)
- Series: Fargo Adventures
- Genre: Thriller novel
- Publisher: G. P. Putnam's Sons (US); Michael Joseph (UK)
- Publication date: June 6, 2011
- Publication place: United States
- Media type: Print (Hardcover) and ebook
- Pages: 400 (first hardcover edition)
- ISBN: 978-0-399-15742-4 (first edition, hardcover)
- Preceded by: Lost Empire (2010)
- Followed by: The Tombs (2012)

The Kingdom is the third in a series of adventure novels by Clive Cussler, co-authored by Grant Blackwood, whose main characters are adventurers and treasure hunters Sam Fargo and his wife, Remi. The book's hardcover edition was first published June 6, 2011. Other editions of this novel were released on various dates in 2011 and 2012.

== Plot ==
This novel is mostly set in Nepal, but parts of it take place in Indonesia, India, Tibet, southern China, Albania, Bulgaria and at the Fargo home and research center on the California coast. The book starts with the Fargos finishing their work at Krakatoa, when they are requested by Texas oil baron Charley King to go to Nepal to find a friend of theirs who was hired by King to find his long-lost father. Once in Nepal the Fargos find little in their search that makes sense. While they get their friend's release, they find a trail of intrigue going back to the 1300s. As usual, they find themselves confronting dangerous adversaries.

As he does so many times, Clive Cussler writes himself into the novel as a bit character. The Fargos meet up with him in a library in Sofia, Bulgaria, and he provides them with a clue to aid them when they become completely confused when hunting for information on a 15th-century Eastern Orthodox priest.

== Reviews ==
The Kingdom has been reviewed by at least two professional reviewers, as well as by readers on the Amazon.com website, the Goodreads website and the Barnes & Noble website. A professional review by Publishers Weekly in April 2011 (as the book was being readied for release) said, "Fresh prose, a smart and amusing husband-and-wife team, interesting history and science, and a wildly imaginative plot all add up to a good time for Cussler's many fans as well as series newcomers." Pease Exchange in June 2011 had a professional review by Sarah Baker that was also positive, "If you enjoy a fast paced adventure, that combines history with the modern day, then read The Kingdom."

Reviews by the public are considered subjective and not always reliable. However, average reader ratings in the Amazon.com, the Barnes & Noble and the Goodreads websites all gave The Kingdom almost four of five stars.
