= The Sea Hunters: True Adventures with Famous Shipwrecks =

1996 book by Clive Cussler and Craig Dirgo

The Sea Hunters: True Adventures With Famous Shipwrecks
- First Edition Hardcover
- Author: Clive Cussler & Craig Dirgo
- Cover artist: Paul Bacon
- Language: English
- Subject: Shipwrecks; Underwater Archeology
- Publisher: Simon & Schuster
- Publication date: 1996 (1st edition)
- Publication place: United States
- Media type: hardcover
- Pages: 364
- ISBN: 0-684-83027-2
- OCLC: 34958890
- Dewey Decimal: v930.1/028/04 21
- LC Class: G525 .C965 1996
- Followed by: The Sea Hunters II: Diving the World's Seas for Famous Shipwrecks

The Sea Hunters: True Adventures with Famous Shipwrecks is a nonfiction work by adventure novelist Clive Cussler published in the United States in 1996. This work details the author's search for famous shipwrecks with his nonprofit organization NUMA. There is also a television series titled The Sea Hunters which is based on the book. It airs on the National Geographic Channel and History Television in Canada.

== Plot ==
In 1978 adventure novelist Clive Cussler funded and participated in an attempt to find John Paul Jones's famous Revolutionary warship, the USS Bonhomme Richard. The expedition was not successful; however, it eventually led to the formation of a nonprofit organization named after the fictional agency in his novels, the National Underwater and Marine Agency, and dedicated to the discovery of famous shipwrecks around the world. In The Sea Hunters, Cussler documents the search for nine famous shipwrecks while also offering dramatized imaginings on the events that led up to the loss of the ship. To date, the group's most successful find is the (disputed) discovery of the final resting place of the Confederate submarine Hunley, detailed in Part 6. The Hunley was later raised and is now on public display.

== Contents ==
- Part 1: The Steamboat Lexington
- Part 2: The Republic of Texas Navy ship Zavala
- Part 3: USS Cumberland and CSS Florida
- Part 4: CSS Arkansas
- Part 5: USS Carondelet
- Part 6: The Confederate Submarine H. L. Hunley
- Part 7: The Lost Locomotive of Kiowa Creek
- Part 8: HMS Pathfinder, U-21, and U-20.
- Part 9: The Troop Transport SS Leopoldville
- Part 10: A listing of the sixty-four shipwreck sites documented by the National Underwater and Marine Agency

Release details

- 1996, USA, Simon & Schuster 0-684-83027-2, October 7, 1996, Hardcover.
- 1997, USA, Pocket 0-671-00180-9, August 1, 1997, Paperback.
