= Nighthawk (novel) =

2017 novel by Clive Cussler and Graham Brown

- First edition (US)
- Author: Clive Cussler and Graham Brown (writer)
- Language: English
- Series: The NUMA Files
- Genre: Thriller novel
- Publisher: G. P. Putnam's Sons (US); Michael Joseph (UK)
- Publication date: May 30, 2017
- Publication place: United States
- Media type: Print (hardcover)
- Pages: 464 pp (first edition, hardcover)
- ISBN: 978-0399184017
- LC Class: PS3553.U75 N54 2017
- Preceded by: The Pharaoh's Secret (2015)
- Followed by: The Rising Sea (2018)

Nighthawk is the fourteenth novel in the NUMA Files series by Clive Cussler.

== Plot ==
This novel centers around NUMA (National Underwater Marine Agency) crew leaders Kurt Austin and Joe Zavala. Nighthawk is an advanced unmanned aircraft that has been in space three years collecting data. On its return to Earth it defies its controllers who are guiding it to a safe landing and it presumably crashes into the ocean. NUMA is requested by the National Security Agency (NSA) to help find and recover Nighthawk. The NSA sends one of its agents to assist and she, Austin and Zavala attempt to find Nighthawk.

The Russians and the Chinese also seek to find and recover the craft, as well. This adventure takes Austin, Zavala and others from NUMA off the coast of Ecuador and in the mountains of Peru. As Austin and Zavala search for Nighthawk, more of the story of the importance of what is inside this craft comes to light and why the stakes are so high that it be found quickly. They are to find the future of the world depends on their success. Austin meets a man named Urco, who is trying to study the Chachapoya people. He later, once NUMA uncovers the Nighthawk, was a spy nicknamed "The Falconer" who wanted to "turn the world back to the stone age". He is foiled, but it explodes partially over the Pacific Ocean which causes plenty of things to break. After this, both a couple of Russians who were helping to steal the Nighthawk and the NUMA crew are found on a Caribbean island, now friends.

== Reviews ==
Kirkus seemed to like this book, although its review alluded to some of the unlikely scenarios in its pages, saying, "Cussler and company deliver another fun page-turner with a plot ranging from the highly improbable to the totally implausible." The Real Book Spy website liked this book, saying, "A huge jump up from last year’s The Pharoah’s Secret, Nighthawk is an exciting thriller that seems slightly more realistic and timely after multiple news headlines about disappearing aircraft."
