= Henry Mattson =

Swedish painter (1887–1971)

Henry Elis Mattson
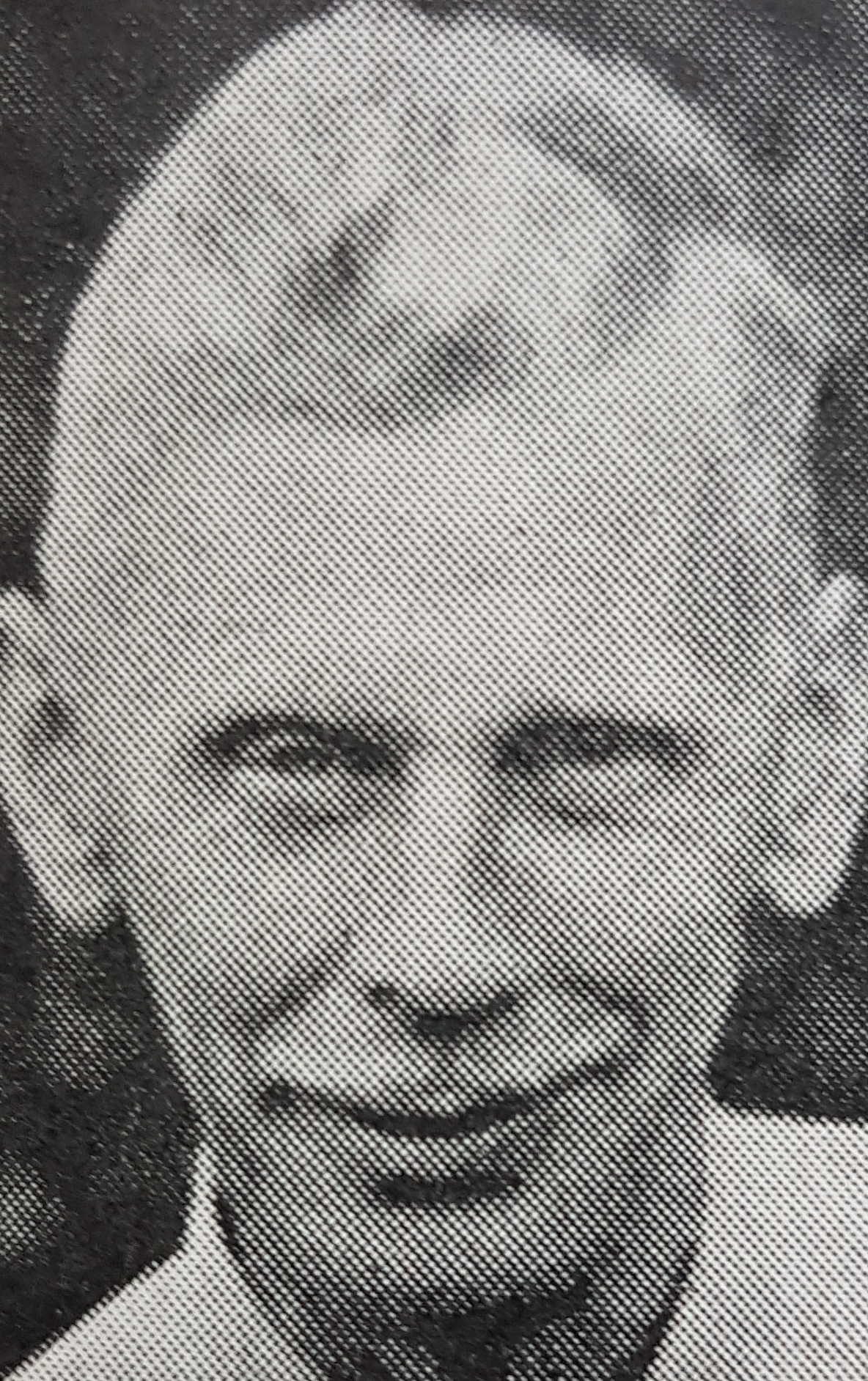
- Born: 7 August 1887; Gothenburg, Sweden
- Died: 7 September 1971 (aged 84); Woodstock, New York, U.S.
- Known for: seascapes, nocturnal scenes and figures
- Style: American Impressionism
- Awards: Guggenheim Fellowship for Creative Painting (1935); First William A. Clark Prize and Gold Medal (Corcoran Biennial of 1943); Jennie Sesnan Gold Medal, Pennsylvania Academy Of the Fine Arts (1945)

Henry Elis Mattson (August 7, 1887, Gothenburg - 7 August 1971, Woodstock) was a Swedish painter active mostly in the United States.

== Biography ==
Henry Mattson was the son of laborer John Emil Mattson and Augusta Pettersson. He emigrated to America in 1906 and first worked as a helper at a mechanical workshop in Worcester, Massachusetts. In his spare time, he engaged in self-study in painting, which was later supplemented by evening classes at the School of the Worcester Art Museum. After a few years of working at the mechanical workshop, he left his job to devote himself entirely to artistic pursuits. To deepen his knowledge of art, he returned to Gothenburg in 1912, where he was accepted as a student at the Valand Painting School. After just a few lessons, he was urged by his teacher (a well-known Gothenburg artist) to stay on as a student. Mattson immediately packed up his school supplies and returned to America.

He settled in Chicago, where he worked in a factory during the day and continued his self-study and painting in the evenings. After four years in Chicago, he moved to the Byrdcliffe Colony in Woodstock, New York in 1916, where he took lessons from the Swedish-American landscape painter John F. Carlson for three months. In the fall of 1921, he debuted with a small solo exhibition in New York, which, to his disappointment, did not bring him any attention.

Mattson continued to work tenaciously and eventually achieved a critical breakthrough, with Sheldon Cheney claiming Mattson should be considered one of America's great giant figures. In addition to a large number of exhibitions in America, he participated in group exhibitions in London, Paris and Italy. He was represented in the Swedish-American traveling exhibition that was shown in Sweden in 1920 and in the Swedish-American exhibition in Gothenburg in 1923. His public works include some frescoes at the post office in Portland, Maine. He married a woman named Daphne Sawyer in 1924.

During his career, he was awarded numerous scholarships and awards, including the Guggenheim Fellowship for the Creative Arts in 1935 and a gold medal from the Pennsylvania Academy of the Fine Arts in 1945. He became a member of the National Academy of Design in 1952.

Mattson's art consisted primarily of landscapes and machines, although he also painted portraits and still lifes. In his early art he was something of a poetic-mystical nature romantic who later developed towards a more heightened dramatic form of expression that is close to the stylistic language of Albert Pinkham Ryder. Mattson is represented at several American museums, including at Metropolitan Museum of Art, Smithsonian American Art Museum, Whitney Museum, Brooklyn Museum and The Encyclopaedia Britannica Collection.
