= Paul Kemprecos =

American novelist

- Kemprecos in 2007
- Born: March 11, 1939 (age 87)
- Occupation: Writer
- Website: www.paulkemprecos.com

Paul Kemprecos (born March 11, 1939) is an American writer of mysteries and adventure stories. He is a Shamus Award-winning author of six underwater detective thrillers, and had been co-writing with Clive Cussler the "NUMA Files" novels, which focus on Kurt Austin, head of NUMA's Special Assignments Team and his adventures.

== Works ==
=== Aristotle Socarides ===
1. Cool Blue Tomb (1991)
2. Neptune's Eye (1991)
3. Death in Deep Water (1992)
4. Feeding Frenzy (1993)
5. Mayflower Murder (1996)
6. Bluefin Blues (1997)
7. Gray Lady (2013)
8. Shark Bait (2018)

=== NUMA Files ===
(co-written with Clive Cussler)

- Serpent (1999)
- Blue Gold (2000)
- Fire Ice (2002)
- White Death (2003)
- Lost City (2004)
- Polar Shift (2005)
- The Navigator (2007)
- Medusa (2009)

=== Matinicus “Matt” Hawkins ===
1. The Emerald Scepter (2013)
2. The Minoan Cipher (2016)
