= Virginia Cuthbert =

American artist (1908–2001)

Virginia Cuthbert Elliot
- Born: August 27, 1908; West Newton, Pennsylvania
- Died: January 24, 2001 (aged 92)
- Education: Syracuse University (BFA); Chelsea College of Art and Design; Academie de la Grande Chaumiere; Academie Colarossi; University of Pittsburgh (MFA, 1934)
- Spouse: Phillip C. Elliot

Virginia Cuthbert Elliot (August 27, 1908, in West Newton, Pennsylvania – January 24, 2001) was an American artist.

== Life ==
She graduated from Syracuse University with a BFA. She studied at Chelsea College of Art and Design, the Academie de la Grande Chaumiere, and at the Academie Colarossi. She graduated from the University of Pittsburgh with an MFA in 1934. She married artist Philip C. Elliott, and both were professors at the University at Buffalo. Their papers are held at the Archives of American Art.
