= Clive Cussler =

American novelist and underwater explorer (1931–2020)

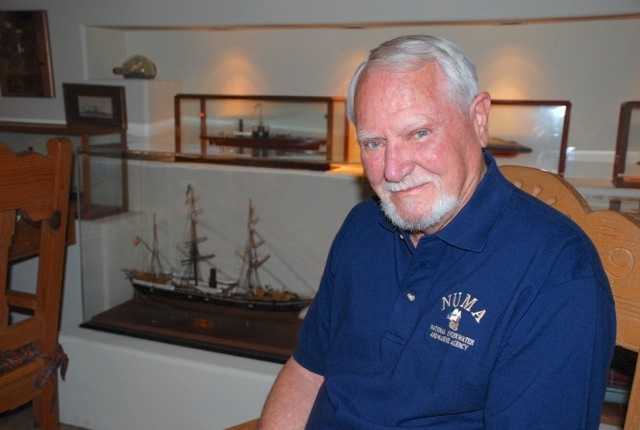
- Clive Cussler 2012
- Born: Clive Eric Cussler; July 15, 1931; Aurora, Illinois, U.S.
- Died: February 24, 2020 (aged 88); Paradise Valley, Arizona, U.S.
- Education: Pasadena City College
- Occupation: Novelist
- Spouse: Barbara Knight (m. 1955; died 2003)
- Children: Teri Cussler; Dirk Cussler; Dayna Cussler
- Writing career
- Period: 1973–2020
- Genre: Adventure
- Notable works: Dirk Pitt series; Oregon Files series; NUMA Files series; Fargo Adventure series; Issac Bell Adventure series
- Military Service
- Allegiance: United States
- Branch: United States Air Force
- Service years: 1950–1953
- Rank: Sergeant
- Website: cusslerbooks.com

Clive Eric Cussler (July 15, 1931 – February 24, 2020) was an American adventure novelist and underwater explorer. His thriller novels, many featuring the character Dirk Pitt, have been listed on The New York Times fiction best-seller list more than 20 times. Cussler was the founder and chairman of the National Underwater and Marine Agency (NUMA), which has discovered more than 60 shipwreck sites and numerous other notable underwater wrecks. He was the sole author or main author of more than 80 books. He often placed himself into his books as himself.

== Early life ==
Clive Cussler was born in Aurora, Illinois, the son of Eric Edward Cussler and Amy Adeline (née Hunnewell), and grew up in Alhambra, California. His father was from Germany and his mother's ancestors were from England.

In his memoir The Sea Hunters: True Adventures with Famous Shipwrecks, Cussler revealed that his father served in the Imperial German Army on the Western Front during World War I. Furthermore, one of Cussler's uncles served in the Imperial German Air Service and became a flying ace, shooting down 14 Allied aeroplanes.

He was awarded the rank of Eagle Scout when he was 14 years old. He attended Pasadena City College for two years and then enlisted in the United States Air Force during the Korean War. During his service with the Air Force, he was promoted to sergeant and worked as an aircraft mechanic and flight engineer for the Military Air Transport Service (MATS).

== Career ==
After his discharge from the military, Cussler went to work for the advertising industry, first as a copywriter and later as a creative director for two of the nation's most successful advertising agencies. As part of his duties, Cussler produced radio and television commercials, many of which won international awards including an award at the Cannes Lions International Advertising Festival.

After the publication in 1996 of Cussler's first nonfiction work, The Sea Hunters, he was awarded a Doctor of Letters degree in 1997 by the Board of Governors of the State University of New York Maritime College who accepted the work in lieu of a Ph.D. thesis. This was the first time in the college's 123-year history that such a degree had been awarded.

In 2002, Cussler was awarded the Naval Heritage Award from the U.S. Navy Memorial Foundation for his efforts concerning marine exploration.

Cussler was a fellow of the Explorers Club of New York, the Royal Geographical Society in London, and the American Society of Oceanographers.

=== Literary career ===
Clive Cussler began writing in 1965 when his wife took a job working nights for the local police department where they lived in California. After making dinner for the children and putting them to bed, he had no one to talk to and nothing much to do, so he decided to start writing. His most famous character is marine engineer, government agent and adventurer Dirk Pitt. The Dirk Pitt novels frequently have an alternative history premise—such as What if Atlantis were real?" or "What if Abraham Lincoln wasn't assassinated but was kidnapped?"

The first two Pitt novels, The Mediterranean Caper and Iceberg, were relatively conventional maritime thrillers. The third, Raise the Titanic!, established the pattern that subsequent Pitt novels would follow: a blend of adventure and advanced technology, generally involving megalomaniacal villains, lost ships, beautiful women, and sunken treasure.

Cussler's novels almost always begin with a chapter set in the past. These contain none of the novel's main characters and often seem disconnected from the plot until the main characters discover a mystery or secret relating the events of the first chapter to the rest of the story. This is almost always in the form of a long-lost artifact that is important to the villain's or hero's objectives. Often in the first chapter, a ship or airplane carrying a top-secret, important, or dangerous cargo is lost and never found, until it is recovered by a modern character later in the book.

Cussler's novels, like those of Michael Crichton, are examples of techno-thrillers. Cussler prefers fantastic spectacles and outlandish plot devices.

Cussler had seventeen consecutive titles listed on The New York Times fiction best seller list. In 2014, McFarland Publishing released The Clive Cussler Adventures: A Critical Review by Steven Philip Jones, the first critical review textbook of Cussler's novels.

=== NUMA ===
As an underwater explorer, Cussler discovered more than 60 shipwreck sites and wrote non-fiction books about his findings. He was also the initiator of the National Underwater and Marine Agency (NUMA), a non-profit organization with the same name as the fictional government agency that employs Dirk Pitt.

Important finds by NUMA include:

- RMS Carpathia, the ship famed for being the first to come to the aid of RMS Titanic survivors.
- CSS Manassas, the first ironclad of the civil war, formerly the icebreaker Enoch Train.

A visual and interactive depiction of Cussler's NUMA Foundation Expeditions has been made available as an extension of NUMA's original website that has since been deleted.

Finds formerly believed to be important include:

- Mary Celeste, the famed ghost ship that was found abandoned with cargo intact (the identification of this wreck as the Mary Celeste has since been placed into a state of question after one researcher disputed the claim's authenticity).

== Adaptations ==
- Raise the Titanic! (1980) featuring Richard Jordan as Dirk Pitt, Jason Robards as Admiral James Sandecker, David Selby as Gene Seagram, and Anne Archer as Dana Seagram.
- Sahara (2005), featuring Matthew McConaughey as Dirk Pitt, Steve Zahn as Al Giordino, William H. Macy as Admiral Sandecker, and Penélope Cruz as Eva Rojas. It grossed $122 million with $241 million in production and distribution expenses.

== Personal life ==
Clive Cussler married Barbara Knight in 1955, and they remained married for nearly 50 years until her death in 2003. Together they had three children—Teri, Dirk, and Dayna—four grandchildren, and four great-grandchildren.

He was an avid car collector of classic automobiles that are on display at the Cussler Museum in Arvada, Colorado. Clive Cussler was a part-time resident of both Arizona and Colorado.

Cussler died at his home in Paradise Valley, Arizona, on February 24, 2020, at age 88 of undisclosed causes.

== Bibliography ==
=== Dirk Pitt Adventures ===
#	Title	Publication date
1	The Mediterranean Caper	1973
2	Iceberg	1975
3	Raise the Titanic!	1976
4	Vixen 03	1978
5	Night Probe	1981
6	Pacific Vortex!	1983
7	Deep Six	1984
8	Cyclops	1986
9	Treasure	1988
10	Dragon	1990
11	Sahara	1992
12	Inca Gold	1994
13	Shock Wave	1996
14	Flood Tide	1997
15	Atlantis Found	1999
16	Valhalla Rising	2001
17	Trojan Odyssey	2003
18	Black Wind ^{Đ}	2004
19	Treasure of Khan ^{Đ}	2006
20	Arctic Drift ^{Đ}	2008
21	Crescent Dawn ^{Đ}	2010
22	Poseidon's Arrow ^{Đ}	2012
23	Havana Storm ^{Đ}	2014
24	Odessa Sea ^{Đ}	2016
25	Celtic Empire ^{Đ}	2019
26	Clive Cussler's The Devil's Sea ^{ĐĐ}	2021
27	Clive Cussler's The Corsican Shadow ^{ĐĐ}	2023
28	Clive Cussler Obsidian Sky ^{ĐĐ}	November 10, 2026

=== The NUMA Files ===
This series of books is based on the character Kurt Austin, Team Leader of NUMA's Special Assignments division and his adventures. Some characters from the Pitt novels appear such as Sandecker, Al Giordino, Rudi Gunn, Hiram Yaeger and St. Julien Perlmutter. Pitt makes brief appearances in the books Serpent, White Death, Polar Shift, Devil's Gate, The Storm, Zero Hour, and Ghost Ship and is mentioned in Lost City. Juan Cabrillo, the captain of the ship Oregon, also made a brief appearance in The Pharaoh's Secret.

#	Title	Publication date
1	Serpent ^{*}	Jun 1, 1999
2	Blue Gold ^{*}	Aug 1, 2000
3	Fire Ice ^{*}	Jun 3, 2002
4	White Death ^{*}	Jun 23, 2003
5	Lost City ^{*}	Jul 22, 2004
6	Polar Shift ^{*}	Aug 30, 2005
7	The Navigator ^{*}	Jun 5, 2007
8	Medusa ^{*}	Jul 2, 2009
9	Devil's Gate ^{†}	Nov 14, 2011
10	The Storm ^{†}	May 29, 2012
11	Zero Hour ^{†}	May 28, 2013
12	Ghost Ship ^{†}	May 27, 2014
13	The Pharaoh's Secret ^{†}	Nov 17, 2015
14	Nighthawk ^{†}	Jun 19, 2017
15	The Rising Sea ^{†}	Mar 13, 2018
16	Sea of Greed ^{†}	Nov 6, 2018
17	Journey of the Pharaohs ^{†}	Mar 10, 2020
18	Fast Ice ^{†}	Mar 9, 2021
19	Clive Cussler's Dark Vector ^{††}	May 24, 2022
20	Clive Cussler's Condor's Fury ^{††}	Sept 5, 2023
21	Clive Cussler's Desolation Code ^{††}	Nov 17, 2024
22	Clive Cussler's Cold Fire ^{††}	Jun 2, 2026

=== The Oregon Files ===
This series of books features a ship named the Oregon, which Cussler introduced in the Dirk Pitt Adventures novel Flood Tide (1997). While appearing to be a decrepit freighter, it is actually a high-tech advanced ship used by an unnamed and mysterious "Corporation" under the leadership of Juan Cabrillo. The ship is run like a business, with its crew being shareholders, taking jobs for the CIA and other agencies to help stop crime and terrorism. The crew is adept at disguises, combat, computer hacking and more to aid them in their missions. Kurt Austin, Joe Zavala, and Dirk Pitt all make cameo appearances in the fourth volume, Skeleton Coast (Cabrillo speaks to Pitt on the telephone; and Austin and Zavala appear at the end).

#	Title	Publication date
1	Golden Buddha	2003
2	Sacred Stone	2004
3	Dark Watch	2005
4	Skeleton Coast	2006
5	Plague Ship	2008
6	Corsair	2009
7	The Silent Sea	2010
8	The Jungle	2011
9	Mirage	2013
10	Piranha	2015
11	The Emperor's Revenge	2016
12	Typhoon Fury	2017
13	Shadow Tyrants	2018
14	Final Option	2019
15	Marauder	2020
16	Clive Cussler's Hellburner ^{╛}	2022
17	Clive Cussler's Fire Strike ^{╛}	2023
18	Clive Cussler's Ghost Soldier ^{╛}	2024
19	Clive Cussler's Quantum Tempest ^{╛}	2025

=== Isaac Bell Adventures ===
These books are set mostly in the U.S. in the early part of the 20th century. They center around Isaac Bell, a brilliant investigator for the Van Dorn Detective Agency, which appears to be modeled after the real-life Pinkerton Agency. Like Pitt, Bell has an affinity for automobiles and is a crack shot. The first book reveals that Bell survives into 1950 with a wife and grown children. Though the setting is a century ago, the books still qualify as techno-thrillers, since they feature the advanced technology of that time such as private express trains, telegraphs, telephones, dreadnought battleships and early airplanes. Isaac Bell also is a principal character of the background story in the Fargo Adventures novel The Gray Ghost.

#	Title	Publication date
1	The Chase	2007
2	The Wrecker ^{‖}	2009
3	The Spy ^{‖}	2010
4	The Race ^{‖}	2011
5	The Thief ^{‖}	2012
6	The Striker ^{‖}	2013
7	The Bootlegger ^{‖}	2014
8	The Assassin^{‖}	2015
9	The Gangster ^{‖}	2016
10	The Cutthroat ^{‖}	2017
11	The Titanic Secret ^{§}	2019
12	The Saboteurs ^{§}	2021
13	Clive Cussler's The Sea Wolves ^{§§}	2022
14	Clive Cussler's The Heist ^{§§}	2024
15	Clive Cussler's The Iron Storm ^{§§}	2025

=== Fargo Adventures ===
The series focuses on Sam and Remi Fargo, a married couple who are professional treasure hunters.

#	Title	Publication date
1	Spartan Gold ^	2009
2	Lost Empire ^	2010
3	The Kingdom ^	2011
4	The Tombs ^{+}	2012
5	The Mayan Secrets ^{+}	2013
6	The Eye of Heaven ^{×}	2014
7	The Solomon Curse ^{×}	2015
8	Pirate ^{**}	2016
9	The Romanov Ransom ^{**}	2017
10	The Gray Ghost ^{**}	2018
11	The Oracle ^{**}	2019
12	Wrath of Poseidon ^{**}	2020
13	The Serpent's Eye ^{₱}	Apr 2027

=== Non-fiction ===
Title	Publication date
The Sea Hunters: True Adventures With Famous Shipwrecks ^{‡}	1996
Clive Cussler and Dirk Pitt Revealed ^{‡}	1998
The Sea Hunters II: Diving the World's Seas for Famous Shipwrecks ^{‡}	2002
Built for Adventure: The Classic Automobiles of Clive Cussler and Dirk Pitt	2011
Built to Thrill: More Classic Automobiles from Clive Cussler and Dirk Pitt	2016

=== Children's books ===
Title	Publication date
The Adventures of Vin Fiz	2006
The Adventures of Hotsy Totsy	2010

(*) indicates books co-authored with Paul Kemprecos.

(^{Đ}) indicates books co-authored with Dirk Cussler.

(^{ĐĐ}) indicates books authored by Dirk Cussler.
(†) indicates books co-authored with Graham Brown.
(††) indicates books authored by Graham Brown.
(‡) indicates books co-authored with Craig Dirgo.
(§) indicates books co-authored with Jack Du Brul.
(§§) indicates books authored by Jack Du Brul.
(‖) indicates books co-authored with Justin Scott.
(^) indicates books co-authored with Grant Blackwood.
(+) indicates books co-authored with Thomas Perry.
(×) indicates books co-authored with Russell Blake.
(≠) indicates books co-authored with Boyd Morrison.
(**) indicates books co-authored with Robin Burcell.
(***) indicates books authored by Robin Burcell.
(╛) indicates books authored by Mike Maden.

(^{₱}) indicates books authored by Ryan Pote.

== Awards ==
Year	Award	Category	Work	Result	Ref.
1974	Edgar Allan Poe Award	Best Paperback Original	The Mediterranean Caper	Nominated	
1992	Japan Adventure Fiction Association Prize	-	Sahara	Won	
2006	International Thriller Writers Awards	"Thrillermaster" Award	-	Won	
