= John Wesley Carroll =

American painter (1892–1959)

John Wesley Carroll (Wichita, Kansas 1892 - Albany, New York Nov. 7, 1959) was an American painter known for his modernist portraits.

== Biography ==
John Carroll was born in Wichita, Kansas and grew up in San Francisco, California. He studied art at the University of California, Berkeley and was awarded a Guggenheim Fellowship in 1927, which allowed him to travel and work in Europe. He taught at the Art Students League in New York City before being chosen in 1930 to lead the painting department at the Society of Arts and Crafts in Detroit, where he taught for more than a decade. A portrait he did of Gloria Vanderbilt and one of her children won the 1954 Benjamin Altman Prize from the National Academy of Design. Among several others, his work has been exhibited at the New York Museum of Modern Art, the Whitney Museum, and the Detroit Institute of Arts. He divided his time between his studio in New York City and his farm in East Chatham, New York where he raised cattle for the war effort. Carroll died in Albany, NY in 1959.

== Style ==
Carroll was known for his romantic portraits of women His major influences included Paul Cézanne, George Bellows, and Andrew Dasburg.

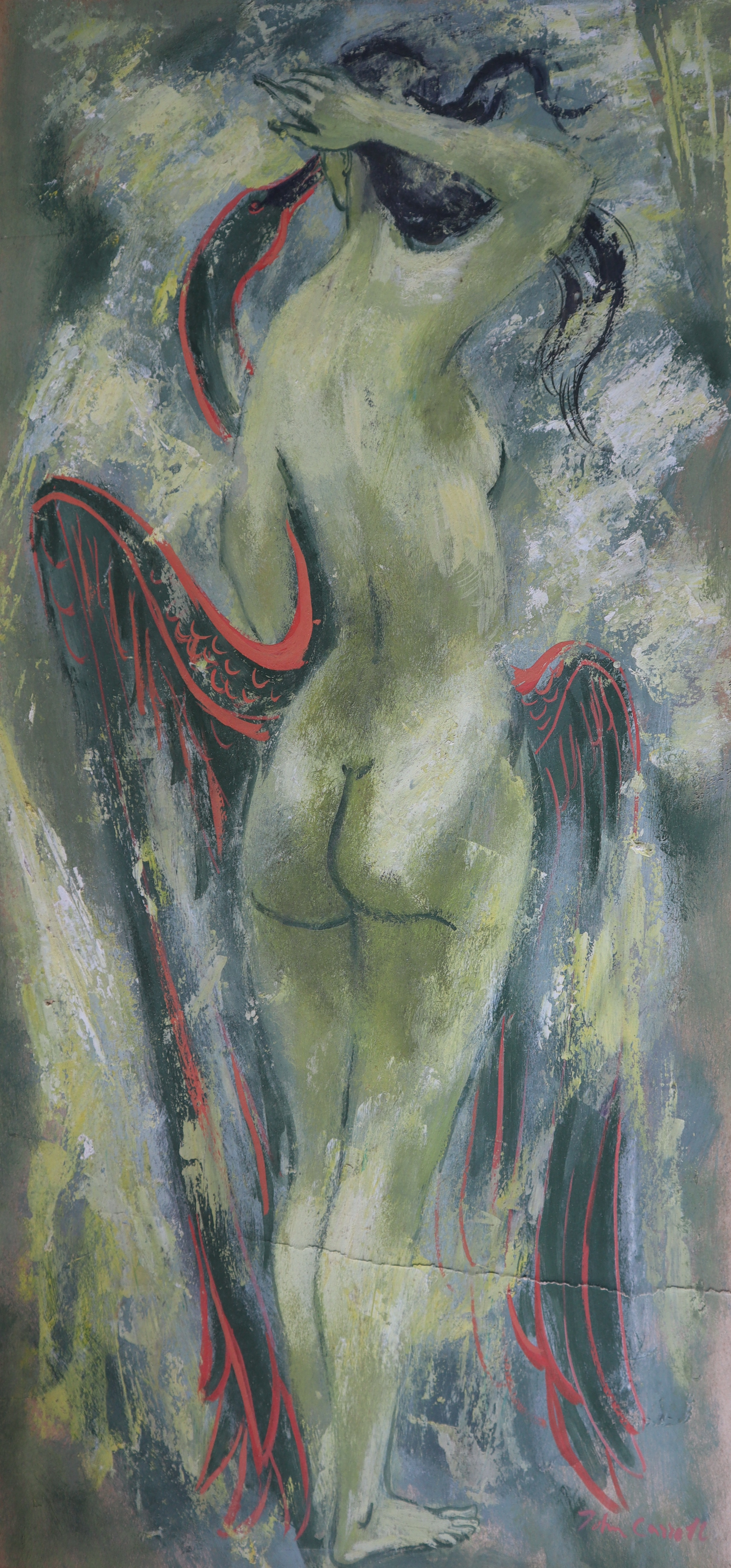
Carroll, John Wesley (c. 1940) Leda and the Swan [Mixed media on board]
