= Polar Shift (novel) =

2005 novel by Clive Cussler and Paul Kemprecos

- First edition (US)
- Author: Clive Cussler, with Paul Kemprecos
- Language: English
- Series: NUMA Files
- Genre: Thriller novel
- Publisher: Putnam (US); Michael Joseph (UK)
- Publication date: 2005
- Publication place: United States
- Media type: Print
- Preceded by: Lost City
- Followed by: The Navigator

Polar Shift is the sixth book in the NUMA Files series of books co-written by best-selling author Clive Cussler and Paul Kemprecos, and was published in 2005. The main character of this series is Kurt Austin.

In this novel geological polar shift is connected with magnetic polar shift, based on the supposed theories of Laszlo Kovacs, a student of real life Nikola Tesla.
