= Oregon Files =

Book series by Clive Cussler

The Oregon Files is a series of novels written by author Clive Cussler and several co-authors. Craig Dirgo was a co-writer for the first two titles, Jack Du Brul was a co-writer for the next seven titles, Boyd Morrison took over as co-writer starting with book 10, and Mike Maden wrote the 16th, 17th, 18th, and 19th book after Clive's passing.

The books follow the mysterious "Corporation" and its leader Juan Cabrillo. The title of the series, "Oregon Files", comes from the name of the corporation's ship, the Oregon.

== Books ==
The crew of the Oregon first appeared in Flood Tide. The main Oregon Files series consists of:

- Golden Buddha (2003)
- Sacred Stone (2004)
- Dark Watch (2005)
- Skeleton Coast (2006)
- Plague Ship (2008)
- Corsair (2009)
- The Silent Sea (2010)
- The Jungle (2011)
- Mirage (2013)
- Piranha (2015)
- The Emperor's Revenge (2016)
- Typhoon Fury (2017)
- Shadow Tyrants (2018)
- Final Option (2019)
- Marauder (2020)
- Clive Cussler's Hellburner (2022)
- Clive Cussler Fire Strike (2023)
- Clive Cussler Ghost Soldier (2024)
- Clive Cussler Quantum Tempest (2025)
- Clive Cussler Red Horizon (2027)

== Overview ==
The Oregon is a high tech ship owned by a private secret service organization called 'the Corporation'. It is disguised as a rusty old tramp steamer. It mounts five cranes - three fore, two aft – only two of which are operational, one each fore and aft. To add to its appearance of authenticity, this disguise is highly detailed. This includes a fake mess hall, and a captain's cabin specially designed to be utterly repulsive, with features including specially designed chemicals to keep people away, a dysfunctional toilet, and depressing paintings of clowns on black velvet.

Beneath the disguise the Oregon is an extraordinarily sophisticated intelligence-gathering vessel with luxury facilities and top-of-the-line technical capabilities. It is equipped with a moon pool for launching two minisubs, an Olympic swimming pool (in one of its ballast tanks), state-of-the-art medical facilities, and powered by a pair of revolutionary magnetohydrodynamic drives. It uses an array of underwater vectored-thrusters to give it unparalleled maneuverability for a ship of its size. The novel Dark Watch gives its dimensions as 560 feet long, with a 75-foot beam and a gross weight of 11,585 tons.

The Oregon is equipped with a suite of armaments that rivals most military capital ships, including: French-built Exocet anti-ship missiles, two torpedo tubes below the waterline (firing Russian-made TEST-71 and later Type 53-65 torpedoes, though Cabrillo has stated he would have preferred American Mk48 ADCAP), 20 mm multibarrel Gatling-style rotary cannons (probably M61 Vulcans) mounted behind steel plates on its hull, and an array of 7.62 mm caliber M60 machine guns concealed in dummy oil barrels welded onto her deck (also known as their boarder repellents) that are all remotely operated with the most sophisticated fire-control systems. As well as these, the Oregon carries Russian-built cruise missiles of an unspecified type, a 40 mm Bofors autocannon (later replaced by a Metal Storm gun system), and at least one Rheinmetall 120 mm gun of a similar type to that of the M1A1 Abrams tank. Most novels talk about the 120 mm in the singular, Dark Watch states that it has two – one on each side of the hull.

The ship's control center, located deep within its hull, is said to have the feel of the starship Enterprise, including a large, central command chair in which Cabrillo sits when on the bridge, which is colloquially referred to as "The Kirk Chair".

== Characters ==
=== Corporation members ===
==== Executive officers ====
- Juan Cabrillo: Chairman of The corporation. Formerly a CIA operative under Langston Overholt IV.
- Max Hanley: President of The Corporation/chief engineer. Formerly in the US Navy.
- Linda Ross: Vice President of The Corporation replacing Richard Truitt, previously Security and Surveillance Specialist. Formerly an intelligence officer aboard a US Navy Aegis Guided Missile Cruiser.

==== Current crew members ====
(In alphabetical order)

- George "Gomez" Adams: Helicopter pilot. Former US Army 160th SOAR.
- Rick Barrett: Assistant chef.
- Monica Crabtree: Supply and logistics coordinator.
- Chuck "Tiny" Gunderson: Chief pilot, fixed wing.
- Michael Halpert: Finance and accounting.
- Cliff Hornsby: General operations.
- Julia Huxley: Medical officer. Formerly the senior medical officer at the US Naval base in San Diego.
- Pete Jones: General operations.
- Hali Kasim: Communications/general operations.
- Larry King: Sniper/general operations. Former US Army 1st SFOD Delta.
- Franklin "Linc" Lincoln: Head of general operations. Formerly a US Navy SEAL.
- Marion "MacD" MacDougall Lawless III: General operations replacing Jerry Pulaski.
- Raven Malloy: Shore operations. First appears in book 12, Typhoon Fury.
- Judy Michaels: Pilot.
- Mark Murphy: Shipboard weapons and technology specialist/general operations.
- Kevin Nixon: Magic shop specialist.
- Jim O'Neill: General operations.
- Tracy Pilson: Pilot, amphibious plane.
- Sam Pryor: Propulsion engineer.
- Gunther Reinholt: Propulsion engineer.
- Eddie Seng: Director of shore operations/security and surveillance specialist replacing Linda Ross. Formerly a US Marine then CIA operative.
- Eric Stone: Control room operator/general operations/chief helmsman.
- Russ Kefauver: Intelligence Analyst and former CIA forensic accountant.
- Dr. Eric Littleton: Oregon's biophysical lab director.
- Mike Lavin: Chief armorer and retired U.S. Army armament/fire control maintenance supervisor
- Bill McDonald: Senior armorer and former CIA paramilitary operator.
- Amy Forrester: Physician's assistant and former Navy combat medic.
- Maurice: Chief steward. Formerly of the Royal Navy.

==== Retired crew members ====
(In alphabetical order)

- Carl Gannon: General operations.
- Bob Meadows: General operations.
- Richard Truitt: Vice president of The corporation.

==== Deceased crew members ====
- Jerry Pulaski: General operations.
- Mike Trono: General operations/helicopter pilot in training. Former US Air Force Pararescue.
- Tom Reyes: General operations

=== Others ===
- Langston Overholt IV: CIA officer who funnels jobs to the corporation and provides covert information
- Fiona Katamora: United States Secretary of State
- St. Julien Perlmutter: Scholar with expertise on the marine history on nearly three hundred thousand ships and shipwrecks
- Dirk Pitt: Friend of Juan Cabrillo and head of NUMA
